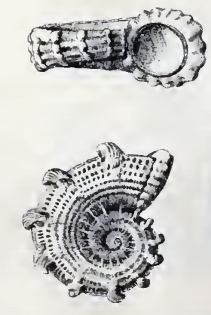
- Two views of a shell of Cyclostrema amabile

Scientific classification
- Kingdom: Animalia
- Phylum: Mollusca
- Class: Gastropoda
- Subclass: Vetigastropoda
- Order: Trochida
- Superfamily: Trochoidea
- Family: Liotiidae
- Genus: Cyclostrema; Marryat, 1818

Type species
- Cyclostrema cancellatum Marryat, 1818

Species
- See text

Synonyms
- Delphinoidea, Brown. 1727

= Cyclostrema =

Genus of gastropods

Cyclostrema is a genus of sea snails, marine gastropod mollusks in the family Liotiidae.

Cyclostrema is a neuter word, but many authors have considered it feminine, including Captain Marryat himself.

A complete revision of the family Liotiidae is under way (2013). Many species, now included in Cyclostrema, will eventually end up outside the family Liotiidae. (pers. comm.)

== Description ==
The characteristics of this genus are: The depressed shell is white, or uniformly colored. The body whorl is obliquely striate. The spire short. The aperture is circular. The umbilicus is very large with the volutions of the whorls visible within it. The surface contains spiral ridges and is cancellated.

== Species ==
Species within the genus Cyclostrema include:

- Cyclostrema alveolatum Jousseaume, 1872 (taxon inquirendum)
- Cyclostrema amabile (Dall, 1889)
- Cyclostrema annuliferum Dautzenberg, 1910
- Cyclostrema archeri Tryon, 1888
- Cyclostrema bibi Espinosa, Ortea, Fernandez-Garcés & Moro, 2007
- Cyclostrema bushi Dautzenberg & H. Fisher, 1906
- Cyclostrema cancellatum Marryat, 1818
- Cyclostrema carinatum H. Adams, 1873
- Cyclostrema charmophron Melvill, 1906
- Cyclostrema cingulatum Philippi, 1853
- Cyclostrema crassiolatum Strebel, 1908
- Cyclostrema densilaminata Verco, 1907
- Cyclostrema dollfusi Dautzenberg & H. Fischer, 1896
- Cyclostrema dunkeri Tryon, 1888
- Cyclostrema eumares Melvill, 1904
- Cyclostrema eupoietum Melvill, 1904
- Cyclostrema exiguum Philippi, 1849
- Cyclostrema gyalum Melvill, 1904
- Cyclostrema huesonicum (Dall, 1927)
- Cyclostrema lacteum Jousseaume, 1872 (status: uncertain - unassessed)
- Cyclostrema marchei Jousseaume, 1872
- Cyclostrema ocrinium Melvill & Standen, 1901
- Cyclostrema pentegoniostoma Carpenter, 1856: (taxon inquirendum)
- Cyclostrema philippii Issel, 1869 (taxon inquirendum)
- Cyclostrema placens (Melvill & Standen, 1901)
- Cyclostrema pompholyx (Dall, 1889)
- Cyclostrema prominulum Melvill & Standen, 1903
- Cyclostrema quadricarinatum Melvill & Standen, 1901
- Cyclostrema quinquecarinatum Melvill, 1906
- Cyclostrema quinquestriatum Melvill, 1912
- Cyclostrema smithi Dautzenberg & Fischer, 1897
- Cyclostrema solariellum Melvill, 1893
- Cyclostrema spiculigerum Melvill, 1912
- Cyclostrema spirula A. Adams, 1850
- Cyclostrema subexcavatum Tryon, 1888
- Cyclostrema supremum Melvill & Standen, 1903
- Cyclostrema sykesi Dautzenberg & H. Fischer, 1897
- Cyclostrema tortuganum (Dall, 1927)
- Cyclostrema virginiae Jousseaume, 1872

The following species are also mentioned in OBIS (the Indo-Pacific Molluscan Database):

- Cyclostrema japonicum Sakurai & Habe, 1977
- Cyclostrema novemcarinatum (Melvill, 1906)
- Cyclostrema reeveana (Hinds) A. Adams, 1850
- Cyclostrema spinosa Tenison-Woods, 1877
- Cyclostrema tornata A. Adams in Sowerby, 1863
- Cyclostrema torridum Hedley, 1909

Species brought into synonymy

- Cyclostrema affine A. E. Verrill, 1884: synonym of Skenea proxima (Tryon, 1888)
- Cyclostrema ammonoceras A. Adams, 1863: synonym of Munditiella ammonoceras (A. Adams, 1863)
- Cyclostrema angulatum auct. non A. Adams, 1850: synonym of Cyclostremiscus beauii (P. Fischer, 1857)
- Cyclostrema annellarium Melvill & Standen, 1903: synonym of Cyclostrema archeri Tryon, 1888
- Cyclostrema areolatum Sars, 1878: synonym of Skenea areolata (Sars, 1878)
- Cyclostrema baldridgei Bartsch, 1911: synonym of Cyclostremiscus baldridgae (Bartsch, 1911)
- Cyclostrema bartschi Mansfield, 1936: synonym of Cyclostremiscus veleronis (A. M. Strong & Hertlein, 1947)
- Cyclostrema basistriatum Jeffreys, 1877: synonym of Skenea basistriata (Jeffreys, 1877)
- Cyclostrema bastowi Gatliff, 1906: synonym of Orbitestella bastowi (Gatliff, 1906)
- Cyclostrema bicarinatum Guppy, 1866 †: synonym of Cyclostremiscus beauii (P. Fischer, 1857)
- Cyclostrema biporcata A. Adams, 1863: synonym of Pygmaerota biporcata (A. Adams, 1863)
- Cyclostrema calypso Melvill & Standen, 1912: synonym of Brookula calypso (Melvill & Standen, 1912)
- Cyclostrema cingulatum Verrill, 1884: synonym of Rugulina verrilli (Tryon, 1888)
- Cyclostrema cingulatum Dunker, 1859: synonym of Cyclostrema dunkeri Tryon, 1888
- Cyclostrema cinguliferum A. Adams, 1850: synonym of Circulus cingulifera (A. Adams, 1850)
- Cyclostrema cistronium Dall, 1889: synonym of Aorotrema cistronium (Dall, 1889)
- Cyclostrema coatsianum Melvill & Standen, 1912: synonym of Lodderia coatsiana (Melvill & Standen, 1912)
- Cyclostrema conicum Watson, 1886: synonym of Brookula conica (Watson, 1886)
- Cyclostrema cookeanum (Dall, 1918): synonym of Macrarene cookeana (Dall, 1918)
- Cyclostrema costulata Möller, 1842: synonym of Moelleria costulata (Möller, 1842)
- Cyclostrema crassicostatum Strebel, 1908: synonym of Liotella crassicostata (Strebel, 1908)
- Cyclostrema cubanus Pilsbry & Aguayo, 1933: synonym of Cyclostremiscus cubanus (Pilsbry & Aguayo, 1933)
- Cyclostrema cubitale Hedley, C. 1907: synonym of Cirsonella cubitale (Hedley, 1907)
- Cyclostrema dalli A. E. Verrill, 1882: synonym of Lissospira dalli (A. E. Verrill, 1882)
- Cyclostrema decussatum Pelseneer, 1903: synonym of Brookula decussata (Pelseneer, 1903)
- Cyclostrema diaphanum A. E. Verrill, 1884: synonym of Skenea diaphana (A. E. Verrill, 1884)
- Cyclostrema elegans A. Adams, 1850: synonym of Adeorbis elegans (A. Adams, 1850)
- Cyclostrema euchilopteron Melvill & Standen, 1903: synonym of Lydiphnis euchilopteron (Melvill & Standen, 1903)
- Cyclostrema fluctuatum Hedley, 1899: synonym of Argalista fluctuata (Hutton, 1883)
- Cyclostrema fulgidum auct. non Jeffreys, 1883: synonym of Lissospira dalli (A. E. Verrill, 1882)
- Cyclostrema funnazzense de Gregorio, 1889: synonym of Cirsonella romettensis (Granata-Grillo, 1877)
- Cyclostrema fuscopiperata Turton, 1932: synonym of Peasiella fuscopiperata (Turton, 1932)
- Cyclostrema gaudens Melvill & Standen, 1912: synonym of Munditia gaudens (Melvill & Standen, 1912)
- Cyclostrema granulatum A. Adams, 1853: synonym of Cinysca granulata (A. Adams, 1853)
- Cyclostrema granulum Dall, 1889: synonym of Parviturbo granulum (Dall, 1889)
- Cyclostrema gravieri Lamy, 1909: synonym of Ethminolia gravieri (Lamy, 1909)
- Cyclostrema henjamense Melvill & Standen, 1903: synonym of Pseudoliotia henjamensis (Melvill & Standen, 1903)
- Cyclostrema humile Pelseneer, 1903: synonym of Lissotesta humilis (Pelseneer, 1903)
- Cyclostrema iheringi Dautzenberg & H. Fischer, 1897: synonym of Retigyra iheringi (Dautzenberg & H. Fischer, 1897)
- Cyclostrema immaculata Tenison-Woods, 1877: synonym of Munditia subquadrata (Tenison-Woods, 1878)
- Cyclostrema jaffaensis Verco, 1909: synonym of Eudaronia jaffaensis (Verco, 1909)
- Cyclostrema laevigatum Friele, 1874: synonym of Skenea trochoides (Friele, 1874)
- Cyclostrema laeve (Kiener, 1838): synonym of Pygmaeorota laevis (Kiener, 1838)
- Cyclostrema laevis [sic] : synonym of Pygmaeorota laevis (Kiener, 1838)
- Cyclostrema limatum Dall, 1889: synonym of Granigyra limata (Dall, 1889)
- Cyclostrema liratulum Pelseneer, 1903: synonym of Lissotesta liratula (Pelseneer, 1903)
- Cyclostrema meridionale Melvill & Standen, 1912: synonym of Munditia meridionalis (Melvill & Standen, 1912)
- Cyclostrema messanensis Seguenza, 1876: synonym of Moelleriopsis messanensis (Seguenza, 1876)
- Cyclostrema micans A. Adams, 1850: synonym of Pseudoliotia micans (A. Adams, 1850)
- Cyclostrema micra Tenison-Woods, 1876: synonym of Lissotesta micra (Tenison-Woods, 1876)
- Cyclostrema militare Jousseaume, 1872: synonym of Cochliolepis militaris (Jousseaume, 1872)
- Cyclostrema millipunctatum Friele, 1886: synonym of Retigyra millipunctata (Friele, 1886)
- Cyclostrema minutum Jeffreys, 1883: synonym of Firoloida desmarestia Lesueur, 1817
- Cyclostrema monterosatoi Ancey, 1898: synonym of Skenea catenoides (Monterosato, 1877)
- Cyclostrema nivea [sic] : synonym of Tubiola nivea (Gmelin, 1791)
- Cyclostrema normani Dautzenberg & H. Fischer, 1897: synonym of Moelleriopsis normani (Dautzenberg & H. Fischer, 1897)
- Cyclostrema ocrinium Melvill & Standen, 1901: misspelling of Cyclostrema ocrinum Melvill & Standen, 1901
- Cyclostrema ornatum A. E. Verrill, 1884: synonym of Lissospira ornata (A. E. Verrill, 1884)
- Cyclostrema pentagonum Gabb, 1873: synonym of Cyclostremiscus pentagonus (Gabb, 1873)
- Cyclostrema peterseni Friele, 1877: synonym of Skenea peterseni (Friele, 1877)
- Cyclostrema plana A. Adams, 1850: synonym of Sigaretornus planus (A. Adams, 1850)
- Cyclostrema planorbis Dall, 1927: synonym of Palazzia planorbis (Dall, 1927)
- Cyclostrema planulata G. B. Sowerby III, 1892: synonym of Cochliolepis planulata (G.B. Sowerby III, 1892) (original combination)
- Cyclostrema ponsonbyi Dautzenberg & H. Fischer, 1897: synonym of Skenea ponsonbyi (Dautzenberg & H. Fischer, 1897)
- Cyclostrema pontogenes Schwengel & McGinty, 1942: synonym of Aorotrema pontogenes (Schwengel & McGinty, 1942)
- Cyclostrema proximum Tryon, 1888: synonym of Skenea proxima (Tryon, 1888)
- Cyclostrema richardi Dautzenberg & H. Fischer, 1896: synonym of Moelleriopsis richardi (Dautzenberg & H. Fischer, 1896)
- Cyclostrema rotundata G.B. Sowerby III, 1892: synonym of Homalopoma rotundatum (G.B. Sowerby III, 1892)
- Cyclostrema rugulosa Sars, 1878: synonym of Skenea rugulosa (Sars, 1878)
- Cyclostrema sanibelense Pilsbry, 1939: synonym of Parviturboides interruptus (C. B. Adams, 1850)
- Cyclostrema schrammii P. Fischer, 1857: synonym of Tornus schrammii (P. Fischer, 1857)
- Cyclostrema sculptile Garrett, 1874: synonym of Circulus marchei Jousseaume, 1872
- Cyclostrema semisculptum Martens, 1904: synonym of Spectamen semisculptum (Martens, 1904)
- Cyclostrema subdisjuncta H. Adams, 1868: synonym of Fossarella subdisjuncta (H. Adams, 1868)
- Cyclostrema sulcatum Watson, 1886: synonym of Moelleriopsis watsoni (Tryon, 1888)
- Cyclostrema susonis Tenison-Woods, 1877: synonym of Cirsonella weldii (Tenison-Woods, 1877)
- Cyclostrema thomasi Pilsbry, 1945: synonym of Vitrinella solaris Rubio, Fernández-Garcés & Rolán, 2011
- Cyclostrema tricarinata E.A. Smith, 1871: synonym of Circulus smithi Bush, 1897
- Cyclostrema trochoides auct. non Friele, 1876: synonym of Lissospira dalli (A. E. Verrill, 1882)
- Cyclostrema trochoides Friele, 1874: synonym of Skenea trochoides (Friele, 1874)
- Cyclostrema turbinum Dall, 1889: synonym of Haplocochlias turbinus (Dall, 1889)
- Cyclostrema turgidum Odhner, 1912: synonym of Lissospira turgida (Odhner, 1912)
- Cyclostrema valvatoides Jeffreys, 1883: synonym of Moelleriopsis valvatoides (Jeffreys, 1883)
- Cyclostrema verrilli Tryon, 1888: synonym of Rugulina verrilli (Tryon, 1888)
- Cyclostrema watsoni Tryon, 1888: synonym of Moelleriopsis watsoni (Tryon, 1888)
- Cyclostrema weldii Tenison-Woods, 1877: synonym of Cirsonella weldii (Tenison-Woods, 1877)
- Cyclostrema willei Friele, 1886: synonym of Skenea basistriata (Jeffreys, 1877)
- Cyclostrema zacalles Mazÿck, 1913: synonym of Parviturboides interruptus (C. B. Adams, 1850)
- Cyclostrema (Tubiola) cornuella (A. Adams, 1860): synonym of Tubiola cornuella (A. Adams, 1860)
- Cyclostrema (Tubiola) nivea [sic] : synonym of Tubiola nivea (Gmelin, 1791)
