= Austroliotia densilineata =

Scientific classification
- Kingdom: Animalia
- Phylum: Mollusca
- Class: Gastropoda
- Subclass: Vetigastropoda
- Order: Trochida
- Family: Liotiidae
- Genus: Austroliotia
- Species: A. densilineata

Binomial name
- Austroliotia densilineata (Tate, 1899)

Synonyms
- Liotia densilineata Tate, R. 1899 (original combination)

Species of gastropod

Austroliotia densilineata, common name the close-lined austroliotia, is a species of sea snail, a marine gastropod mollusk in the family Liotiidae. This species is endemic to Australia.

== Description ==
The height of the shell attains 4.5 mm, its diameter 7 mm.

(Original description) This species has the general appearance of an immature Austroliotia australis. The revolving lirae are almost obsolete, being entirely absent from the base. The transverse threadlets are depressed, very numerous, and closely crowded, so that they completely obliterate the cancellate ornamentation. The axial threadlets are fasciculated at both sutures, giving rise to a corona on the anterior whorls and to subspinose developments on the earlier ones. The umbilicus is large, and its margin is coronated by the fasciculation of the transverse threadlets.

The aperture is circular, with a slightly dilated but non-varicose outer margin, suggesting that the shell has probably not yet reached maturity. The columellar margin is detached from the umbilical rim. The operculum is of the type characteristic of Austroliotia.

== Distribution ==
The genus Austroliotia belongs to the family Liotiidae, which is known for its diverse range of land snails, distributed primarily across Australia. This marine species occurs off Victoria, South Australia, Western Australia, and Tasmania.
