= Sarcina (disambiguation) =

Sarcina is a pack carried by Roman legionnaires.

Sarcina may also refer to:

- Sarcina, a genus of Gram-positive bacteria
- Dentarene sarcina, a species of sea snail, also referred as the spiny wheel shell
- Leotropa sarcina, a species of snout moth
- Antonia Sarcina (born 1963), Italian pianist and composer
- Francesco Sarcina, an Italian rock singer
