= Pseudoliotina =

- Drawing of a shell of Pseudoliotina discoidea

Scientific classification
- Kingdom: Animalia
- Phylum: Mollusca
- Class: Gastropoda
- Subclass: Vetigastropoda
- Order: Trochida
- Superfamily: Trochoidea
- Family: Skeneidae
- Genus: Pseudoliotina; Cossmann, 1925

Type species
- † Liotia sensuyi Vidal, 1921

Genus of gastropods

Pseudoliotina is a genus of small sea snails, marine gastropod mollusks in the family Skeneidae.

== Species ==
Species within the genus Pseudoliotina include:

- †Pseudoliotina mcleani Sohl, 1998: fossil species from the Maastrichtian in Puerto Rico, Cretaceous
- †Pseudoliotina sensuyi (Vidal, 1921)
- †Pseudoliotina stinnesbecki Kiel & Bandel, 2002

Synonyms

- Pseudoliotina discoidea (Reeve, 1843): synonym of Rotaliotina discoidea (Reeve, 1843) (superseded combination)
- Pseudoliotina springsteeni McLean, 1988: synonym of Rotaliotina springsteeni (McLean, 1988) superseded combination)
