= Rufanula sextula =

Scientific classification
- Kingdom: Animalia
- Phylum: Mollusca
- Class: Gastropoda
- Subclass: Vetigastropoda
- Order: Trochida
- Superfamily: Trochoidea
- Family: Liotiidae
- Subfamily: Liotiinae
- Genus: Rufanula
- Species: R. sextula

Binomial name
- Rufanula sextula Barnard, 1963

Species of gastropod

Rufanula sextula is a species of sea snail, a marine gastropod mollusk, in the family Liotiidae.

== Distribution ==
The species occurs in South Africa.
