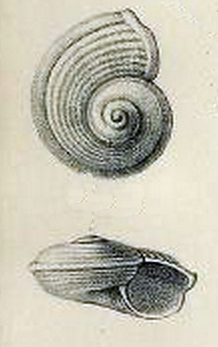
- Original drawing with two views of a shell of Cyclostrema prominulum

Scientific classification
- Kingdom: Animalia
- Phylum: Mollusca
- Class: Gastropoda
- Subclass: Vetigastropoda
- Order: Trochida
- Superfamily: Trochoidea
- Family: Liotiidae
- Genus: Cyclostrema
- Species: C. prominulum

Binomial name
- Cyclostrema prominulum Melvill & Standen, 1903

= Cyclostrema prominulum =

Species of gastropod

Cyclostrema prominulum is a species of sea snail, a marine gastropod mollusk in the family Liotiidae.

== Description ==
The height of the shell attains 1 mm and its diameter 2 mm. It is a very minute, deeply umbilicate, white shell with a depressed discoidal shape. The shell contains four whorls. The two apical whorls are very small. The surface is uniformly multilirate. The lirae at the periphery are metamorphosed into a strong, very prominent and acute keel. The aperture is round. The outer lip is thin.

== Distribution ==
This species occurs in the Gulf of Oman.
