= Rhodinoliotia roseotincta =

Scientific classification
- Kingdom: Animalia
- Phylum: Mollusca
- Class: Gastropoda
- Subclass: Vetigastropoda
- Order: Trochida
- Superfamily: Trochoidea
- Family: Liotiidae
- Subfamily: Liotiinae
- Genus: Rhodinoliotia
- Species: R. roseotincta

Binomial name
- Rhodinoliotia roseotincta (E. A. Smith, 1872)

Synonyms
- Cyclostrema roseotincta E. A. Smith, 1872

Species of gastropod

Rhodinoliotia roseotincta is a species of sea snail, a marine gastropod mollusk, in the family Liotiidae.
