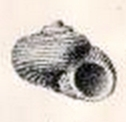
- Original drawing of a shell of Cyclostrema eupoietum

Scientific classification
- Kingdom: Animalia
- Phylum: Mollusca
- Class: Gastropoda
- Subclass: Vetigastropoda
- Order: Trochida
- Superfamily: Trochoidea
- Family: Liotiidae
- Genus: Cyclostrema
- Species: C. eupoietum

Binomial name
- Cyclostrema eupoietum Melvill, 1904

Synonyms
- Cyclostrema eupoletum Melvill, 1904 (misspelling)

= Cyclostrema eupoietum =

Species of gastropod

Cyclostrema eupoietum is a species of sea snail, a marine gastropod mollusk in the family Liotiidae.

== Description ==
(Original description by Melvill) The height of the shell attains 1.5 mm and its diameter 2 mm. This is a small, narrowly umbilicated shell with four whorls. The last two whorls are very closely spirally lirately furrowed. The penultimate whorls is puncto-striate. The crenelations round the half-covered umbilicus are large in proportion to the size of the shell. The aperture is round. The peristome is continuous, hardly thickened, a tongue-shaped process, lirato-sulcate as is the rest of the surface, extending over the umbilical region.

== Distribution ==
This species occurs in the Persian Gulf.
