= Cyclostrema tortuganum =

Scientific classification
- Kingdom: Animalia
- Phylum: Mollusca
- Class: Gastropoda
- Subclass: Vetigastropoda
- Order: Trochida
- Family: Liotiidae
- Genus: Cyclostrema
- Species: C. tortuganum

Binomial name
- Cyclostrema tortuganum (Dall, 1927)

Synonyms
- Liotia (Lippistes) tortugana Dall, 1927

Species of gastropod

Cyclostrema tortuganum, common name the Tortugas cyclostreme, is a species of sea snail, a marine gastropod mollusc in the family Liotiidae.

== Description ==
The size of the shell varies between 4 mm and 10 mm.

== Distribution ==
This species occurs off in the Gulf of Mexico (East Florida, Cuba), the West Indies (the Dry Tortugas, Virgin Islands: St. Croix), the Caribbean Sea (Colombia, Venezuela) and the Atlantic Ocean (Bahamas, Brazil).
