= Pterarene sakashitai =

Scientific classification
- Kingdom: Animalia
- Phylum: Mollusca
- Class: Gastropoda
- Subclass: Vetigastropoda
- Order: Trochida
- Superfamily: Trochoidea
- Family: Liotiidae
- Genus: Pterarene
- Species: P. sakashitai

Binomial name
- Pterarene sakashitai Sakurai & Habe, 1977

Species of gastropod

Pterarene sakashitai is a species of small sea snail, a marine gastropod mollusk, in the family Liotiidae.
