= Austroliotia scalaris =

Scientific classification
- Kingdom: Animalia
- Phylum: Mollusca
- Class: Gastropoda
- Subclass: Vetigastropoda
- Order: Trochida
- Family: Liotiidae
- Genus: Austroliotia
- Species: A. scalaris

Binomial name
- Austroliotia scalaris (Hedley, 1903)

Synonyms
- Austroliotia saxa (Laseron, 1954); Liotia tasmanica scalaris Hedley, C. 1903

Species of gastropod

Austroliotia scalaris, is a species of sea snail, a marine gastropod mollusk in the family Liotiidae. Liotiids are commonly known as wheel shells.

== Description ==
The size of the shell varies between 5 mm and 8 mm and the height of the shell is equal to its width.

== Distribution ==
This marine species is endemic to Australia. It occurs off Queensland and New South Wales, from Fraser Island in Queensland, to Brush Island in southern New South Wales.
