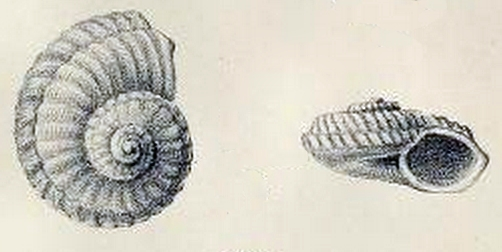
- Original image with two views of a shell of Cyclostrema supremum

Scientific classification
- Kingdom: Animalia
- Phylum: Mollusca
- Class: Gastropoda
- Subclass: Vetigastropoda
- Order: Trochida
- Superfamily: Trochoidea
- Family: Liotiidae
- Genus: Cyclostrema
- Species: C. supremum

Binomial name
- Cyclostrema supremum Melvill & Standen, 1903

= Cyclostrema supremum =

Species of gastropod

Cyclostrema supremum is a species of sea snail, a marine gastropod mollusk in the family Liotiidae.

== Description ==
The height of the shell attains 1.5 mm and its diameter 4 mm. The white shell has a plane-discoidal shape with 5 whorls. The species is beautifully cancellate and sculptured, though more or less smooth below the periphery and around the narrow but deep umbilicus. The whorls are all channeled at the sutures, very distinct (seen with a lens) on the two apical whorls. The penultimate whorl contains one keels and the body whorl three keels. The oblique aperture is oval.

== Distribution ==
This species occurs in the subtidal zone of the Persian Gulf
