= Cyclostrema placens =

Scientific classification
- Kingdom: Animalia
- Phylum: Mollusca
- Class: Gastropoda
- Subclass: Vetigastropoda
- Order: Trochida
- Superfamily: Trochoidea
- Family: Liotiidae
- Genus: Cyclostrema
- Species: C. placens

Binomial name
- Cyclostrema placens (Melvill & Standen, 1901)

Species of gastropod

Cyclostrema placens is a species of sea snail, a marine gastropod mollusk in the family Liotiidae.
