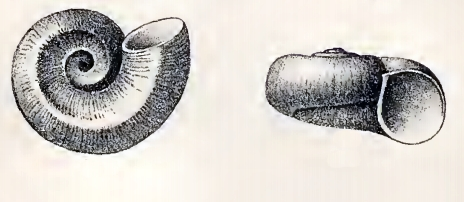
- Original drawing with two views of a shell of Cyclostrema subexcavatum

Scientific classification
- Kingdom: Animalia
- Phylum: Mollusca
- Class: Gastropoda
- Subclass: Vetigastropoda
- Order: Trochida
- Superfamily: Trochoidea
- Family: Liotiidae
- Genus: Cyclostrema
- Species: C. subexcavatum

Binomial name
- Cyclostrema subexcavatum Tryon, 1888

Synonyms
- Cyclostrema (Daronia) subexcavata Tryon, 1888 (original description); Cyclostrema excavata Watson, 1886 (preoccupied by Carpenter)

= Cyclostrema subexcavatum =

Species of gastropod

Cyclostrema subexcavatum is a species of sea snail, a marine gastropod mollusk in the family Liotiidae.

== Description ==
(Original description by G.W. Tryon) The height of the shell attains 2.2 mm. The umbilicus is wide, perspective and shallow. The shell is whitish under a yellowish brown, membraneous epidermis. The spire is scarcely raised. The 4 whorls increase rather slowly until the last, which is rather large. The suture is broadly, angularly impressed. A little below the suture there is a bluntly angulated spiral keel. And on the middle of the base, towards the oblique aperture there is another keel. The thin peristome is simple.

== Distribution ==
This marine species occurs off Puerto Rico at a depth of about 700 m.
