= Globarene cidaris =

Scientific classification
- Kingdom: Animalia
- Phylum: Mollusca
- Class: Gastropoda
- Subclass: Vetigastropoda
- Order: Trochida
- Superfamily: Trochoidea
- Family: Liotiidae
- Genus: Globarene
- Species: G. cidaris

Binomial name
- Globarene cidaris (Reeve, 1843)

Synonyms
- Delphinula cidaris Reeve, 1843; Liotia cidaris (Reeve, 1843); Liotina cidaris (Reeve, 1843)

Species of gastropod

Globarene cidaris is a species of sea snail, a marine gastropod mollusk, in the family Liotiidae.
