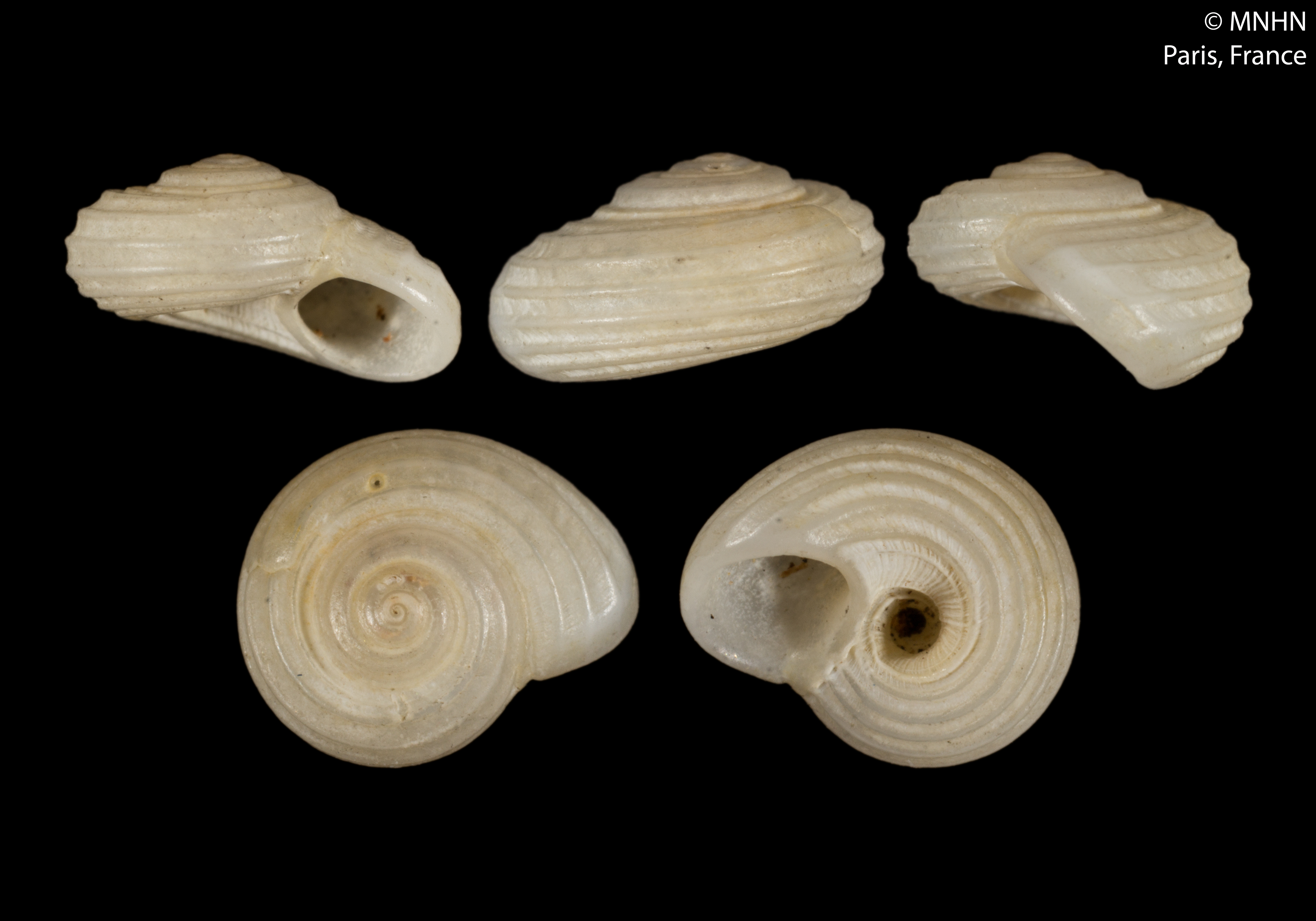
- Shell of Cyclostrema virginiae (syntype at MNHN, Paris)

Scientific classification
- Kingdom: Animalia
- Phylum: Mollusca
- Class: Gastropoda
- Subclass: Vetigastropoda
- Order: Trochida
- Family: Liotiidae
- Genus: Cyclostrema
- Species: C. virginiae

Binomial name
- Cyclostrema virginiae Jousseaume, 1872

Synonyms
- Lodderia virginiae (Jousseaume, 1872)

= Cyclostrema virginiae =

Species of gastropod

Cyclostrema virginiae is a species of sea snail, a marine gastropod mollusk in the family Liotiidae.

== Description ==
The height of the shell attains 6 mm.

== Distribution ==
This species occurs in the Indian Ocean off Madagascar and Réunion; in the Pacific Ocean off Japan.
