= Cyclostrema dunkeri =

- Original drawing with two views of a shell of Cyclostrema dunkeri

Scientific classification
- Kingdom: Animalia
- Phylum: Mollusca
- Class: Gastropoda
- Subclass: Vetigastropoda
- Order: Trochida
- Superfamily: Trochoidea
- Family: Liotiidae
- Genus: Cyclostrema
- Species: C. dunkeri

Binomial name
- Cyclostrema dunkeri Tryon, 1888

Synonyms
- Cyclostrema cingulatum Dunker, 1859 (invalid: secondary junior homonym of Cyclostrema cingulatum (Philippi, 1852); C. dunkeri is a replacement name)

Species of gastropod

Cyclostrema dunkeri is a species of small sea snail, a marine gastropod mollusk, in the family Liotiidae.

== Description ==
The diameter of the shell attains 2.5 mm. The depressed shell is widely umbilicated, with a spiral rib near the suture, another on the periphery, and a third circumscribing the umbilicus.

== Distribution ==
This marine species occurs off Japan.
