= Cyclostrema bibi =

Scientific classification
- Kingdom: Animalia
- Phylum: Mollusca
- Class: Gastropoda
- Subclass: Vetigastropoda
- Order: Trochida
- Family: Liotiidae
- Genus: Cyclostrema
- Species: C. bibi

Binomial name
- Cyclostrema bibi Espinosa, Ortea, Fernandez-Garcés & Moro, 2007

Species of gastropod

Cyclostrema bibi is a species of sea snail, a marine gastropod mollusk in the family Liotiidae.

== Description ==
The height of the shell attains 4.4 mm. Cyclostrema shells are usually white.

== Distribution ==
This species occurs in the Caribbean Sea off Cuba at depths between 30 m and 40 m.
