= Cyclostrema spinosa =

Scientific classification
- Kingdom: Animalia
- Phylum: Mollusca
- Class: Gastropoda
- Subclass: Vetigastropoda
- Order: Trochida
- Superfamily: Trochoidea
- Family: Liotiidae
- Genus: Cyclostrema
- Species: C. spinosa

Binomial name
- Cyclostrema spinosa Tenison Woods, 1877

Species of gastropod

Cyclostrema spinosa is a species of sea snail, a marine gastropod mollusk, in the family Liotiidae.
