= Cithna =

Scientific classification
- Kingdom: Animalia
- Phylum: Mollusca
- Class: Gastropoda
- Subclass: Vetigastropoda
- Order: Trochida
- Family: Liotiidae
- Genus: Cithna; A. Adams, 1863

Genus of gastropods

Cithna is a genus of sea snails, marine gastropod mollusks in the family Liotiidae.

== Species ==
Species within the genus Cithna include:

- Cithna globosa A. Adams, 1863
- Cithna margaritifera (R. B. Watson, 1880)
- † Cithna pilsbryi Richards 1947
- Cithna spirata A. Adams, 1863

Synonyms

- Cithna carinata Jeffreys, 1883 is a synonym of Haloceras carinata (Jeffreys, 1883)
- Cithna cingulata Verrill, 1884 is a synonym of Haloceras cingulata (Verrill, 1884)
- Cithna jeffreysi (Dautzenberg, 1889) is a synonym of Benthonella tenella (Jeffreys, 1869)
- Cithna marshalli Sykes, 1925 is a synonym of Iphitus marshalli (Sykes, 1925)
- Cithna naticiformis Jeffreys, 1883 is a synonym of Choristella nofronii McLean, 1992
- Cithna tenella (Jeffreys, 1869): synonym of Benthonella tenella (Jeffreys, 1869)
