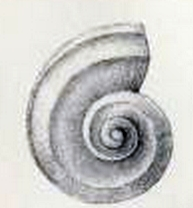
- Original drawing of a shell of Cyclostrema quadricarinatum

Scientific classification
- Kingdom: Animalia
- Phylum: Mollusca
- Class: Gastropoda
- Subclass: Vetigastropoda
- Order: Trochida
- Superfamily: Trochoidea
- Family: Liotiidae
- Genus: Cyclostrema
- Species: C. quadricarinatum

Binomial name
- Cyclostrema quadricarinatum Melvill & Standen, 1901

= Cyclostrema quadricarinatum =

Species of gastropod

Cyclostrema quadricarinatum is a species of sea snail, a marine gastropod mollusk in the family Liotiidae.

== Description ==
(Original description by Melvill & Standen) The height of the shell attains 1 mm and its diameter 2.25 mm. The solid, depressed shell is umbilicated. The shell is highly sculptured with a minute angle. It contains 3½ whorls with the upper whorl minute. The body whorl is larger in proportion, four-keeled and with acute carinae. With the aid of a lens the surface is seen to be longitudinally extremely shagreened or striate. The peristome is continuous, six-angled externally. The aperture is round. The operculum is present, horny and multispiral. The nearest ally, Circulus smithi Bush, 1897 (synonym: Cyclostrema trlcarinata Smith), from West Africa, we have compared with our species. There is some affinity, but, as its name implies, that species is but three-angled and is likewise radiately lirate.

== Distribution ==
This species occurs in the Gulf of Oman.
