= Pareuchelus dautzenbergi =

Scientific classification
- Kingdom: Animalia
- Phylum: Mollusca
- Class: Gastropoda
- Subclass: Vetigastropoda
- Order: Trochida
- Superfamily: Trochoidea
- Family: Liotiidae
- Genus: †Pareuchelus
- Species: †P. dautzenbergi

Binomial name
- †Pareuchelus dautzenbergi Landau, Van Dingenen & Ceulemans, 2017

Extinct species of gastropod

Pareuchelus dautzenbergi is an extinct species of sea snail, a marine gastropod mollusk, in the family Liotiidae.

== Distribution ==
This species occurs in France.
