= Cyclostrema archeri =

- Original drawing with two views of a shell of Cyclostrema archeri

Scientific classification
- Kingdom: Animalia
- Phylum: Mollusca
- Class: Gastropoda
- Subclass: Vetigastropoda
- Order: Trochida
- Superfamily: Trochoidea
- Family: Liotiidae
- Genus: Cyclostrema
- Species: C. archeri

Binomial name
- Cyclostrema archeri Tryon, 1888

Synonyms
- Cyclostrema annellarium Melvill & Standen, 1903

Species of gastropod

Cyclostrema archeri is a species of sea snail, a marine gastropod mollusk in the family Liotiidae.

== Description ==
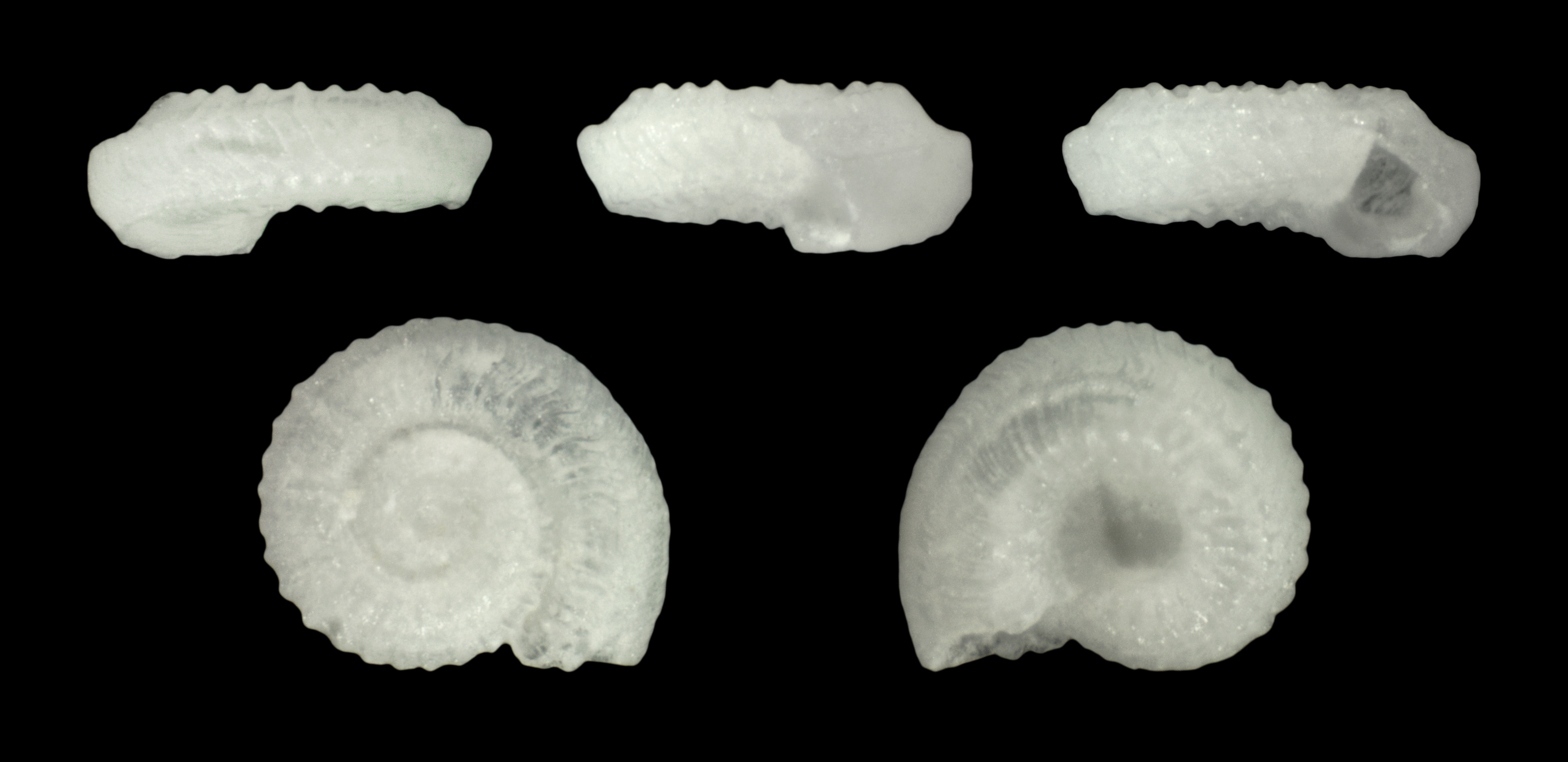

The height of the depressed shell attains 1.5 mm. The shell is rather widely umbilicated. The spire is scarcely elevated. The rounded whorls contain regular convex longitudinal ribs. The interstices are finely spirally lirate. The peristome is thickened.

== Distribution ==
This species occurs in the Indian Ocean off Réunion.
