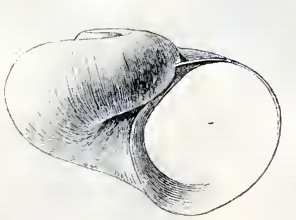
- Original drawing of a shell of Cyclostrema pompholyx

Scientific classification
- Kingdom: Animalia
- Phylum: Mollusca
- Class: Gastropoda
- Subclass: Vetigastropoda
- Order: Trochida
- Family: Liotiidae
- Genus: Cyclostrema
- Species: C. pompholyx

Binomial name
- Cyclostrema pompholyx (Dall, 1889)

Synonyms
- Choristes pompholyx (Dall, 1889); Choristella pompholyx (Dall, 1889)

= Cyclostrema pompholyx =

Species of gastropod

Cyclostrema pompholyx is a species of sea snail, a marine gastropod mollusc in the family Liotiidae.

== Description ==
(Original description by W.H. Dall) The maximum diameter of the base is 4.2 mm; the minimum diameter 3.0 mm. The height of the shell attains 3.0 mm. The white, thin and polished shell contains three rounded, rapidly enlarging whorls. The sculpture consists of incremental striae. The suture is deep but not channelled. The whorls are very round, but the spire is hardly rising above the body whorl. The base of the shell is rounded, with a very narrow umbilicus, into which the whorl descends without any angle or other change of curve. The large aperture is circular, the upper part a little angulated at the suture. The simple margin is sharp and somewhat expanded but hardly reflected.

== Distribution ==
This species occurs in the Gulf of Mexico.
