= Cyclostrema smithi =

Scientific classification
- Kingdom: Animalia
- Phylum: Mollusca
- Class: Gastropoda
- Subclass: Vetigastropoda
- Order: Trochida
- Superfamily: Trochoidea
- Family: Liotiidae
- Genus: Cyclostrema
- Species: C. smithi

Binomial name
- Cyclostrema smithi Dautzenberg & Fischer, 1897

Species of gastropod

Cyclostrema smithi is a species of sea snail, a marine gastropod mollusk in the family Liotiidae.

== Description ==
The height of the shell attains 2 mm.

== Distribution ==
This species occurs in the Atlantic Ocean off the Azores and New Jersey, US, at depths of 1,100 m.
