= Cithna margaritifera =

Scientific classification
- Kingdom: Animalia
- Phylum: Mollusca
- Class: Gastropoda
- Subclass: Vetigastropoda
- Order: Trochida
- Superfamily: Trochoidea
- Family: Liotiidae
- Genus: Cithna
- Species: C. margaritifera

Binomial name
- Cithna margaritifera (R. B. Watson, 1880)

Synonyms
- Lacuna margaritifera R. B. Watson, 1880

Species of gastropod

Cithna margaritifera is a species of sea snail, a marine gastropod mollusk, in the family Liotiidae.
