= Cyclostrema marchei =

Scientific classification
- Kingdom: Animalia
- Phylum: Mollusca
- Class: Gastropoda
- Subclass: Vetigastropoda
- Order: Trochida
- Superfamily: Trochoidea
- Family: Liotiidae
- Genus: Cyclostrema
- Species: C. marchei

Binomial name
- Cyclostrema marchei Jousseaume, 1872

Synonyms
- Cyclostrema sculptile Garrett, 1874

Species of gastropod

Cyclostrema marchei is a species of sea snail, a marine gastropod mollusk, in the family Liotiidae.
