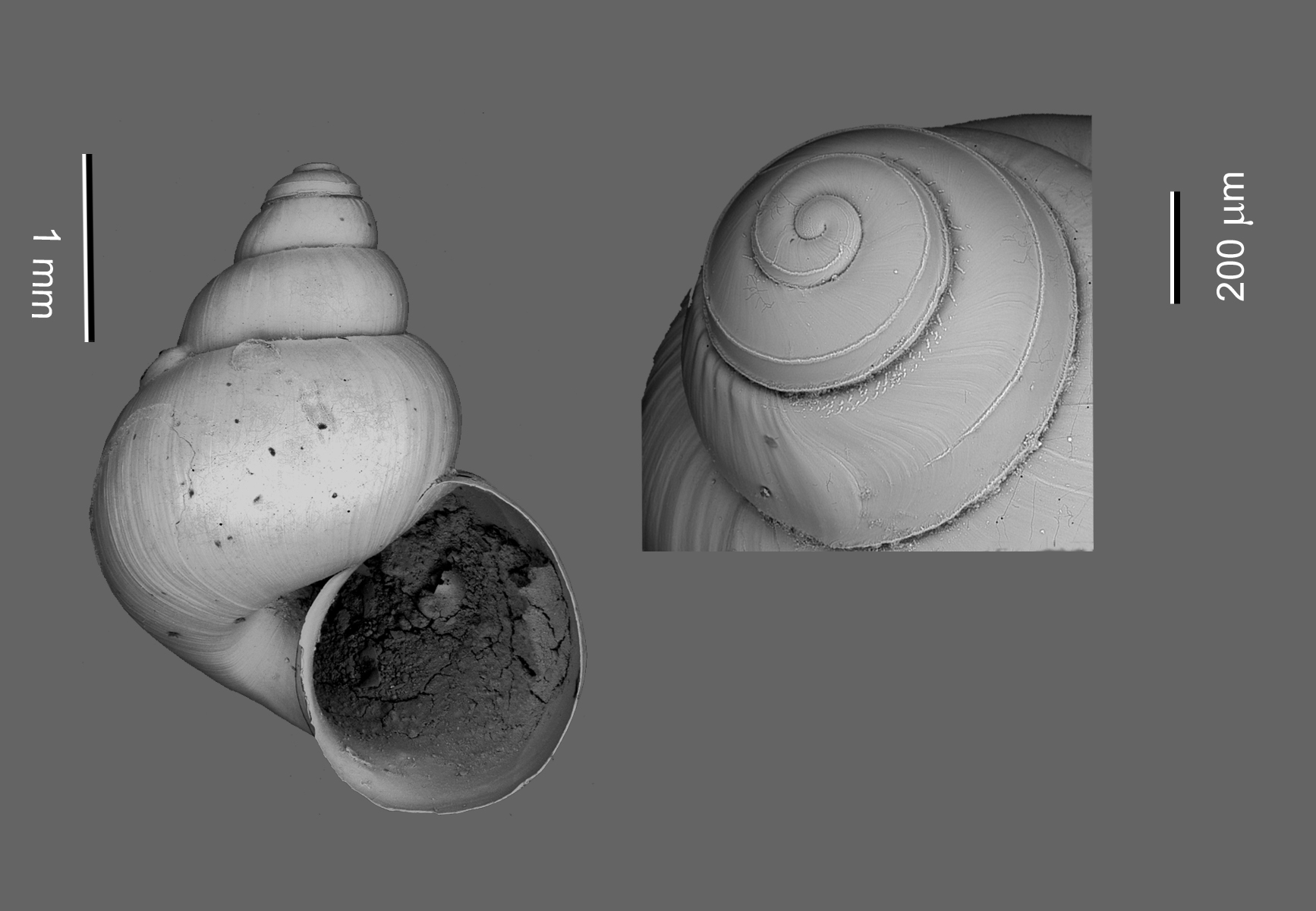
- Shell of Benthonella tenella (specimen at MNHN, Paris)

Scientific classification
- Kingdom: Animalia
- Phylum: Mollusca
- Class: Gastropoda
- Subclass: Caenogastropoda
- Order: Littorinimorpha
- Superfamily: Rissooidea
- Family: Rissoidae
- Genus: Benthonella; Dall, 1889

Type species
- Benthonella tenella (Jeffreys, 1869)

Synonyms
- Assiminopsis Locard, 1897; Hela Jeffreys, 1870 (preoccupied by Hela Muenster, 1840)

= Benthonella =

Genus of gastropods

Benthonella is a genus of minute sea snails, marine gastropod mollusks or micromollusks in the family Rissoidae.

== Species ==
Species within the genus Benthonella include:

- † Benthonella alvaniformis Lozouet, 2014
- † Benthonella bearnensis Lozouet, 2014
- † Benthonella brontodes Lozouet, 1990
- Benthonella decorata (Thiele, 1925)
- † Benthonella loriei Weisbord, 1962
- † Benthonella lutetiana Lozouet, 2014
- Benthonella margaritifera (Watson, 1886)
- † Benthonella priabonica Lozouet, 2014
- Benthonella sculpta (Thiele, 1925)
- Benthonella tenella (Jeffreys, 1869)

Species brought into synonymy

- Benthonella fischeri Dall, 1889: synonym of Benthonella tenella (Jeffreys, 1869)
- Benthonella gaza Dall, 1889: synonym of Benthonella tenella (Jeffreys, 1869)
- Benthonella jeffreysi (Dautzenberg, 1889): synonym of Benthonella tenella (Jeffreys, 1869)
- Benthonella kullenbergi Odhner, 1960: synonym of Benthonella tenella (Jeffreys, 1869)
- Benthonella nisonis Dall, 1889: synonym of Thaleia nisonis (Dall, 1889)
