= Cyclostrema huesonicum =

Scientific classification
- Kingdom: Animalia
- Phylum: Mollusca
- Class: Gastropoda
- Subclass: Vetigastropoda
- Order: Trochida
- Family: Liotiidae
- Genus: Cyclostrema
- Species: C. huesonicum

Binomial name
- Cyclostrema huesonicum (Dall, 1927)

Synonyms
- Liotia (Lippistes) huesonica Dall, 1927

Species of gastropod

Cyclostrema huesonicum, common name the Key West cyclostreme, is a species of sea snail, a marine gastropod mollusk in the family Liotiidae.

== Description ==
The height of the shell attains 4.5 mm.

== Distribution ==
This marine species occurs off the Florida Keys, USA, at a depth of 165 m to 174 m.
