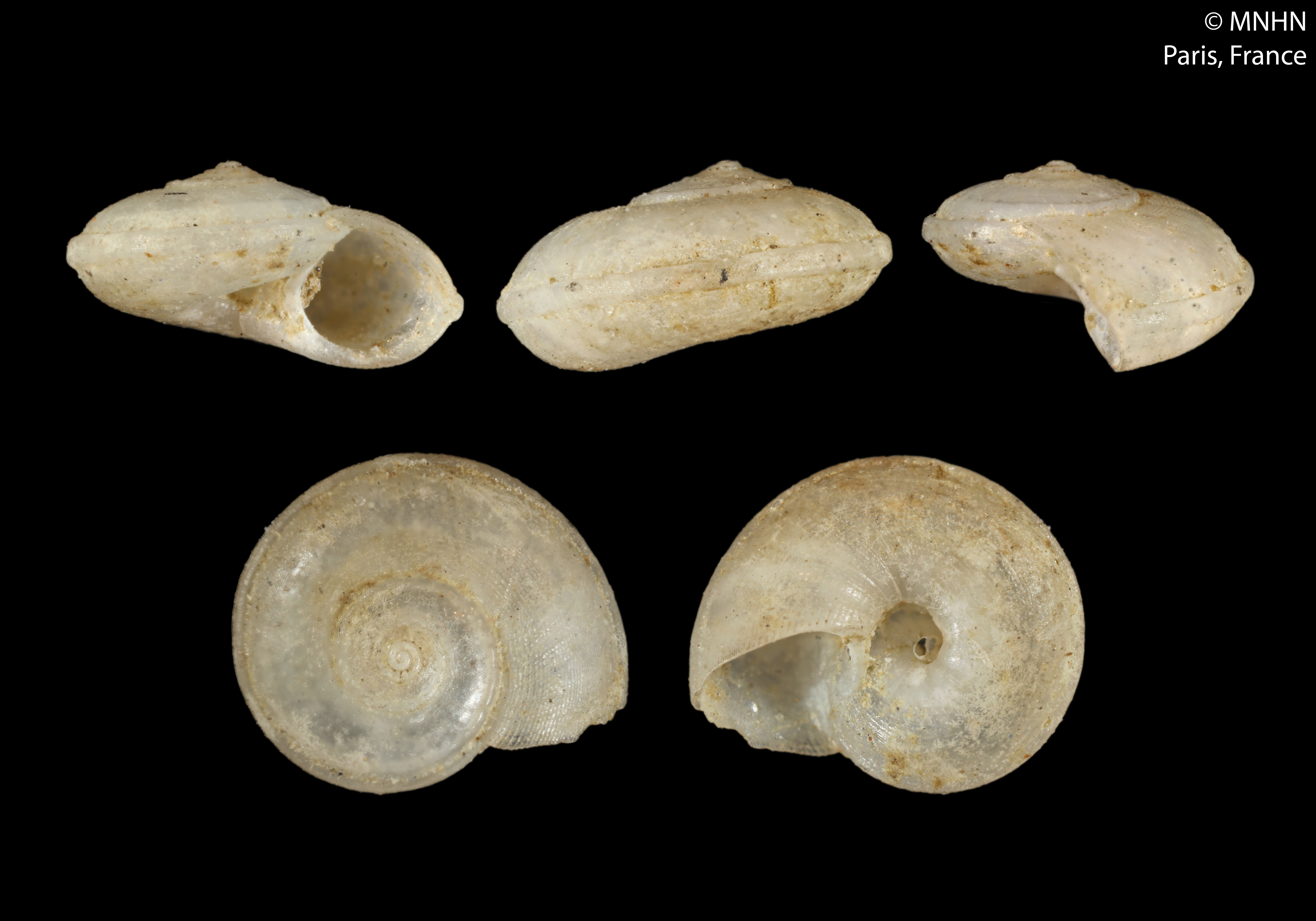
- Shell of Cyclostrema annuliferum (holotype at MNHN, Paris)

Scientific classification
- Kingdom: Animalia
- Phylum: Mollusca
- Class: Gastropoda
- Subclass: Vetigastropoda
- Order: Trochida
- Superfamily: Trochoidea
- Family: Liotiidae
- Genus: Cyclostrema
- Species: C. annuliferum

Binomial name
- Cyclostrema annuliferum Dautzenberg, 1910

= Cyclostrema annuliferum =

Species of gastropod

Cyclostrema annuliferum is a species of sea snail, a marine gastropod mollusk, in the family Liotiidae.

== Description ==
The size of the shell can vary from 3 mm to 0 mm.

== Distribution ==
This marine species occurs off West Africa.
