= Cyclostrema japonicum =

Scientific classification
- Kingdom: Animalia
- Phylum: Mollusca
- Class: Gastropoda
- Subclass: Vetigastropoda
- Order: Trochida
- Superfamily: Trochoidea
- Family: Liotiidae
- Genus: Cyclostrema
- Species: C. japonicum

Binomial name
- Cyclostrema japonicum Sakurai & Habe, 1977

Species of gastropod

Cyclostrema japonicum is a species of sea snail, a marine gastropod mollusk, in the family Liotiidae.

== Distribution ==
This species occurs in Amami Island.
