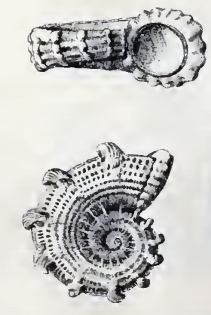
- Original drawing with two views of a shell of Cyclostrema amabile

Scientific classification
- Kingdom: Animalia
- Phylum: Mollusca
- Class: Gastropoda
- Subclass: Vetigastropoda
- Order: Trochida
- Family: Liotiidae
- Genus: Cyclostrema
- Species: C. amabile

Binomial name
- Cyclostrema amabile (Dall, 1889)

Synonyms
- Liotia (Lipistis) amabilis Dall, 1889

= Cyclostrema amabile =

Species of gastropod

Cyclostrema amabile is a species of sea snail, a marine gastropod mollusk in the family Liotiidae.

== Description ==
(Original description by W.H. Dall) The height of the shell attains 6.2 mm. This a rather rare shell. The small, yellowish white, planorboid shell has a wide umbilicus. The shell consists of about four whorls, including a minute smooth nucleus. The whorls are rounded, barely touching, not constantly contiguous but normally enrolled. The spiral sculpture consists of on the upper side six, on the periphery four, and on the base six rounded threads. The peripheral threads are rather larger than the others, all with narrower interspaces. The axial sculpture comprises first, fine elevated lamellae covering the whole shell evenly and giving it a slightly spongy aspect; secondly, on the body whorl, about ten elevations, not perceptibly continuous over the top of the shell but prominent, over the periphery and reflected backward like incomplete varices. The outer whorl is coiled over these so that the whorl inside only touches the outer one by these prominences. They are not continuous over the base, but within the ample umbilicus are two rows of small prominences corresponding in number to those on the periphery. The circular aperture has a complete circular varix which is radiately crenulated. The apex is sunk below the top of the body whorl. The shell has a thick, rounded lip.

== Distribution ==
This species occurs in the Gulf of Mexico, the Caribbean Sea and off Puerto Rico and Barbados.
