= Cyclostrema dollfusi =

Scientific classification
- Kingdom: Animalia
- Phylum: Mollusca
- Class: Gastropoda
- Subclass: Vetigastropoda
- Order: Trochida
- Superfamily: Trochoidea
- Family: Liotiidae
- Genus: Cyclostrema
- Species: C. dollfusi

Binomial name
- Cyclostrema dollfusi Dautzenberg & H. Fischer, 1896

Species of gastropod

Cyclostrema dollfusi is a species of sea snail, a marine gastropod mollusk, in the family Liotiidae.
