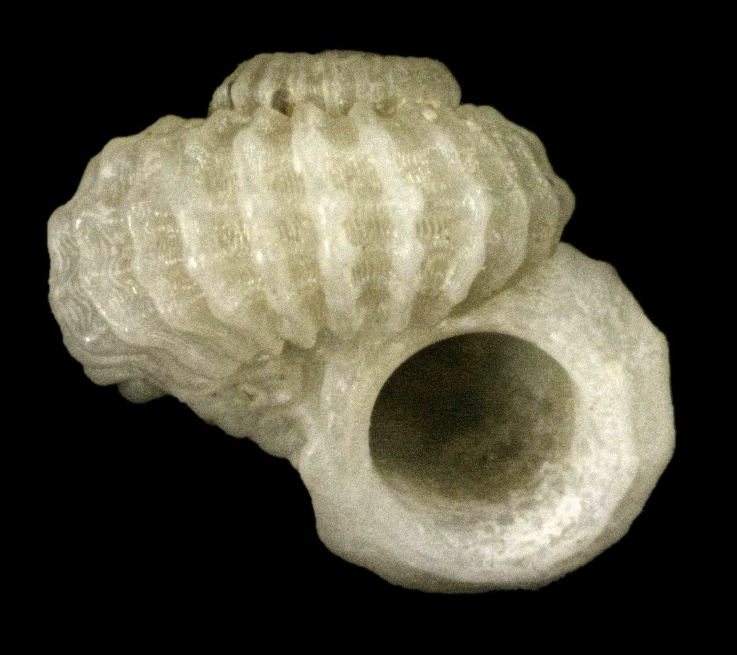
- Shell of Austroliotia darwinensis (specimen at Naturalis Biodiversity Center)

Scientific classification
- Kingdom: Animalia
- Phylum: Mollusca
- Class: Gastropoda
- Subclass: Vetigastropoda
- Order: Trochida
- Family: Liotiidae
- Genus: Austroliotia
- Species: A. darwinensis

Binomial name
- Austroliotia darwinensis (Laseron, 1958)

Synonyms
- Austroliotia botanica darwinensis Laseron, 1958

= Austroliotia darwinensis =

Species of gastropod

Austroliotia darwinensis is a species of sea snail, a marine gastropod mollusk in the family Liotiidae.

== Distribution ==
This marine species occurs off Darwin, Northern Territory, Australia, at depths between 39 m and 190 m.
