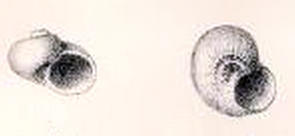
- Original drawing of a shell of Cyclostrema eumares

Scientific classification
- Kingdom: Animalia
- Phylum: Mollusca
- Class: Gastropoda
- Subclass: Vetigastropoda
- Order: Trochida
- Superfamily: Trochoidea
- Family: Liotiidae
- Genus: Cyclostrema
- Species: C. eumares

Binomial name
- Cyclostrema eumares Melvill, 1904

= Cyclostrema eumares =

Species of gastropod

Cyclostrema eumares is a species of sea snail, a marine gastropod mollusk in the family Liotiidae.

== Distribution ==
This marine species occurs in the Gulf of Oman.
