= Cyclostrema carinatum =

- Drawing of a shell of Cyclostrema carinatum

Scientific classification
- Kingdom: Animalia
- Phylum: Mollusca
- Class: Gastropoda
- Subclass: Vetigastropoda
- Order: Trochida
- Superfamily: Trochoidea
- Family: Liotiidae
- Genus: Cyclostrema
- Species: C. carinatum

Binomial name
- Cyclostrema carinatum H. Adams, 1873

Species of gastropod

Cyclostrema carinatum is a species of sea snail, a marine gastropod mollusk in the family Liotiidae.

== Description ==
The diameter of the shell is 2.5 mm. The solid shell is widely umbilicated, with regular, angular spiral carinae. The interstices are radiately sculptured. The 4 whorls are convex and rapidly increasing. The last whorl is dilated in front. The aperture is subcirciilar. The peristome is thickened and subcontinuous.

== Distribution ==
This species occurs in the Persian Gulf.
