= Cyclostrema charmophron =

Scientific classification
- Kingdom: Animalia
- Phylum: Mollusca
- Class: Gastropoda
- Subclass: Vetigastropoda
- Order: Trochida
- Superfamily: Trochoidea
- Family: Liotiidae
- Genus: Cyclostrema
- Species: C. charmophron

Binomial name
- Cyclostrema charmophron Melvill, 1906

Species of gastropod

Cyclostrema charmophron is a species of sea snail, a marine gastropod mollusk in the family Liotiidae.

== Distribution ==
This species occurs in the Persian Gulf.
