= Cyclostrema crassiolatum =

Scientific classification
- Kingdom: Animalia
- Phylum: Mollusca
- Class: Gastropoda
- Subclass: Vetigastropoda
- Order: Trochida
- Superfamily: Trochoidea
- Family: Liotiidae
- Genus: Cyclostrema
- Species: C. crassiolatum

Binomial name
- Cyclostrema crassiolatum Strebel, 1908

Species of gastropod

Cyclostrema crassiolatum is a species of sea snail, a marine gastropod mollusk in the family Liotiidae.

== Distribution ==
This benthic species occurs in the Southeast Pacific Ocean and Antarctic Atlantic Ocean (off South Georgia)
