= Dentarene loculosa =

Scientific classification
- Kingdom: Animalia
- Phylum: Mollusca
- Class: Gastropoda
- Subclass: Vetigastropoda
- Order: Trochida
- Superfamily: Trochoidea
- Family: Liotiidae
- Genus: Dentarene
- Species: D. loculosa

Binomial name
- Dentarene loculosa (Gould, 1859)

Synonyms
- Liotina cycloma Tomlin, 1918; Liotia loculosa Gould, 1859 (original combination)

Species of gastropod

Dentarene loculosa is a species of small sea snail, a marine gastropod mollusk, in the family Liotiidae.

== Description ==
The size of the shell varies between 8 mm and 14 mm.

== Distribution ==
This marine species occurs off Japan and the Philippines.
