= Cithna spirata =

Scientific classification
- Kingdom: Animalia
- Phylum: Mollusca
- Class: Gastropoda
- Subclass: Vetigastropoda
- Order: Trochida
- Superfamily: Trochoidea
- Family: Liotiidae
- Genus: Cithna
- Species: C. spirata

Binomial name
- Cithna spirata A. Adams, 1863

Species of gastropod

Cithna spirata is a species of sea snail, a marine gastropod mollusk, in the family Liotiidae.
