= Cyclostrema sykesi =

Scientific classification
- Kingdom: Animalia
- Phylum: Mollusca
- Class: Gastropoda
- Subclass: Vetigastropoda
- Order: Trochida
- Superfamily: Trochoidea
- Family: Liotiidae
- Genus: Cyclostrema
- Species: C. sykesi

Binomial name
- Cyclostrema sykesi Dautzenberg & H. Fischer, 1897

Species of gastropod

Cyclostrema sykesi is a species of sea snail, a marine gastropod mollusk, in the family Liotiidae.
