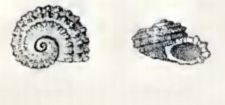
- Drawing with two views of a shell of Cyclostrema exiguum

Scientific classification
- Kingdom: Animalia
- Phylum: Mollusca
- Class: Gastropoda
- Subclass: Vetigastropoda
- Order: Trochida
- Superfamily: Trochoidea
- Family: Liotiidae
- Genus: Cyclostrema
- Species: C. exiguum

Binomial name
- Cyclostrema exiguum Philippi, 1849

Synonyms
- Cyclostrema exigua Philippi, 1849 (wrong gender)

= Cyclostrema exiguum =

Species of gastropod

Cyclostrema exiguum is a species of sea snail, a marine gastropod mollusk in the family Liotiidae.

== Description ==
The diameter of the shell is 2.3 mm. The shell is rather widely umbilicated. It has a subdiscoidal shape with radiating riblets fimbriating four spiral carinae.

== Distribution ==
This species occurs in the Indian Ocean off Madagascar, Réunion and in the Gulf of Aden.
