= Circumstella biconcava =

Scientific classification
- Kingdom: Animalia
- Phylum: Mollusca
- Class: Gastropoda
- Subclass: Vetigastropoda
- Order: Trochida
- Superfamily: Trochoidea
- Family: Liotiidae
- Genus: Circumstella
- Species: C. biconcava

Binomial name
- Circumstella biconcava Feng, 1996

Species of gastropod

Circumstella biconcava is a species of sea snail, a marine gastropod mollusk, in the family Liotiidae.
