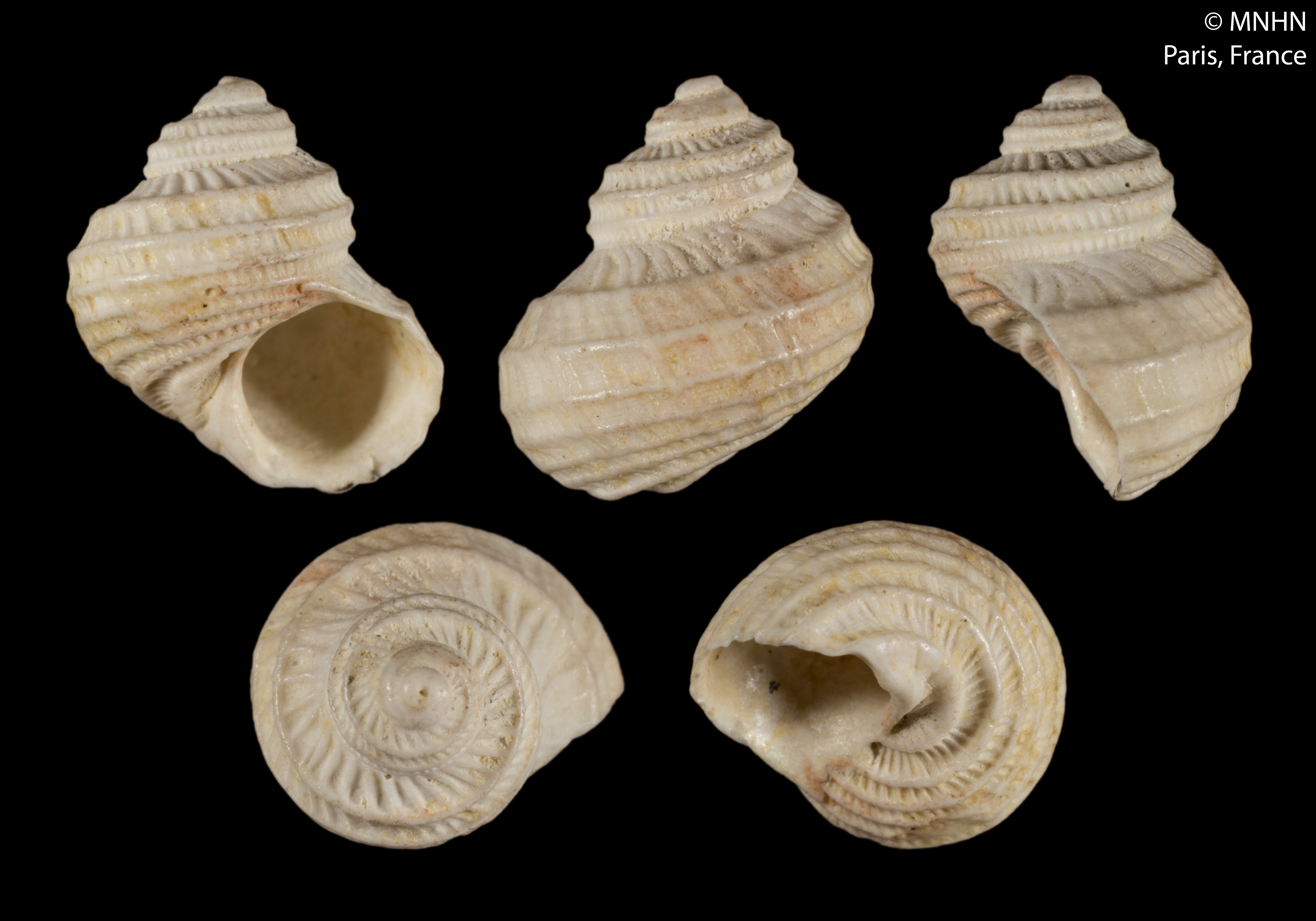
- Shell of Pareuchelus lecointreae (syntype at MNHN, Paris)

Scientific classification
- Kingdom: Animalia
- Phylum: Mollusca
- Class: Gastropoda
- Subclass: Vetigastropoda
- Order: Trochida
- Superfamily: Trochoidea
- Family: Liotiidae
- Genus: †Pareuchelus
- Species: †P. lecointreae

Binomial name
- †Pareuchelus lecointreae (Dollfus & Dautzenberg, 1899)

Synonyms
- Delphinula radiata Millet, 1865; † Parviturbo lecointreae (Dollfus & Dautzenberg, 1899) (superseded combination); Turbo lecointreae Dollfus & Dautzenberg, 1899

= Pareuchelus lecointreae =

Extinct species of gastropod

Pareuchelus lecointreae is an extinct species of sea snail, a marine gastropod mollusk, in the family Liotiidae.

== Distribution ==
This species occurs in France.
