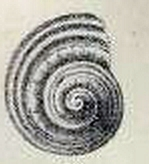
- Original drawing of a shell of Cyclostrema solariellum

Scientific classification
- Kingdom: Animalia
- Phylum: Mollusca
- Class: Gastropoda
- Subclass: Vetigastropoda
- Order: Trochida
- Superfamily: Trochoidea
- Family: Liotiidae
- Genus: Cyclostrema
- Species: C. solariellum

Binomial name
- Cyclostrema solariellum Melvill, 1893

Synonyms
- Cyclosstrema solariellum Melvill, 1893 (misspelling by the author)

= Cyclostrema solariellum =

Species of gastropod

Cyclostrema solariellum is a species of sea snail, a marine gastropod mollusk in the family Liotiidae.

== Description ==
The height of the shell attains 0.5 mm and its diameter 1.5 mm. The thin, whitish shell is depressed and a deep umbilicus. It contains four whorls with the last one rapidly increasing in size. The aperture is ovate. The outer lip is simple. It has a double row of gemmules on the lirae below the sutures, and at the base, around the umbilicus.

== Distribution ==
This marine species occurs off Mumbai, India.
