= Austroliotia pulcherrima =

Scientific classification
- Kingdom: Animalia
- Phylum: Mollusca
- Class: Gastropoda
- Subclass: Vetigastropoda
- Order: Trochida
- Family: Liotiidae
- Genus: Austroliotia
- Species: A. pulcherrima

Binomial name
- Austroliotia pulcherrima (Reeve, 1843)

Synonyms
- Liotia pulcherrima A. Adams, 1850 superseded combination

Species of sea snail, a marine gastropod mollusk

Austroliotia pulcherrima is a species of sea snail, a marine gastropod mollusk in the family Liotiidae.

== Description ==
The height of the shell attains 7 mm.

(Original description) The shell is subdiscoid, with a slightly elevated spire. Its whorls are rounded and very elegantly cancellated with transverse and longitudinal raised ridges; the transverse ridges are muricated. The outer lip is expanded, with a double peristome, each being radiately fimbriated. The umbilicus is very large, and its margins are crenulated.

== Distribution ==
This marine species occurs off New South Wales, South Australia, Victoria and Western Australia.
