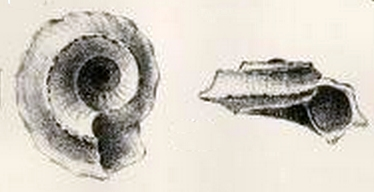
- Original drawing with two views of a shell of Cyclostrema gyalum

Scientific classification
- Kingdom: Animalia
- Phylum: Mollusca
- Class: Gastropoda
- Subclass: Vetigastropoda
- Order: Trochida
- Superfamily: Trochoidea
- Family: Liotiidae
- Genus: Cyclostrema
- Species: C. gyalum

Binomial name
- Cyclostrema gyalum Melvill, 1904

= Cyclostrema gyalum =

Species of gastropod

Cyclostrema gyalum is a species of sea snail, a marine gastropod mollusk in the family Liotiidae.

== Description ==
The height of the shell attains 2 mm, its diameter 5 mm. The shell contains 5 whorls and a minute nucleus. The whorls increase rapidly in size. The body whorl contains three acute keels. The basal keel encircles the umbilicus, which is particularly large and deep compared to the size of the shell. The aperture has a square shape. The thin outer lip is angulate.

== Distribution ==
This species occurs in the Persian Gulf and the Gulf of Oman.
