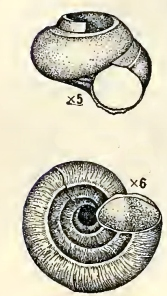
- Original drawing with two views of a shell of Moelleriopsis abyssicola

Scientific classification
- Domain: Eukaryota
- Kingdom: Animalia
- Phylum: Mollusca
- Class: Gastropoda
- Subclass: Vetigastropoda
- Superfamily: Seguenzioidea
- Family: incertae sedis
- Genus: Moelleriopsis; Bush, 1897

Type species
- Moelleriopsis abyssicola Bush, K.J., 1897

Synonyms
- Abyssogyra A.H. Clarke, 1961; Molleriopsis (incorrect subsequent spelling)

= Moelleriopsis =

Genus of gastropods

Moelleriopsis is a genus of sea snails, marine gastropod mollusks unassigned in the superfamily Seguenzioidea.

== Description ==
The small shell of these deep-water species is relatively thin. It is white under a golden brown or olive brown epidermis. It contains few, convex whorls, forming an elevated spire and large body whorl. The suture is distinct. The round and deep umbilicus has a moderate size, showing some of the whorls. The circular aperture is slightly oblique. The peristome is continuous with a thin, sharp edge, appearing thickened within. It is attached to the body whorl only for a short distance.

== Species ==
Species within the genus Moelleriopsis include:

- Moelleriopsis abyssicola Bush, 1897
- Moelleriopsis atlantis Hoffman, Gofas & Freiwald, 2020
- †Moelleriopsis carinaspira Lozouet, 1999
- Moelleriopsis gritta Hoffman in Hoffman, Gofas & Freiwald, 2020
- Moelleriopsis messanensis (Seguenza, 1876)
- Moelleriopsis meteorminora Hoffman, Gofas & Freiwald, 2020
- Moelleriopsis nipponica (Okutani, 1964)
- Moelleriopsis normani (Dautzenberg & H. Fischer, 1897)
- Moelleriopsis poppei Engl, 2012
- Moelleriopsis richardi (Dautzenberg & H. Fischer, 1896)
- Moelleriopsis sincera (Dall, 1890)
- Moelleriopsis valvatoides (Jeffreys, 1883)
- Moelleriopsis vemae (Clarke, 1961)
- Moelleriopsis watsoni (Tryon, 1888)

Species brought into synonymy

- Moelleriopsis valvatoides (Jeffreys, 1883): synonym of Skenea valvatoides (Jeffreys, 1883)
