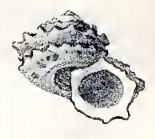
- Drawing with an apertural view of a shell of Dentarene munita

Scientific classification
- Kingdom: Animalia
- Phylum: Mollusca
- Class: Gastropoda
- Subclass: Vetigastropoda
- Order: Trochida
- Superfamily: Trochoidea
- Family: Liotiidae
- Genus: Dentarene
- Species: D. munita

Binomial name
- Dentarene munita Iredale, 1929

Synonyms
- Delphinula muricata Reeve, 1843; Dentarene munitus sic (incorrect gender ending); Liotia muricata Reeve, 1843

= Dentarene munita =

Species of gastropod

Dentarene munita is a species of small sea snail, a marine gastropod mollusk, in the family Liotiidae.

This is a replacement name for Delphinula muricata Reeve, 1843, non Calcara, 1841

== Description ==
The size of the shell varies between 12 mm and 20 mm. The shell is rather narrowly umbilicated. It has a pale orange yellow color, radiated and spotted with a reddish chestnut. The three whorls contain scaly-prickly keels at the periphery and are slopingly flattened above. The suture is excavated. The surface above and below contain minutely beaded revolving striae.

== Distribution ==
This marine species occurs off Queensland, Australia.
