= Cyclostrema ocrinium =

- Original drawing of a shell of Cyclostrema ocrinium

Scientific classification
- Kingdom: Animalia
- Phylum: Mollusca
- Class: Gastropoda
- Subclass: Vetigastropoda
- Order: Trochida
- Superfamily: Trochoidea
- Family: Liotiidae
- Genus: Cyclostrema
- Species: C. ocrinium

Binomial name
- Cyclostrema ocrinium Melvill & Standen, 1901

Synonyms
- Cyclostrema ocrinum Melvill & Standen, 1901 (misspelling)

Species of gastropod

Cyclostrema ocrinium is a species of sea snail, a marine gastropod mollusk in the family Liotiidae.

== Description ==
The height of the shell attains 2 mm, its diameter 3 mm. The delicate, white, umbilicated shell contains four whorls. it is destitute of spiral ribs. The longitudinal riblets are very close and fine, about 26 in number on the five-angled body whorl, that surround the umbilicus at the base being the strongest and most conspicuous. Regular rows of shining gemmae on the costulae at the point of the angular projections take the place of spiral lirae. The interstices are plain, vitreous white. The aperture is circular. The peristome is continuous. The outer lip is crenulate. The columellar margin is not reflexed over the umbilicus, which is deep and conspicuous.

== Distribution ==
This marine species occurs in the Persian Gulf and off Singapore.
