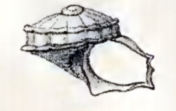
- Drawing of a shell of Cyclostrema cingulatum

Scientific classification
- Kingdom: Animalia
- Phylum: Mollusca
- Class: Gastropoda
- Subclass: Vetigastropoda
- Order: Trochida
- Family: Liotiidae
- Genus: Cyclostrema
- Species: C. cingulatum

Binomial name
- Cyclostrema cingulatum (Philippi, 1852)

Synonyms
- Delphinula cingulata Philippi, 1852

= Cyclostrema cingulatum =

Species of gastropod

Cyclostrema cingulatum is a species of sea snail, a marine gastropod mollusk in the family Liotiidae.

== Description ==
The diameter of the shell is 1.5 mm. The shell is narrowly umbilicated, with radiating low, broadly rounded undulations above, scalloping the periphery. The shell is quadricarinate in the adults, bicarinate in the young, the carinae being more acuate, sinuately dentate, and dotted with brown. The aperture is subcircular in the adult.

== Distribution ==
This species occurs in the Red Sea and in the Indian Ocean off Madagascar.
