= Dentarene rosadoi =

Scientific classification
- Kingdom: Animalia
- Phylum: Mollusca
- Class: Gastropoda
- Subclass: Vetigastropoda
- Order: Trochida
- Family: Liotiidae
- Genus: Dentarene
- Species: D. rosadoi

Binomial name
- Dentarene rosadoi Bozzetti & Ferrario, 2005

Species of gastropod

Dentarene rosadoi is a species of sea snail, a marine gastropod mollusk in the family Turbinidae, the turban snails.
