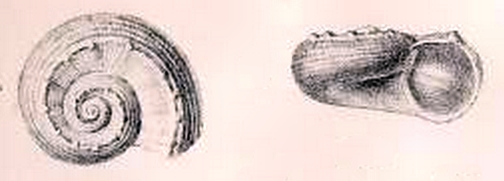
- Original drawing with two views of a shell of Cyclostrema spiculigerum

Scientific classification
- Kingdom: Animalia
- Phylum: Mollusca
- Class: Gastropoda
- Subclass: Vetigastropoda
- Order: Trochida
- Family: Liotiidae
- Genus: Cyclostrema
- Species: C. spiculigerum

Binomial name
- Cyclostrema spiculigerum J.C. Melvill, 1912

= Cyclostrema spiculigerum =

Species of gastropod

Cyclostrema spiculigerum is a species of sea snail, a marine gastropod mollusk in the family Liotiidae.

== Description ==
The height of the shell attains 2 mm, its diameter 3 mm. The small, white shell has a depressed discoidal shape and shows a deep umbilicus. It contains 4 whorls, including the two apical whorls. The aperture is round. The thin peristome is continuous. This species is remarkable for the coronal of equidistal abbreviated spicules, which denote the uppermost and most strongly developed of the spiral lirae in the two lowest whorls.

== Distribution ==
This marine species occurs in the Persian Gulf.
