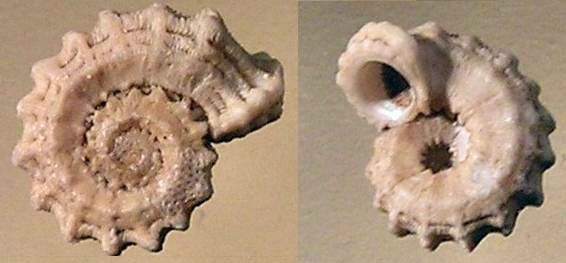
- Two views of a shell of Austroliotia botanica

Scientific classification
- Kingdom: Animalia
- Phylum: Mollusca
- Class: Gastropoda
- Subclass: Vetigastropoda
- Order: Trochida
- Family: Liotiidae
- Genus: Austroliotia
- Species: A. botanica

Binomial name
- Austroliotia botanica (Hedley, 1915)

Synonyms
- Liotia botanica Hedley, 1915; Liotina clathrata Angas, 1871

= Austroliotia botanica =

Species of gastropod

Austroliotia botanica, common name the Botany Bay liotia, is a species of sea snail, a marine gastropod mollusk in the family Liotiidae.

== Description ==
(Original description by Charles Hedley) The height of the shell attains 7 mm. The solid, subdiscoidal, cream-colored shell is convex above. It contains 4½ rounded whorls that are rather loosely coiled. The last whorl increases rapidly, slightly ascends, and then suddenly descends to its termination.

Sculpture : the whole shell is beautifully and delicately cancellated. There are seven spiral cords, two on the shoulder, three on the periphery, one at the margin of the umbilicus and one within it. The upper pair ascend the spire, the lowest peripheral is stronger than the rest. On the last whorl, there are about twenty radials. These ascend the spire, projecting like spokes over the suture. Arising in the sutural trench, they are dormant on the shoulder and are strongly expressed on the periphery. They again fade on the base, but revive in the umbilicus, where they project far into the cavity. At the intersection of the spirals, they form polished knots. A secondary sculpture of fine radial laminae overruns the whole shell. The circular aperture is oblique and guarded by a broad outstanding varix. The umbilicus is broad and perspective.

== Distribution ==
This marine species occurs in the subtidal zone off Australia (New South Wales, Victoria, South Australia, Queensland) and Tasmania.
