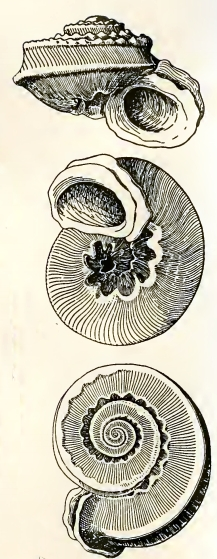
- Original drawing with three views of a shell of Circumstella devexa

Scientific classification
- Kingdom: Animalia
- Phylum: Mollusca
- Class: Gastropoda
- Subclass: Vetigastropoda
- Order: Trochida
- Superfamily: Trochoidea
- Family: Liotiidae
- Genus: Circumstella
- Species: C. devexa

Binomial name
- Circumstella devexa (Hedley, 1901)

Synonyms
- Liotia devexa Hedley, 1901; Liotia walkeri Sowerby III, 1908

= Circumstella devexa =

Species of gastropod

Circumstella devexa is a species of sea snail, a marine gastropod mollusk in the family Liotiidae.

== Description ==
(Original description by Charles Hedley) The height of the shell attains 3.3 mm. The very solid, widely umbilicate shell has a turbinate shape with the whorls in transverse section nearly square. The colour of the dull shell is creamy white. It contains four whorls. The upper two whorls are unsculptured, the last descending steeply and suddenly. The whole surface is densely covered by fine, close, radiating threads. The periphery is flattened, with a keel at the upper and lower angles, the superior crenulated. Outside the deeply impressed suture runs a row of denticules. The base of the shell is flattened. The abrupt margin of the aperture is scalloped. The very oblique aperture is semilunate with two massive lips, one within the other.

== Distribution ==
This marine species occurs off the Northern Territory and Queensland, Australia
