= Globarene =

Scientific classification
- Kingdom: Animalia
- Phylum: Mollusca
- Class: Gastropoda
- Subclass: Vetigastropoda
- Order: Trochida
- Superfamily: Trochoidea
- Family: Liotiidae
- Genus: Globarene; Iredale, 1929

Genus of gastropods

Globarene is a genus of sea snails, marine gastropod mollusks, in the family Liotiidae.

== Species ==
Species within the genus Globarene include:

- Globarene cidaris (Reeve, 1843)
