= Peasiella roepstorffiana =

Scientific classification
- Kingdom: Animalia
- Phylum: Mollusca
- Class: Gastropoda
- Subclass: Caenogastropoda
- Order: Littorinimorpha
- Family: Littorinidae
- Genus: Peasiella
- Species: P. roepstorffiana

Binomial name
- Peasiella roepstorffiana (Nevill, 1885)

Synonyms
- Peasiella roepstorfii [sic] (misspelling); Peasiella templiana (Nevill, 1885); Risella balteata Preston, 1908; Risella roepstorffiana Nevill, 1885; Risella templiana Nevill, 1885; Risella templiana var. nigrofasciata Nevill, 1885; Risella templiana var. subimbricata Nevill, 1885

Species of gastropod

Peasiella roepstorffiana is a species of sea snail, a marine gastropod mollusk in the family Littorinidae, the winkles or periwinkles.
