= Moelleriopsis vemae =

Scientific classification
- Kingdom: Animalia
- Phylum: Mollusca
- Class: Gastropoda
- Subclass: Vetigastropoda
- Family: incertae sedis
- Genus: Moelleriopsis
- Species: M. vemae

Binomial name
- Moelleriopsis vemae (Clarke, 1961)

Synonyms
- Abyssogyra vemae Clarke, 1961 (original combination)

Species of sea snail

Moelleriopsis vemae is a species of sea snail, a marine gastropod mollusk, unassigned in the superfamily Seguenzioidea.

== Description ==
The shell grows to a height of 1.8 mm.

== Distribution ==
This species occurs in the South Atlantic Ocean at bathyal depths.
