= Pseudoliotina stinnesbecki =

Scientific classification
- Kingdom: Animalia
- Phylum: Mollusca
- Class: Gastropoda
- Subclass: Vetigastropoda
- Order: Trochida
- Superfamily: Trochoidea
- Family: Skeneidae
- Genus: Pseudoliotina
- Species: †P. stinnesbecki

Binomial name
- †Pseudoliotina stinnesbecki Kiel & Bandel, 2002

Extinct species of gastropod

Pseudoliotina stinnesbecki is an extinct species of sea snail, a marine gastropod mollusk, in the family Skeneidae.
