= Leotropa =

Scientific classification
- Kingdom: Animalia
- Phylum: Arthropoda
- Class: Insecta
- Order: Lepidoptera
- Family: Pyralidae
- Tribe: Anerastiini
- Genus: Leotropa; Hampson, 1918

Genus of moths

Leotropa is a genus of snout moths. It was described by George Hampson in 1918.

== Species ==
- Leotropa papuanensis Hampson, 1918
- Leotropa phoenicias Hampson, 1918
- Leotropa sarcina Hampson, 1918
