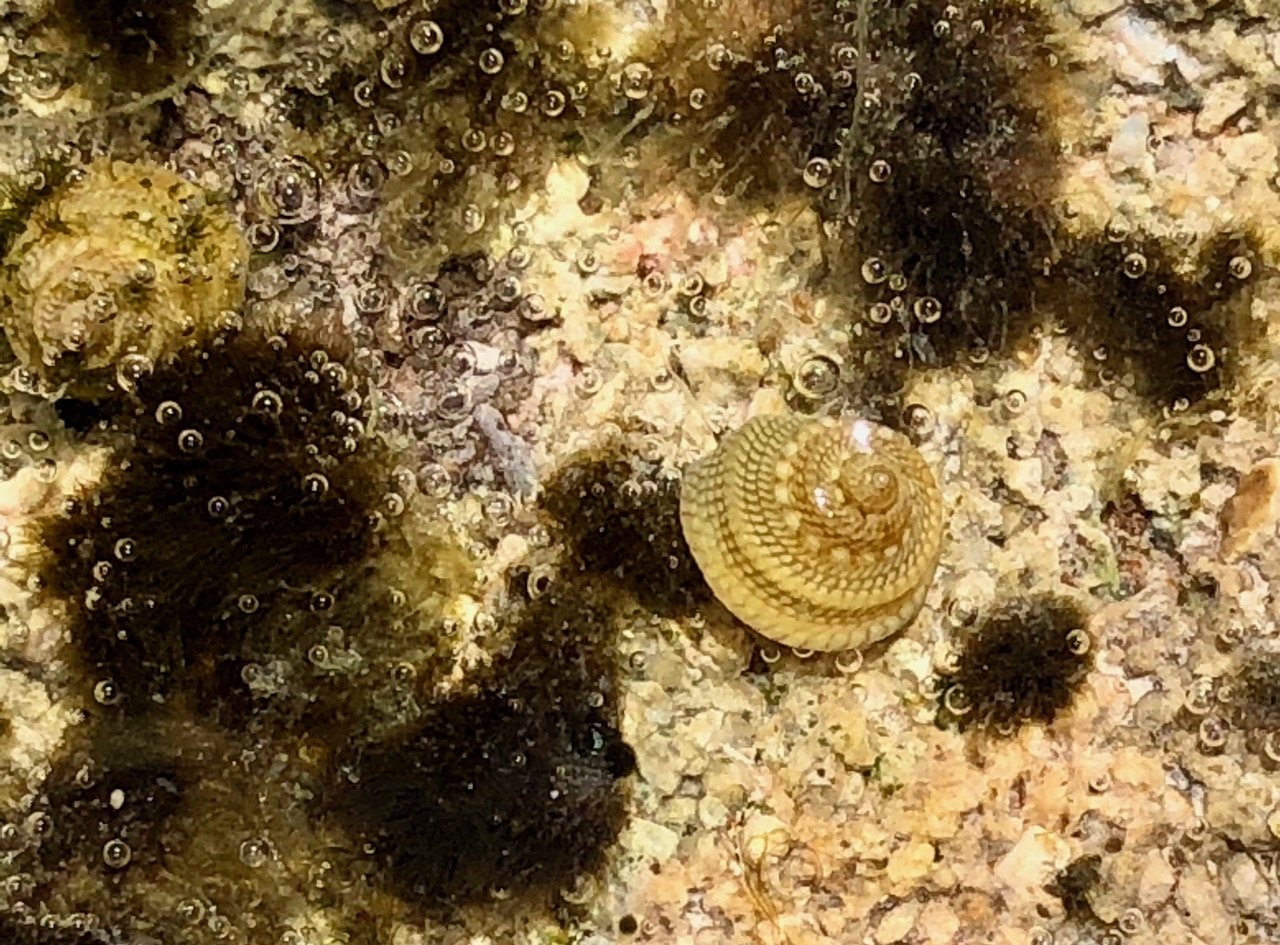

Scientific classification
- Kingdom: Animalia
- Phylum: Mollusca
- Class: Gastropoda
- Subclass: Caenogastropoda
- Order: Littorinimorpha
- Family: Littorinidae
- Genus: Peasiella
- Species: P. tantilla

Binomial name
- Peasiella tantilla (Gould, 1849)

Synonyms
- Margarita angulata A. Adams, 1853; Risella parvula Dunker, 1861; Trochus diminutivus Reeve, 1862; Trochus tantillus Gould, 1849

= Peasiella tantilla =

Species of sea snail

Peasiella tantilla is a species of sea snail, a marine gastropod mollusk in the family Littorinidae, the winkles or periwinkles.

== Description and biology ==
Peasiella tantilla is five millimeters in length and diameter. The shell of Peasiella tantilla is a spiral shape and its body symmetry is "dextrally coiled". Their shell also extends all the way down to the base and tends to be light brown to yellow. The shell of Peasiella tantilla can also have little white spots on the shell.

== Distribution and habitat ==
Peasiella tantilla reside in the Indo-Pacific. Their marine habitat is the marine benthic. Peasiella tantilla is abundant along the coast of the supratidal region where they are commonly found in pools and are close to the sea. Peasiella tantilla occurs mainly throughout the Pacific Ocean. Examples of places they occur are the Hawaiian Islands, Oceania, Indo-China, and Indo-Malaysia.
