= Rotaliotina springsteeni =

Scientific classification
- Kingdom: Animalia
- Phylum: Mollusca
- Class: Gastropoda
- Subclass: Vetigastropoda
- Order: Trochida
- Superfamily: Trochoidea
- Family: Liotiidae
- Genus: Rotaliotina
- Species: R. springsteeni

Binomial name
- Rotaliotina springsteeni McLean, 1988

Synonyms
- Pseudoliotina springsteeni J. H. McLean, 1988 ·

Species of gastropod

Rotaliotina springsteeni is a species of small sea snail, a marine gastropod mollusk, in the family Liotiidae.

== Description ==
The diameter of the nearly planispiral shell varies between 8 mm and 10 mm. The shell contains 3.5 whorls with blunt double spines.

== Distribution ==
This marine species occurs off the Philippines and Thailand.

== Etymology ==
R. springsteeni is named after Foster James "Jim" Springsteen, an amateur malacologist who published Shells of the Philippines.
