= Peasiella conoidalis =

Scientific classification
- Kingdom: Animalia
- Phylum: Mollusca
- Class: Gastropoda
- Subclass: Caenogastropoda
- Order: Littorinimorpha
- Family: Littorinidae
- Genus: Peasiella
- Species: P. conoidalis

Binomial name
- Peasiella conoidalis (Pease, 1868)

Synonyms
- Echinella gaidei Montrouzier in Souverbie & Montrouzier, 1879; Trochus conoidalis Pease, 1868

Species of gastropod

Peasiella conoidalis is a species of sea snail, a marine gastropod mollusk in the family Littorinidae, the winkles or periwinkles.
