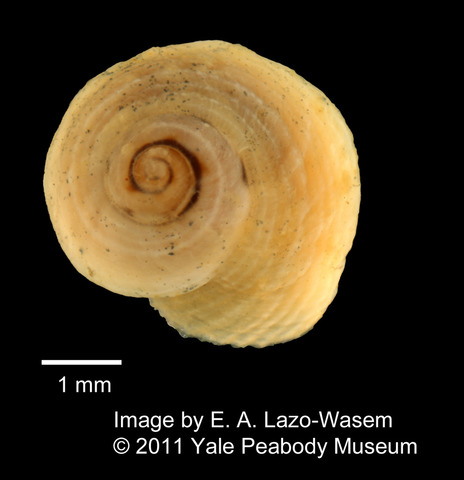

Scientific classification
- Kingdom: Animalia
- Phylum: Mollusca
- Class: Gastropoda
- Subclass: Caenogastropoda
- Order: Littorinimorpha
- Family: Littorinidae
- Genus: Peasiella
- Species: P. isseli

Binomial name
- Peasiella isseli (Issel, 1869)

Synonyms
- List: Risella isseli Issel, 1869; Risella isseli var. carinata Pallary, 1926; Risella isseli var. undata Pallary, 1926; Trochus sismondae Issel, 1869; Umbonella sismondae (Issel, 1869)

= Peasiella isseli =

Species of gastropod

Peasiella isseli is a species of sea snail, a marine gastropod mollusk in the family Littorinidae, the winkles or periwinkles.

== Description ==
The height of the shell attains 4 mm, its diameter also 4 mm. The small, imperforate, greenish shell has a conoid shape. It contains minute, transverse striae. The apex is obtuse. The 4 1/2 whorls increase slowly in size. They are slightly convex and have a distinct suture. The body whorl takes up half of the total length. Its base is angulated and shows on its lower parts four concentric ribs. The oblique aperture is subcircular.

== Distribution ==
This species occurs in the Red Sea on coral reefs.
