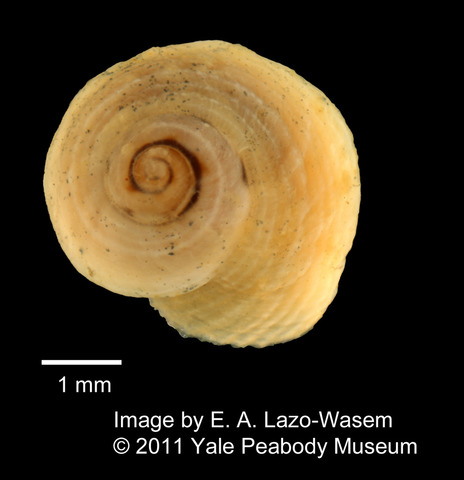
- Peasiella isseli

Scientific classification
- Kingdom: Animalia
- Phylum: Mollusca
- Class: Gastropoda
- Subclass: Caenogastropoda
- Order: Littorinimorpha
- Family: Littorinidae
- Subfamily: Littorininae
- Genus: Peasiella; Nevill, 1885

Type species
- Trochus tantillus Gould, 1849

= Peasiella =

Genus of gastropods

Peasiella is a genus of sea snails, marine gastropod molluscs in the family Littorinidae, the winkles or periwinkles.

== Species ==
Species within the genus Peasiella include:

- Peasiella conoidalis (Pease, 1868)
- Peasiella fasciata Reid & Mak, 1998
- Peasiella fuscopiperata (Turton, 1932)
- Peasiella habei Reid & Mak, 1998
- Peasiella infracostata (Issel, 1869)
- Peasiella isseli (Semper in Issel, 1869)
- Peasiella lutulenta Reid, 1989
- Peasiella mauritiana (Viader, 1951)
- Peasiella patula Reid & Mak, 1998
- Peasiella roepstorffiana (Nevill, 1885)
- Peasiella tantilla (Gould, 1849)

Species brought into synonymy

- Peasiella roepstorfii [sic]: synonym of Peasiella roepstorffiana (Nevill, 1885)
- Peasiella roosevelti Bartsch & Rehder, 1939: synonym of Echinolittorina porcata (Philippi, 1846)
- Peasiella templiana (Nevill, 1885): synonym of Peasiella roepstorffiana (Nevill, 1885)
