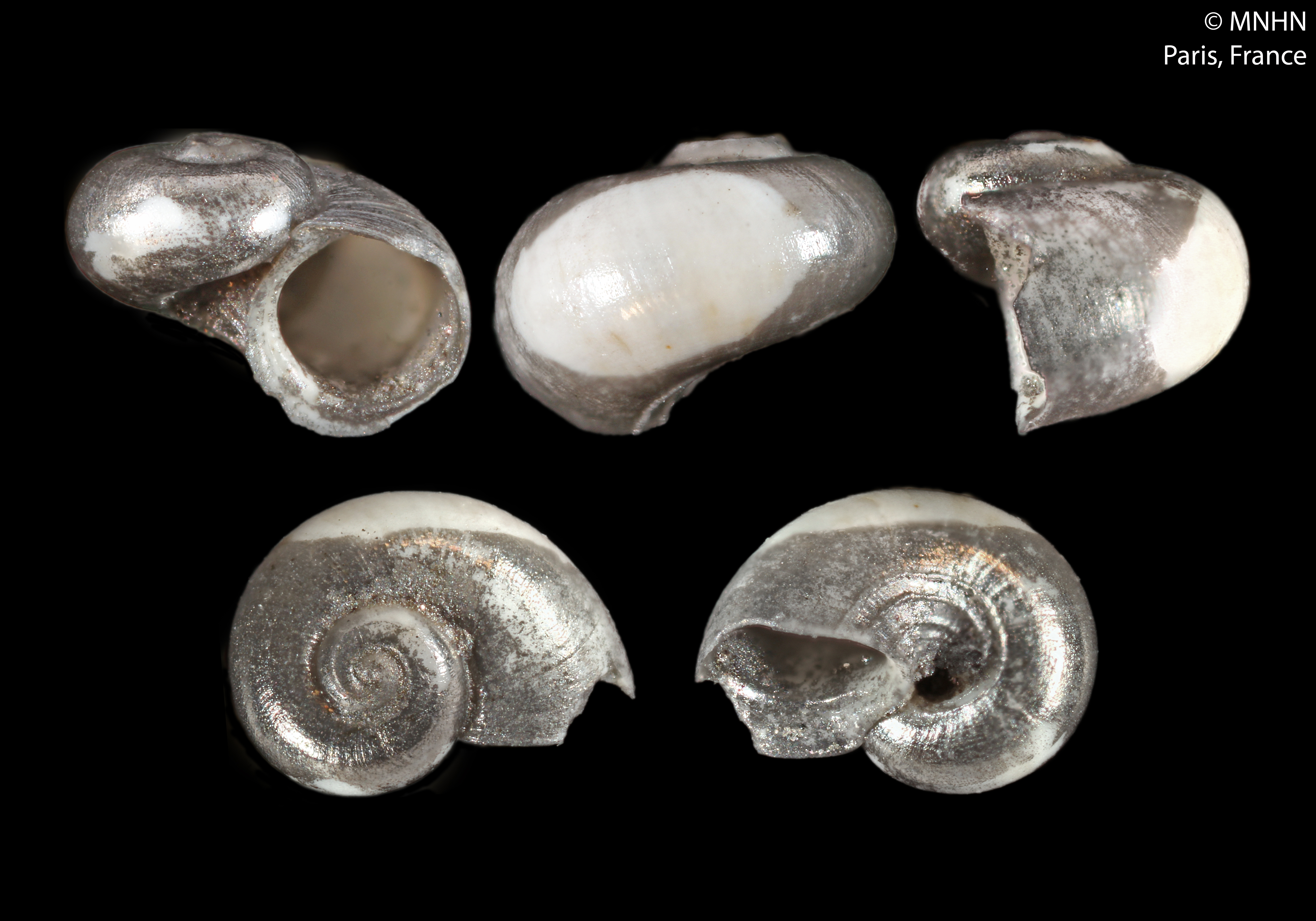
- Shell of Moelleriopsis carinaspira (holotype at MNHN, Paris)

Scientific classification
- Kingdom: Animalia
- Phylum: Mollusca
- Class: Gastropoda
- Subclass: Vetigastropoda
- Family: incertae sedis
- Genus: Moelleriopsis
- Species: †M. carinaspira

Binomial name
- †Moelleriopsis carinaspira Lozouet, 1999

= Moelleriopsis carinaspira =

Extinct species of gastropod

Moelleriopsis carinaspira is an extinct species of sea snail, a marine gastropod mollusk, unassigned in the superfamily Seguenzioidea.

== Description ==
The length of the shell attains 2 mm.

== Distribution ==
This species occurs in France.
