= Moelleriopsis sincera =

Scientific classification
- Kingdom: Animalia
- Phylum: Mollusca
- Class: Gastropoda
- Subclass: Vetigastropoda
- Family: incertae sedis
- Genus: Moelleriopsis
- Species: M. sincera

Binomial name
- Moelleriopsis sincera (Dall, 1890)

Synonyms
- Adeorbis sincerus Dall, 1890 (original combination); Molleriopsis sincera (Dall, 1890)

Species of gastropod

Moelleriopsis sincera is a species of sea snail, a marine gastropod mollusk, unassigned in the superfamily Seguenzioidea.

== Description ==
The height of the shell attains 3.3 mm.

== Distribution ==
This species occurs in the Atlantic Ocean off Georgia, USA and Northern Brazil at depths between 535 m and 805 m.
