= Moelleriopsis poppei =

Scientific classification
- Domain: Eukaryota
- Kingdom: Animalia
- Phylum: Mollusca
- Class: Gastropoda
- Subclass: Vetigastropoda
- Family: incertae sedis
- Genus: Moelleriopsis
- Species: M. poppei

Binomial name
- Moelleriopsis poppei Engl, 2012

Synonyms
- Lacuna abyssicola Melvill & Standen, 1912 (Invalid: junior secondary homonym of Moelleriopsis abyssicola Bush, 1897; Moelleriopsis poppei is a replacement name)

Species of gastropod

Moelleriopsis poppei is a species of sea snail, a marine gastropod mollusk, unassigned in the superfamily Seguenzioidea.

== Distribution ==
This species is found in the Weddell Sea, Antarctica.

== Description ==
The maximum recorded shell length is 2.15 mm.

== Habitat ==
Minimum recorded depth is 2579 m. Maximum recorded depth is 2579 m.
