= Retigyra =

Scientific classification
- Kingdom: Animalia
- Phylum: Mollusca
- Class: Gastropoda
- Subclass: Vetigastropoda
- Order: Trochida
- Family: Turbinidae
- Genus: Retigyra; Warén, 1989

Type species
- Retigyra millipunctata Friele, H., 1886

Genus of gastropods

Retigyra is a genus of sea snails, marine gastropod mollusks, unassigned in the superfamily Seguenzioidea.

== Species ==
Species within the genus Retigyra include:

- Retigyra granulosa (Sykes, 1925)
- Retigyra iheringi (Dautzenberg & H. Fischer, 1897)
- Retigyra millipunctata (Friele, 1886)
