= Rotaliotina =

Scientific classification
- Kingdom: Animalia
- Phylum: Mollusca
- Class: Gastropoda
- Subclass: Vetigastropoda
- Order: Trochida
- Superfamily: Trochoidea
- Family: Liotiidae
- Genus: Rotaliotina; S.-I Huang, 2023

Genus of gastropods

Rotaliotina is a genus of small sea snails, marine gastropod mollusks in the family Liotiidae.

== Species ==
Species within the genus Rotaliotina include:

- Rotaliotina discoidea (Reeve, 1843)
- Rotaliotina springsteeni (McLean, 1988)
