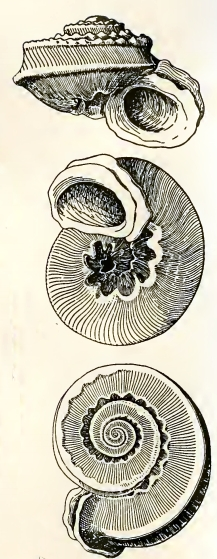
- Circumstella devexa

Scientific classification
- Kingdom: Animalia
- Phylum: Mollusca
- Class: Gastropoda
- Subclass: Vetigastropoda
- Order: Trochida
- Superfamily: Trochoidea
- Family: Liotiidae
- Genus: Circumstella; Laseron, 1958

Type species
- Liotia devexa Hedley, C., 1901

= Circumstella =

Genus of gastropods

Circumstella is a genus of sea snails, marine gastropod mollusks in the family Liotiidaewithin the superfamily Trochoidea, the top snails, turban snails and their allies.

== Species ==
Species within the genus Circumstella include:

- Circumstella biconcava Feng, 1996
- Circumstella biconcave Feng, 1996
- Circumstella devexa (Hedley, 1901)
