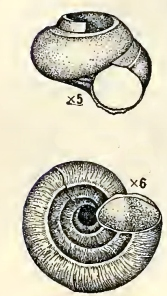
- Original drawing with two views of a shell of Moelleriopsis abyssicola

Scientific classification
- Domain: Eukaryota
- Kingdom: Animalia
- Phylum: Mollusca
- Class: Gastropoda
- Subclass: Vetigastropoda
- Family: incertae sedis
- Genus: Moelleriopsis
- Species: M. abyssicola

Binomial name
- Moelleriopsis abyssicola Bush, 1897

Synonyms
- Molleriopsis abyssicola Bush, 1897

= Moelleriopsis abyssicola =

Species of gastropod

Moelleriopsis abyssicola is a species of sea snail, a marine gastropod mollusk unassigned in the superfamily Seguenzioidea.

== Description ==
(Original description by Bush) The shell grows to a length of 3.2 mm. The small shell is opaque white, under a golden brown epidermis. It contains few convex whorls (the tip is broken away) forming a well-elevated spire and large body whorl. The surface is lustrous where rubbed, ornamented with a single conspicuous carina which defines a broad, flattened sutural area and makes the whorls slightly angulated. This is roughened by the crossing of the growth lines, which are elsewhere inconspicuous. On the base surrounding the umbilicus there are also four more prominent carina, about equal in size and evenly separated by wide, slightly concave interspaces. The first one is situated about the middle of the base, and the last one well up in the umbilicus. On all of these, the lines of growth are so conspicuous as to give them a distinctly beaded appearance. At their termination they form distinct points on the somewhat expanded thin edge of the peristome. The aperture within is dull, opaque white, with a narrow, much thinner, semi-transparent, somewhat expanded, sharp-edged border. This gives the appearance of thickening, but there is no raised opaque white line, said by some author to be the distinguishing character of Moelleria.

== Distribution ==
This species is distributed in the Northwest Atlantic Ocean.
