= Pseudoliotina sensuyi =

Scientific classification
- Kingdom: Animalia
- Phylum: Mollusca
- Class: Gastropoda
- Subclass: Vetigastropoda
- Order: Trochida
- Superfamily: Trochoidea
- Family: Skeneidae
- Genus: Pseudoliotina
- Species: †P. sensuyi

Binomial name
- †Pseudoliotina sensuyi (Vidal, 1921)

Synonyms
- Liotia sensuyi Vidal, 1921

Extinct species of gastropod

Pseudoliotina sensuyi is an extinct species of sea snail, a marine gastropod mollusk, in the family Skeneidae.
