= Peasiella habei =

Scientific classification
- Kingdom: Animalia
- Phylum: Mollusca
- Class: Gastropoda
- Subclass: Caenogastropoda
- Order: Littorinimorpha
- Family: Littorinidae
- Genus: Peasiella
- Species: P. habei

Binomial name
- Peasiella habei Reid & Mak, 1998

Synonyms
- Littorina-capsula habei Tokioka, 1950

Species of gastropod

Peasiella habei is a species of sea snail, a marine gastropod mollusk in the family Littorinidae, the winkles or periwinkles.
