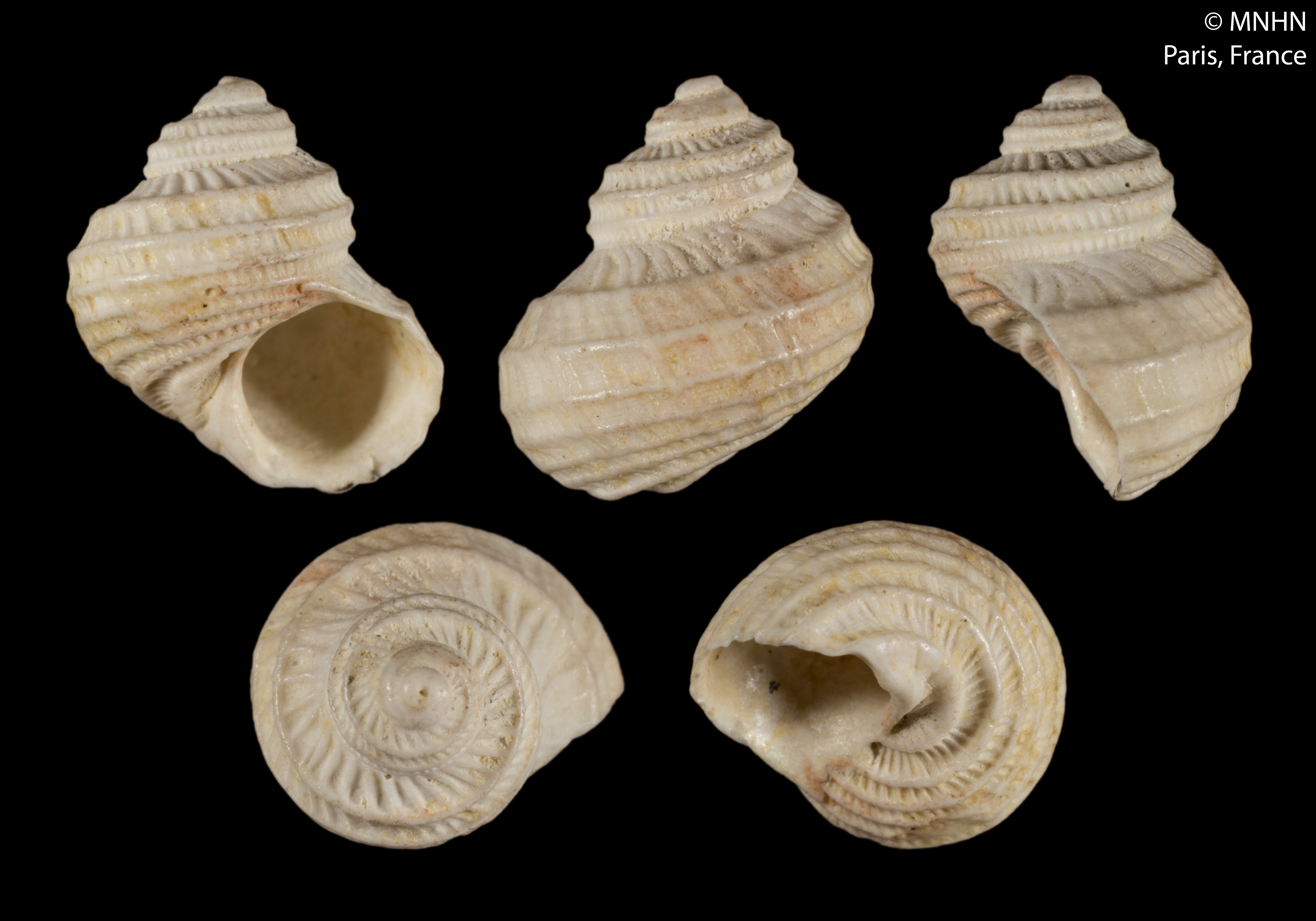
- Shell of † Pareuchelus lecointreae

Scientific classification
- Kingdom: Animalia
- Phylum: Mollusca
- Class: Gastropoda
- Subclass: Vetigastropoda
- Order: Trochida
- Superfamily: Trochoidea
- Family: Liotiidae
- Genus: †Pareuchelus; O. Boettger, 1907

Synonyms
- † Euchelus (Pareuchelus) O. Boettger, 1907

= Pareuchelus =

Extinct genus of gastropods

Pareuchelus is an extinct genus of sea snails, marine gastropod mollusks, in the family Liotiidae.

== Species ==
Species within the genus Pareuchelus include:

- † Pareuchelus dautzenbergi Landau, Van Dingenen & Ceulemans, 2017
- † Pareuchelus lecointreae (Dollfus & Dautzenberg, 1899)
