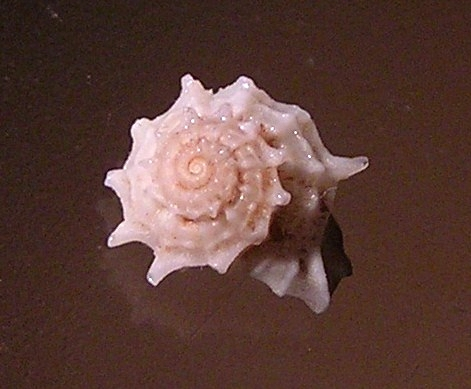
- Shell of Dentarene sarcina

Scientific classification
- Kingdom: Animalia
- Phylum: Mollusca
- Class: Gastropoda
- Subclass: Vetigastropoda
- Order: Trochida
- Family: Liotiidae
- Genus: Dentarene; Iredale, 1929

Type species
- Dentarene sarcina Iredale, 1929

= Dentarene =

Genus of gastropods

Dentarene is a genus of sea snails, marine gastropod mollusks in the family Liotiidae.

== Description ==
The special characteristics of this genus are

- a white shell
- a strongly varicose lip
- the umbilical ridge becomes a twisted appendage of the columellar region of the inner lip
- there is almost no axial sculpture, or it becomes interrupted except between the two peripheral keels.

== Distribution ==
The species of this genus occurs in the tropical Indo-West Pacific.

== Species ==
Species within the genus Dentarene include:

- Dentarene loculosa (Gould, 1859)
- Dentarene munita Iredale, 1929
- Dentarene rosadoi Bozzetti & Ferrario, 2005
- Dentarene sarcina Iredale, 1929

Species brought into synonymy

- Dentarene munitus [sic]: synonym of Dentarene munita Iredale, 1929
