= Peasiella patula =

Scientific classification
- Kingdom: Animalia
- Phylum: Mollusca
- Class: Gastropoda
- Subclass: Caenogastropoda
- Order: Littorinimorpha
- Family: Littorinidae
- Genus: Peasiella
- Species: P. patula

Binomial name
- Peasiella patula Reid & Mak, 1998

Species of gastropod

Peasiella patula is a species of sea snail, a marine gastropod mollusk in the family Littorinidae, the winkles or periwinkles.
