= Peasiella mauritiana =

Scientific classification
- Kingdom: Animalia
- Phylum: Mollusca
- Class: Gastropoda
- Subclass: Caenogastropoda
- Order: Littorinimorpha
- Family: Littorinidae
- Genus: Peasiella
- Species: P. mauritiana

Binomial name
- Peasiella mauritiana (Viader, 1951)

Synonyms
- Risella isseli var. mauritiana Viader, 1951

Species of gastropod

Peasiella mauritiana is a species of sea snail, a marine gastropod mollusk in the family Littorinidae, the winkles or periwinkles.
