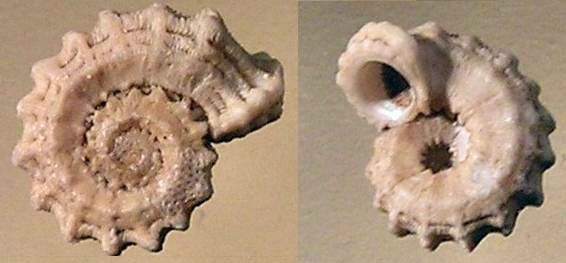
- Austroliotia botanica

Scientific classification
- Kingdom: Animalia
- Phylum: Mollusca
- Class: Gastropoda
- Subclass: Vetigastropoda
- Order: Trochida
- Superfamily: Trochoidea
- Family: Liotiidae
- Genus: Austroliotia; Cotton, 1948

Type species
- Liotia (Austroliotia) botanica, Hedley 1915

Synonyms
- Liotina (Austroliotia), Ladd, 1966

= Austroliotia =

Genus of gastropods

Austroliotia is a genus of sea snails, marine gastropod mollusks in the family Liotiidae.

== Distribution ==
They can be found under stones in the intertidal zone of the temperate coastal waters of Australia and Tasmania.

== Species ==
According to the Indo-Pacific Molluscan Database, the genus Austroliotia consists of the following species with names in current use

- Austroliotia australis (Kiener, 1839)
- Austroliotia botanica (Hedley, 1915)
- Austroliotia darwinensis (Laseron, 1958)
- Austroliotia densilineata (Tate, 1899)
- Austroliotia pulcherrima (Reeve, 1843)
- Austroliotia scalaris (Hedley, 1903)
- Austroliotia warnii †(Defrance, 1818)

Species brought into synonymy

- Austroliotia saxa (Laseron, 1954): synonym of Austroliotia scalaris (Hedley, 1903)
