= Pterarene =

Scientific classification
- Kingdom: Animalia
- Phylum: Mollusca
- Class: Gastropoda
- Subclass: Vetigastropoda
- Order: Trochida
- Superfamily: Trochoidea
- Family: Liotiidae
- Genus: Pterarene; Sakurai & Habe, 1977

Type species
- Pterarene sakashitai Sakurai & Habe, 1977

Genus of gastropods

Pterarene is a genus of small sea snails, marine gastropod mollusks in the family Liotiidae.

== Species ==
Species within the genus Pterarene include:

- Pterarene sakashitai Sakurai & Habe, 1977
