= Retigyra granulosa =

Scientific classification
- Kingdom: Animalia
- Phylum: Mollusca
- Class: Gastropoda
- Subclass: Vetigastropoda
- Order: Trochida
- Family: Turbinidae
- Genus: Retigyra
- Species: R. granulosa

Binomial name
- Retigyra granulosa (Sykes, 1925)

Synonyms
- Homalogyra granulosa Sykes 1925 (original combination)

Species of gastropod

Retigyra granulosa is a species of sea snail, a marine gastropod mollusk, unassigned in the superfamily Seguenzioidea.

== Description ==
The shell grows to a height of 1.7 mm.

== Distribution ==
This bathyal species occurs in European waters on the Gorringe Bank off Portugal.
