= Peasiella lutulenta =

Scientific classification
- Kingdom: Animalia
- Phylum: Mollusca
- Class: Gastropoda
- Subclass: Caenogastropoda
- Order: Littorinimorpha
- Family: Littorinidae
- Genus: Peasiella
- Species: P. lutulenta

Binomial name
- Peasiella lutulenta Reid, 1989

Species of gastropod

Peasiella lutulenta is a species of sea snail, a marine gastropod mollusk in the family Littorinidae, the winkles or periwinkles.
