= Peasiella infracostata =

Scientific classification
- Kingdom: Animalia
- Phylum: Mollusca
- Class: Gastropoda
- Subclass: Caenogastropoda
- Order: Littorinimorpha
- Family: Littorinidae
- Genus: Peasiella
- Species: P. infracostata

Binomial name
- Peasiella infracostata (Issel, 1869)

Synonyms
- Bembicium infracostata (Issel, 1869); Risella infracostata Issel, 1869; Risella tantilla var. subinfracostata Nevill, 1885

Species of gastropod

Peasiella infracostata is a species of sea snail, a marine gastropod mollusk in the family Littorinidae, the winkles or periwinkles.
