= Klebyella =

Scientific classification
- Kingdom: Animalia
- Phylum: Mollusca
- Class: Gastropoda
- Subclass: Vetigastropoda
- Order: Trochida
- Superfamily: Trochoidea
- Family: Liotiidae
- Genus: †Klebyella; Gründel, 1998

Genus of sea snails

Klebyella is an extinct genus of sea snails, marine gastropod mollusks, in the family Liotiidae.

== Species ==
The following species were brought into synonymy:

- Klebyella minuta Bandel, Gründel & Maxwell, 2000
