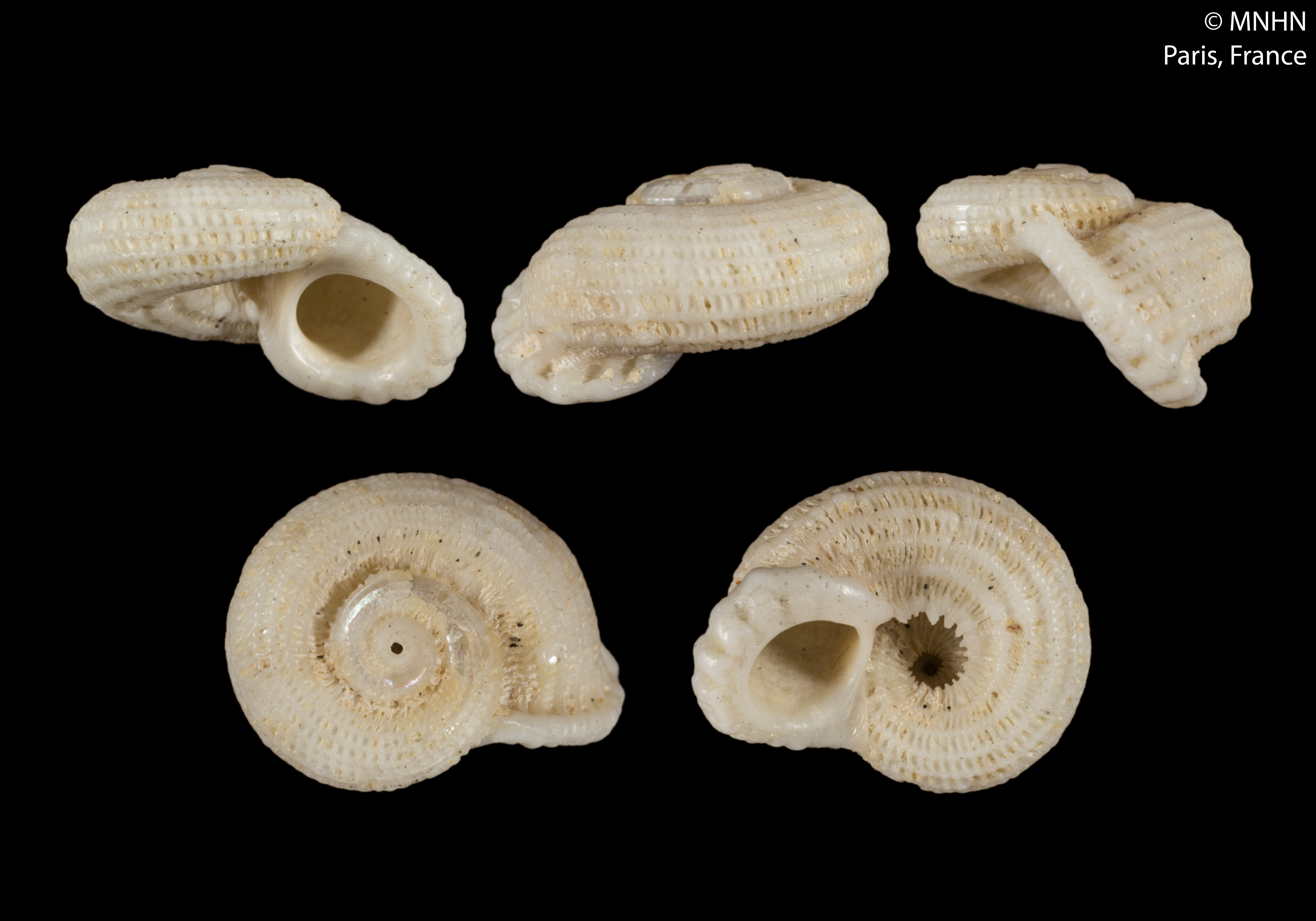
- Shell of Austroliotia australis (lectotype at MNHN, Paris)

Scientific classification
- Kingdom: Animalia
- Phylum: Mollusca
- Class: Gastropoda
- Subclass: Vetigastropoda
- Order: Trochida
- Family: Liotiidae
- Genus: Austroliotia
- Species: A. australis

Binomial name
- Austroliotia australis (Kiener, 1839)

Synonyms
- Liotina australis Kiener, 1839

= Austroliotia australis =

Species of gastropod

Austroliotia australis, commonly known as the southern liotia, is a species of sea snail, a marine gastropod mollusk in the family Liotiidae.

== Description ==
The shell reaches a height of 18 mm. It is white to light brown and features a pronounced umbilicus. The rounded whorls are marked by spiral riblets and longitudinal striae. A beaded riblet extends into the umbilicus. The peristome is varicose, with the inner margin extending below and above.

== Distribution ==
This marine species occurs in the subtidal zone off Australia (New South Wales, Victoria, South Australia, Western Australia) and Tasmania.
