= Rotaliotina discoidea =

- Drawing of a shell of Rotaliotina discoidea

Scientific classification
- Kingdom: Animalia
- Phylum: Mollusca
- Class: Gastropoda
- Subclass: Vetigastropoda
- Order: Trochida
- Superfamily: Trochoidea
- Family: Liotiidae
- Genus: Rotaliotina
- Species: R. discoidea

Binomial name
- Rotaliotina discoidea (Reeve, 1843)

Synonyms
- Delphinula discoidea Reeve, 1843; Liotia discoidea Reeve, 1843; Pseudoliotina discoidea (Reeve, 1843)

Species of gastropod

Rotaliotina discoidea, common name the discoid delphinula, is a species of small sea snail, a marine gastropod mollusk, in the family Liotiidae.

== Description ==
The size of the shell varies between 4 mm and 9 mm. The shell has a discoidal shape, with a flattened spire. The periphery shows two prominent ribs, connected by lattices which a subspinously project. The surface contains clathrate ridges, the interstices of which are finely striated.

== Distribution ==
This marine species occurs off the Philippines, Papua New Guinea and Australia (Queensland) and Norfolk Island and Lord Howe Island.
