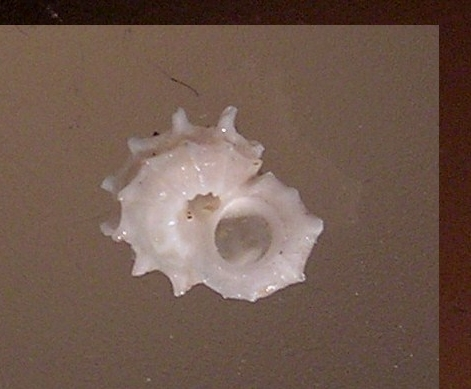
- Shell of Dentarene sarcina

Scientific classification
- Kingdom: Animalia
- Phylum: Mollusca
- Class: Gastropoda
- Subclass: Vetigastropoda
- Order: Trochida
- Superfamily: Trochoidea
- Family: Liotiidae
- Genus: Dentarene
- Species: D. sarcina

Binomial name
- Dentarene sarcina Iredale, 1929

= Dentarene sarcina =

Species of gastropod

Dentarene sarcina, common name the spiny wheel shell, is a species of sea snail, a marine gastropod mollusk in the family Liotiidae.

== Description ==
The size of the shell varies between 8 mm and 13 mm.

== Distribution ==
This marine species occurs in the Western Pacific Ocean and off the Philippines and Japan.
