= Moelleriopsis nipponica =

Scientific classification
- Kingdom: Animalia
- Phylum: Mollusca
- Class: Gastropoda
- Subclass: Vetigastropoda
- Family: incertae sedis
- Genus: Moelleriopsis
- Species: M. nipponica

Binomial name
- Moelleriopsis nipponica (Okutani, 1964)

Synonyms
- Choristes nipponica Okutani, 1964

Species of gastropod

Moelleriopsis nipponica is a species of sea snail, a marine gastropod mollusk, unassigned in the superfamily Seguenzioidea.
