= Thaleia =

Scientific classification
- Kingdom: Animalia
- Phylum: Mollusca
- Class: Gastropoda
- Subclass: Caenogastropoda
- Order: Littorinimorpha
- Family: Eulimidae
- Genus: Thaleia; Warén, 1979

Type species
- Benthonella nisonis Dall, 1889

Genus of gastropods

Thaleia is a genus of very small ectoparasitic sea snails, marine gastropod mollusks or micromollusks in the Eulimidae family.

== Species ==
Species within the genera Thaleia include:

- Thaleia mucronetincta (Thiele, 1925)
- Thaleia nisonis (Dall, 1889)
