= Moelleriopsis watsoni =

Scientific classification
- Kingdom: Animalia
- Phylum: Mollusca
- Class: Gastropoda
- Subclass: Vetigastropoda
- Family: incertae sedis
- Genus: Moelleriopsis
- Species: M. watsoni

Binomial name
- Moelleriopsis watsoni (Tryon, 1888)

Synonyms
- Cyclostrema sulcatum R. B. Watson, 1886; Cyclostrema watsoni Tryon, 1888

Species of gastropod

Moelleriopsis watsoni is a species of sea snail, a marine gastropod mollusk, unassigned in the superfamily Seguenzioidea.
