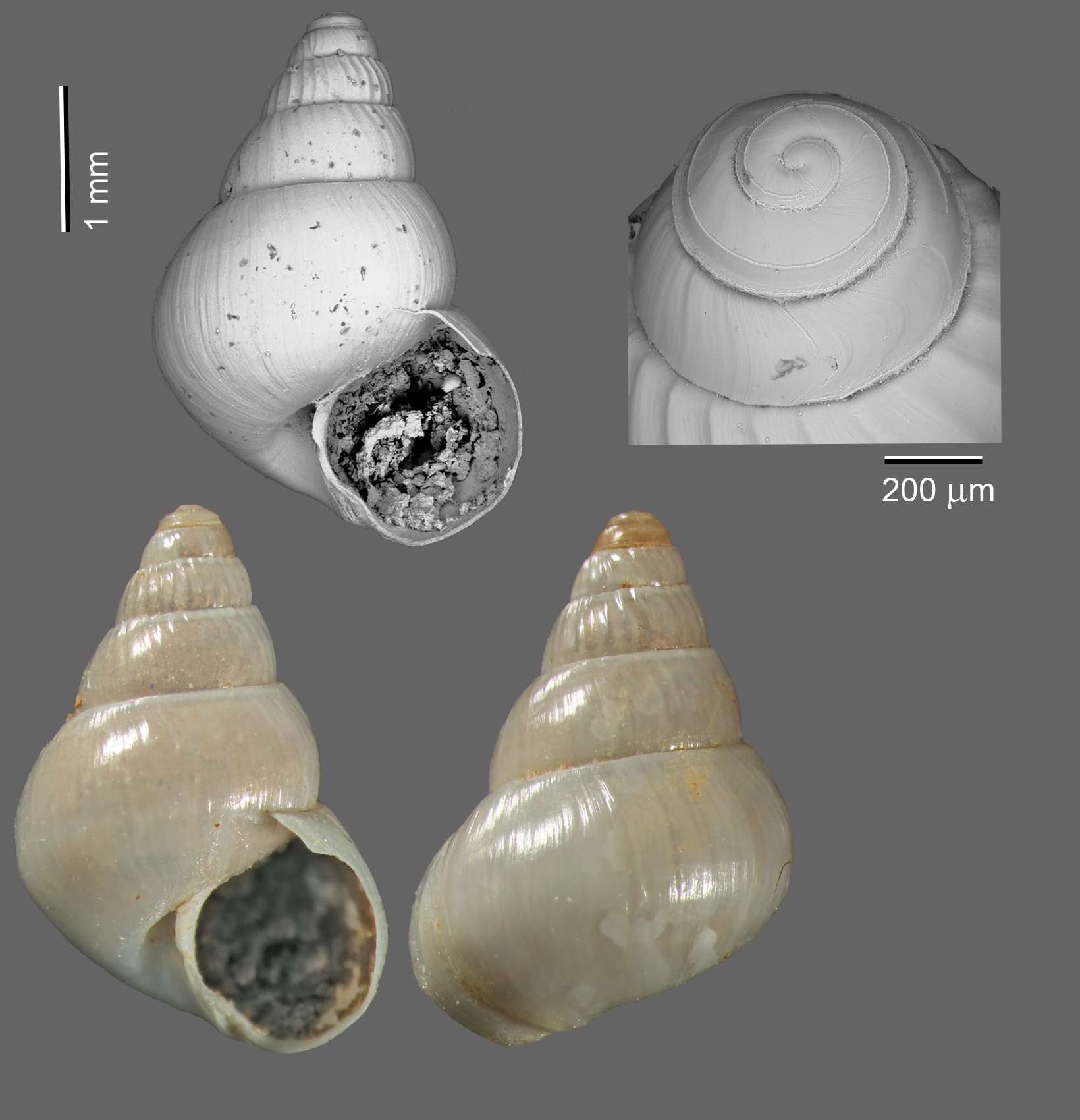
- hell of Benthonella tenella (specimen at MNHN, Paris)

Scientific classification
- Kingdom: Animalia
- Phylum: Mollusca
- Class: Gastropoda
- Subclass: Caenogastropoda
- Order: Littorinimorpha
- Family: Rissoidae
- Genus: Benthonella
- Species: B. tenella

Binomial name
- Benthonella tenella (Jeffreys, 1869)

Synonyms
- Assiminopsis abyssorum Locard, 1897; Benthonella fischeri Dall, 1889; Benthonella gaza Dall, 1889; Benthonella jeffreysi (Dautzenberg, 1889); Benthonella kullenbergi Odhner, 1960; Cithna jeffreysi (Dautzenberg, 1889); Cithna tenella (Jeffreys, 1869); Cithna tenella var. costulata Jeffreys, 1883; Lacuna abyssorum Locard, 1896; Lacuna tenella Jeffreys, 1869; Putilla abyssicola F. Nordsieck, 1972; Rissoa amblia var. inornata Dautzenberg, 1927

= Benthonella tenella =

Species of gastropod

Benthonella tenella is a species of small sea snail, a marine gastropod mollusk or micromollusk in the family Rissoidae.

== Distribution ==
This species occurs in the Atlantic Ocean off Southeast Brazil.

== Description ==
The maximum recorded shell length is 9 mm.

(Described as Benthonella gaza) The shell is elongated, glistening opaque white, and extremely thin, featuring two and a half larval whorls and five later whorls. The protoconch is trochiform, brown, and polished, with a single carina above the periphery. The other whorls are full and rounded, with the earlier ones marked with a few faint flexuous transverse waves, and the rest displaying only lines of growth. The whorls are full and rounded, and the suture is distinct. The base is full and rounded, with a small umbilicus, in front of which the thin inner lip is reflected. The aperture is rounded, and the lip is slightly reflected but not thickened.

== Habitat ==
Minimum recorded depth is 10 m. Maximum recorded depth is 5500 m.
