= Leotropa sarcina =

Scientific classification
- Kingdom: Animalia
- Phylum: Arthropoda
- Class: Insecta
- Order: Lepidoptera
- Family: Pyralidae
- Genus: Leotropa
- Species: L. sarcina

Binomial name
- Leotropa sarcina Hampson, 1918

Species of moth

Leotropa sarcina is a species of snout moth. It was described by George Hampson in 1918. It is found in East Africa.
