= Thaleia nisonis =

Scientific classification
- Kingdom: Animalia
- Phylum: Mollusca
- Class: Gastropoda
- Subclass: Caenogastropoda
- Order: Littorinimorpha
- Family: Eulimidae
- Genus: Thaleia
- Species: T. nisonis

Binomial name
- Thaleia nisonis (Dall, 1889)

Synonyms
- Benthonella nisonis Dall, 1889 (original combination)

Species of gastropod

Thaleia nisonis is a species of small, ectoparasitic sea snail, a marine gastropod mollusk or micromollusk in the family Eulimidae.

== Distribution ==
T. nisonis can be found in Atlantic waters, ranging from South Carolina to Brazil.

== Description ==
The maximum recorded shell length is 9 mm.

== Habitat ==
Minimum recorded depth is 50 m. Maximum recorded depth is 1930 m.
