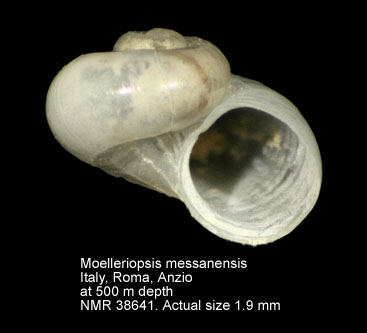

Scientific classification
- Kingdom: Animalia
- Phylum: Mollusca
- Class: Gastropoda
- Subclass: Vetigastropoda
- Family: incertae sedis
- Genus: Moelleriopsis
- Species: M. messanensis

Binomial name
- Moelleriopsis messanensis (Seguenza, 1876)

Synonyms
- Cyclostrema messanensis Seguenza, 1876 (original combination); Cyclostrema normanni Geronimo, I. Di & M. Bellagamba, 1986

= Moelleriopsis messanensis =

Species of gastropod

Moelleriopsis messanensis is a species of sea snail, a marine gastropod mollusk unassigned in the superfamily Seguenzioidea.

== Description ==
The length of the shell varies between 1.6 mm and 2.4 mm.

== Distribution ==
This species occurs in the Mediterranean Sea.
