= Retigyra iheringi =

Scientific classification
- Kingdom: Animalia
- Phylum: Mollusca
- Class: Gastropoda
- Subclass: Vetigastropoda
- Order: Trochida
- Family: Turbinidae
- Genus: Retigyra
- Species: R. iheringi

Binomial name
- Retigyra iheringi (Dautzenberg & H. Fischer, 1897)

Synonyms
- Cyclostrema iheringi Dautzenberg & H. Fischer, 1897

Species of gastropod

Retigyra iheringi is a species of sea snail, a marine gastropod mollusk, unassigned in the superfamily Seguenzioidea.

== Distribution ==
This species occurs in the Atlantic Ocean off the Azores.
