= Moelleriopsis normani =

Scientific classification
- Kingdom: Animalia
- Phylum: Mollusca
- Class: Gastropoda
- Subclass: Vetigastropoda
- Family: incertae sedis
- Genus: Moelleriopsis
- Species: M. normani

Binomial name
- Moelleriopsis normani (Dautzenberg & H. Fischer, 1897)

Synonyms
- Cyclostrema normani Dautzenberg & H. Fischer, 1897

Species of gastropod

Moelleriopsis normani is a species of sea snail, a marine gastropod mollusk unassigned in the superfamily Seguenzioidea.

== Distribution ==
This species occurs in the Atlantic Ocean off the Azores.
