= Moelleriopsis richardi =

Scientific classification
- Kingdom: Animalia
- Phylum: Mollusca
- Class: Gastropoda
- Subclass: Vetigastropoda
- Family: incertae sedis
- Genus: Moelleriopsis
- Species: M. richardi

Binomial name
- Moelleriopsis richardi (Dautzenberg & H. Fischer, 1896)

Synonyms
- Cyclostrema richardi Dautzenberg & H. Fischer, 1896

Species of gastropod

Moelleriopsis richardi is a species of sea snail, a marine gastropod mollusk unassigned in the superfamily Seguenzioidea.

== Distribution ==
This species occurs in the Atlantic Ocean at bathyal depths off the Azores.
