= Retigyra millipunctata =

Scientific classification
- Kingdom: Animalia
- Phylum: Mollusca
- Class: Gastropoda
- Subclass: Vetigastropoda
- Order: Trochida
- Family: Turbinidae
- Genus: Retigyra
- Species: R. millipunctata

Binomial name
- Retigyra millipunctata (Friele, 1886)

Synonyms
- Cyclostrema millipunctatum Friele 1886 (original combination)

Species of gastropod

Retigyra millipunctata is a species of sea snail, a marine gastropod mollusk, unassigned in the superfamily Seguenzioidea.

== Description ==
The shell grows to a height of 2 mm.

== Distribution ==
This marine species occurs off Greenland, Iceland and in the Rockall Trough.
