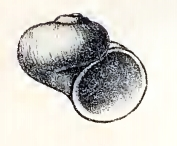
- Drawing of a shell of Skenea valvatoides

Scientific classification
- Kingdom: Animalia
- Phylum: Mollusca
- Class: Gastropoda
- Subclass: Vetigastropoda
- Order: Trochida
- Family: Skeneidae
- Genus: Skenea
- Species: S. valvatoides

Binomial name
- Skenea valvatoides (Jeffreys, 1883)

Synonyms
- Cyclostrema valvatoides Jeffreys, 1883 (original combination); Moelleriopsis valvatoides (Jeffreys, 1883)

= Skenea valvatoides =

Species of gastropod

Skenea valvatoides is a species of small sea snail, a marine gastropod mollusk in the family Skeneidae.

== Description ==
The diameter of the shell attains 3.1 mm. The rather solid, yellowish white shell is narrowly umbilicated. it is opaque, glossy, with a few irregular growth lines. The spire has a rather flattened apex. The suture is deep. The four whorls are well-rounded. The peristome is considerably expanded.

== Distribution ==
This species occurs in the Atlantic Ocean at bathyal depths off Portugal.
