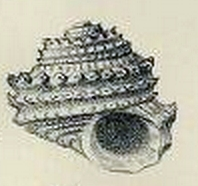
- Liotia echinacantha shell

Scientific classification
- Kingdom: Animalia
- Phylum: Mollusca
- Class: Gastropoda
- Subclass: Vetigastropoda
- Order: Trochida
- Superfamily: Trochoidea
- Family: Liotiidae; Gray, 1850

Synonyms
- Cyclostrematidae P. Fischer, 1885

= Liotiidae =

Family of gastropods

Liotiidae is a family of small sea snails, marine gastropod mollusks in the clade Vetigastropoda (according to the taxonomy of the Gastropoda by Bouchet & Rocroi, 2005).

== Description ==
The head of the animal is proboscidiform. The epipodial line has a pair of conical lobes and three pairs of cirri.

The white shell has a turbiniform or discoidal shape. It shows longitudinal ribs or is clathrate. The shell shows a fine lamellar sculpture. The circular aperture is feebly nacreous. The thick peristome is continuous and shows a callous varix. The multispiral operculum is hispid, corneous and has a soft, calcareous outer layer (intritacalx) formed of pearly beads that are disposed spirally.

== Taxonomy ==
=== 2005 taxonomy ===
The family Liotiidae belongs to the superfamily Turbinoidea, according to the taxonomy of the Gastropoda by Bouchet & Rocroi, 2005).

This family consists of the three following subfamilies (according to the taxonomy of the Gastropoda by Bouchet & Rocroi, 2005):

- Liotiinae Gray, 1850 - synonym: Cyclostrematidae P. Fischer, 1885; McLean (1987) ranked it as subfamily of Turbinidae.
- † Brochidiinae Yochelson, 1956
- † Dichostasiinae Yochelson, 1956

=== 2008 taxonomy ===
Liotiidae was moved to the redefined superfamily Trochoidea according to Williams et al. (2008).

== Genera ==
Genera in this family include:

subfamily Liotiinae

- Austroliotia Cotton, 1948
- Bathyliotina Habe, 1961
- Circumstella Laseron, 1958
- Cithna A. Adams, 1863
- Cordarene S.-I Huang, C.-L. Chen & M.-H. Lin, 2018
- Cyclostrema Marryat, 1818
- Dentarene Iredale, 1929
- † Klebyella Gründel, 1998
- Liotia Gray, 1842 - type genus
- Liotina Munier-Chalmas, 1885
- Macrarene Hertlein & Strong, 1951
- Moniliotina S.-I Huang, M.-H. Lin & C.-L. Chen, 2019
- Munditia Finlay, 1926
- Pterarene Sakurai & Habe, 1977
- Rhodinoliotia Tomlin & Shackleford, 1915
- Rufanula Barnard, 1963

subfamily † Dichostasiinae

- † Dichostasia Yochelson, 1956 - type genus of the subfamily Dichostasiinae

Not in a subfamily

- †Pareuchelus O. Boettger, 1907
- Rotaliotina S.-I Huang, 2023

Genera brought into synonymy

- Conicella Laseron, 1954: synonym of Wanganella Laseron, 1954
- Liochrysta Laseron, 1958: synonym of Pseudoliotia Tate, 1898
