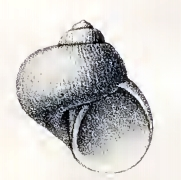
- Drawing with an apertural view of a shell of Ganesa nitidiuscula

Scientific classification
- Kingdom: Animalia
- Phylum: Mollusca
- Class: Gastropoda
- Subclass: Vetigastropoda
- Order: Trochida
- Family: Skeneidae
- Genus: Ganesa; Jeffreys, 1883

Type species
- Ganesa nitidiuscula Jeffreys, J.G., 1883

= Ganesa (gastropod) =

Genus of gastropods

Ganesa is a genus of sea snails, marine gastropod mollusks in the family Skeneidae.

== Species ==
Species within the genus Ganesa include:

- Ganesa nitidiuscula Jeffreys, 1883
- Ganesa panamensis Dall, 1902

Species brought into synonymy

- Ganesa abyssicola Bush, 1897: synonym of Lissospira abyssicola Bush, 1897
- Ganesa bujnitzkii (Gorbunov, 1946): synonym of Lissospira bujnitzkii (Gorbunov, 1946)
- Ganesa bushae Dall, 1927: synonym of Lissospira bushae (Dall, 1927)
- Ganesa conica Dall, 1927: synonym of Lissospira conica (Dall, 1927)
- Ganesa convexa (Bush, 1897): synonym of Lissospira convexa Bush, 1897
- Ganesa dalli A. E. Verrill, 1882: synonym of Lissospira dalli (A. E. Verrill, 1882)
- Ganesa depressa Dall, 1927: synonym of Lissospira depressa (Dall, 1927)
- Ganesa diaphana A. E. Verrill, 1884: synonym of Skenea diaphana (A. E. Verrill, 1884)
- Ganesa laevigata (Friele, 1876): synonym of Skenea trochoides (Friele, 1876)
- Ganesa limata Dall, 1889: synonym of Granigyra limata (Dall, 1889)
- Ganesa ornata A. E. Verrill, 1884: synonym of Lissospira ornata (A. E. Verrill, 1884)
- Ganesa proxima Tryon, 1888: synonym of Skenea proxima (Tryon, 1888)
- Ganesa radiata Dall, 1927: synonym of Granigyra radiata Dall, 1927
- Ganesa rarinota Bush, 1897: synonym of Lissospira rarinota Bush, 1897
- Ganesa spinulosa Bush, 1897: synonym of Granigyra spinulosa Bush, 1897
- Ganesa striata Bush, 1897: synonym of Lissospira striata Bush, 1897
- Ganesa valvata Dall, 1927: synonym of Lissospira valvata (Dall, 1927)
- Ganesa verrilli Tryon, 1888: synonym of Rugulina verrilli (Tryon, 1888)
