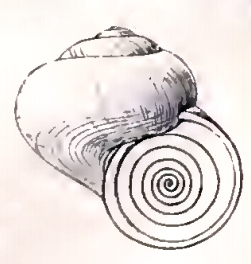

Scientific classification
- Kingdom: Animalia
- Phylum: Mollusca
- Class: Gastropoda
- Subclass: Vetigastropoda
- Order: Trochida
- Family: Skeneidae
- Genus: Lissospira; Bush, 1897

Type species
- Cyclostrema proxima Tryon, 1888

= Lissospira =

Genus of gastropods

Lissospira is a genus of sea snails, marine gastropod mollusks in the family Skeneidae.

== Description ==
This genus was proposed for a group of deepwater species which had been erroneously referred to Cyclostrema.

They are small, thin, of rather delicate texture (with the exception of Lissospira rarinota), opaque white, and slightly lustrous. Their shell consists of few convex whorls forming an elevated spire, with a relatively large, prominent nuclear whorl and a large body whorl. The suture is deep. The umbilicus is small, deep, and does not show any whorls. The aperture is somewhat oblique, circular with a slight sutural angle, and not modified by the body whorl to which the simple, continuous peritreme is but slightly attached. The aperture often has an indistinct thread just within the inner lip, fading out above and below, so that it extends but about halfway round the aperture. It is much nearer the edge along the columellar margin than at the ends and is evidently to prevent the thin operculum being drawn in too far. The operculum is circular, thin, of a delicate horn color, with a central nucleus. It has about seven whorls, defined by a distinct spiral thread, often showing delicate, microscopic transverse growth lines. The radula consists of numerous rows of delicate teeth. Each row hasone broad central, or median tooth, with a broad, blunt, delicately serrate, curved tip and on either side four more slender lateral teeth also with blunt, curved, delicately serrate tips, beyond which is a series of numerous, between 30 and 50, long, very slender, somewhat sickle-shaped hooks sometimes with delicately serrate tips.

== Species ==
Species within the genus Lissospira include:

- Lissospira abyssicola Bush, 1897
- Lissospira bushae (Dall, 1927)
- Lissospira chalossensis Lozouet, 1999
- Lissospira conica (Dall, 1927)
- Lissospira convexa Bush, 1897
- Lissospira dalli (A. E. Verrill, 1882)
- Lissospira depressa (Dall, 1927)
- Lissospira grata Thiele, 1925
- Lissospira larva Lozouet, 1999
- Lissospira ornata (A. E. Verrill, 1884)
- Lissospira proxima Tryon, 1888
- Lissospira rarinota Bush, 1897
- Lissospira striata Bush, 1897
- Lissospira valvata (Dall, 1927)

Species brought into synonymy

- Lissospira basistriata (Jeffreys, J.G., 1877): synonym of Skenea basistriata (Jeffreys, J.G., 1877)
- Lissospira bithynoides (Jeffreys, 1883): synonym of Lissomphalia bithynoides (Monterosato, 1880)
- Lissospira bujnitzkii (Gorbunov, 1946): synonym of Leptogyra bujnitzkii (Gorbunov, 1946) (new combination)
- Lissospira ossiansarsi Warén, A., 1991: synonym of Skenea ossiansarsi Warén, 1991
- Lissospira profunda (Friele, 1879): synonym of Skenea profunda (Friele, 1879)
- Lissospira turgida (Odhner, 1912): synonym of Skenea turgida (Odhner, 1912)
