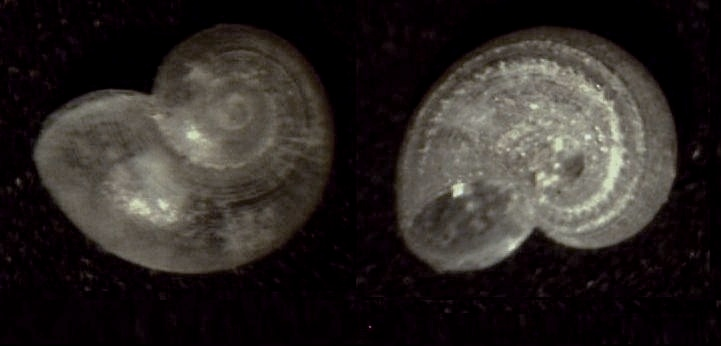
- Different views of a shell of Skenea catenoides

Scientific classification
- Kingdom: Animalia
- Phylum: Mollusca
- Class: Gastropoda
- Subclass: Vetigastropoda
- Order: Trochida
- Family: Skeneidae
- Genus: Skenea; Fleming, 1824

Type species
- Helix serpuloides Montagu, 1808

Synonyms
- Delphinoidea T. Brown, 1827

= Skenea =

Genus of gastropods

Skenea is a genus of small to minute sea snails, marine gastropod mollusks in the family Skeneidae.

This genus is type genus for the family Skeneidae. It has been used as a general receptacle for species that are probably unrelated to the type species Helix serpuloides Montagu, 1808, such as Skenea divae Carrozza & Van Aartsen, 2001 and Skenea nilarum Engl, 1996.

== Species ==
Species within the genus Skenea include:

- Skenea areolata (Sars, 1878)
- Skenea basicarinata Hoffman, Gofas & Freiwald, 2020
- Skenea basistriata (Jeffreys, 1877)
- Skenea californica (Bartsch, 1907)
- Skenea carmelensis Smith & Gordon, 1948
- Skenea catenoides (Monterosato, 1877)
- Skenea concordia (Bartsch, 1920)
- Skenea coronadoensis (Arnold, 1903)
- Skenea costulata Sbrana & Siracusa, 2018
- † Skenea crassa Lozouet, 1999
- † Skenea dautzenbergi (Glibert, 1949)
- Skenea diaphana (A. E. Verrill, 1884)
- Skenea divae Carrozza & van Aartsen, 2001
- Skenea ferruginea Warén, 1991
- Skenea giemellorum Romani, Bogi & Bartolini, 2015
- Skenea inclinans (Barnard, 1963)
- † Skenea indubitabilis Lozouet, 1999
- Skenea larseni Warén, 1993
- † Skenea minuticostata Landau, Van Dingenen & Ceulemans, 2017
- † Skenea multicostellata Lozouet, 1999
- Skenea nilarum Engl, 1996
- Skenea olgae Segers, Swinnen & De Prins, 2009
- Skenea ossiansarsi Warén, 1991
- Skenea pelagia Nofroni & Valenti, 1987
- Skenea peterseni (Friele, 1877)
- Skenea polita Warén, 1993
- Skenea ponsonbyi (Dautzenberg & H. Fischer, 1897)
- Skenea profunda Friele, 1879
- Skenea proxima (Tryon, 1888)
- Skenea rugulosa (Sars, 1878)
- † Skenea saga Lozouet, 1999
- † Skenea sanctistephani Lozouet, 1999
- Skenea serpuloides (Montagu, 1808)
- † Skenea subauriculata Lozouet, 1998
- Skenea trochoides (Friele, 1876)
- Skenea turgida (Odhner, 1912)
- Skenea valvatoides (Jeffreys, 1883)
- Skenea victori Segers, Swinnen & De Prins, 2009
- † Skenea wareni Landau, Van Dingenen & Ceulemans, 2017
- †Skenea wesselinghi D. F. Hoeksema & Simons, 2020

Species brought into synonymy

- Skenea alderi Jeffreys, J.G., 1865: synonym of Dikoleps nitens (Philippi, 1844)
- Skenea bujnitzkii (Gorbunov, 1946): synonym of Lissospira bujnitzkii (Gorbunov, 1946)
- Skenea cornuella A. Adams, 1860: synonym of Tubiola cornuella (A. Adams, 1860)
- Skenea cutleriana Clark, 1849: synonym of Dikoleps cutleriana (Clark, 1848)
- Skenea divisa Forbes & Hanley 1853: synonym of Skenea serpuloides (Montagu, 1808)
- Skenea exilissima (Philippi 1844): synonym of Skeneoides exilissima (Philippi 1844)
- Skenea forbesi Nordsieck 1982: synonym of Dikoleps nitens (Philippi, 1844)
- Skenea gouldii Philippi, 1853: synonym of Skeneopsis planorbis (Fabricius, 1780)
- Skenea helicina Monterosato 1874: synonym of Xenoskenea pellucida (Monterosato 1874)
- Skenea hyalina Jeffreys, 1867: synonym of Skeneopsis planorbis (Fabricius, 1780)
- Skenea laevigata Jeffreys, 1876: synonym of Skenea trochoides (Friele, 1876)
- Skenea laevis Forbes & Hanley 1856: synonym of Dikoleps nitens (Philippi 1844)
- Skenea liratus A. E. Verrill, 1882: synonym of Circulus liratus (A. E. Verrill, 1882)
- Skenea maculata Jeffreys, 1867: synonym of Skeneopsis planorbis (Fabricius, 1780)
- Skenea mutabilis Costa, O.G., 1861: synonym of Dikoleps nitens (Philippi, 1844)
- Skenea nitens (Philippi, 1844): synonym of Dikoleps pusilla (Jeffreys, 1847)
- Skenea nitidissima Forbes & Hanley 1853: synonym of Omalogyra atomus (Philippi 1841)
- Skenea pellucida Monterosato 1874: synonym of Xenoskenea pellucida (Monterosato 1874)
- Skenea pellucidoides Nordsieck 1982: synonym of Xenoskenea pellucida (Monterosato 1874)
- Skenea petitii P. Fischer, 1857: synonym of Solariorbis petitii (P. Fischer, 1857)
- Skenea planorbis Fabricius, 1780: synonym of Skeneopsis planorbis (Fabricius, 1780)
- Skenea rota Forbes & Hanley, 1850: synonym of Ammonicera rota (Forbes & Hanley, 1850)
- Skenea serpuloides auct. non Montagu, 1808: synonym of Skeneopsis planorbis (Fabricius, 1780)
- Skenea subcanaliculata E.A. Smith, 1875: synonym of Microdiscula subcanaliculata (E.A. Smith, 1875)
- Skenea sulcata Simpson, 1887: synonym of Cyclostremiscus beauii (P. Fischer, 1857)
- Skenea tricarinata Webster, 1856: synonym of Ammonicera rota (Forbes & Hanley, 1850)
- Skenea trilix Bush, 1885: synonym of Cyclostremiscus trilix (Bush, 1885)
- Skenea trochiformis Jeffreys, 1867: synonym of Skeneopsis planorbis (Fabricius, 1780)
