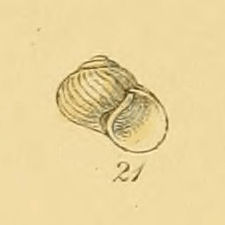
- Moelleria costulata shell

Scientific classification
- Kingdom: Animalia
- Phylum: Mollusca
- Class: Gastropoda
- Subclass: Vetigastropoda
- Order: Trochida
- Family: Colloniidae
- Subfamily: Moelleriinae
- Genus: Moelleria; Jeffreys, 1865

= Moelleria =

Genus of gastropods

Moelleria is a genus of sea snails, marine gastropod mollusks in the family Colloniidae.

== Species ==
Species within the genus Moelleria include:

- Moelleria costulata (Møller, 1842)
- Moelleria jansseni D. F. Hoeksema, Rijken & Simons, 2020 †

Species brought into synonymy

- Moelleria drusiana Dall, 1919: synonym of Spiromoelleria quadrae (Dall, 1897)
- Moelleria laevigata Friele, 1876: synonym of Skenea trochoides (Friele, 1876)
- Moelleria quadrae Dall, 1997: synonym of Spiromoelleria quadrae (Dall, 1897)
