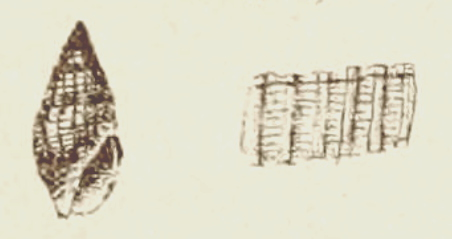
- Original image of a shell of Vexillum aethiopicum

Scientific classification
- Kingdom: Animalia
- Phylum: Mollusca
- Class: Gastropoda
- Subclass: Caenogastropoda
- Order: Neogastropoda
- Superfamily: Turbinelloidea
- Family: Costellariidae
- Genus: Vexillum
- Species: V. aethiopicum

Binomial name
- Vexillum aethiopicum (Jickeli, 1874)

Synonyms
- Turricula (Costellaria) aethiopica Jickeli, 1874; Vexillum (Pusia) aethiopica (Jickeli, 1874)

= Vexillum aethiopicum =

Species of gastropod

Vexillum aethiopicum is a species of sea snail, a marine gastropod mollusk, in the family Costellariidae, the ribbed miters.

== Description ==
The length of the shell attains 4 mm.

The minute, fusiform, solid shell is black. The perpendicular ribs are impressed with spiral lines with the spirals being a little elongated with a sharp tip. The shell consists of six slightly convex whorls. The suture is barely separated obliquely. The body whorl measures half the length of the shell. The base of the shell is attenuated. The oval aperture barely recedes to the base. It is inside black-purplish. The outer lip is regularly curved. The columella contains three plaits.

The spiral lines cut deeply into the interstices of the longitudinal ribs (24 on the body whorl), while they are quite weak on the ribs themselves. Only at the edge they dig deeper and so, although still somewhat indistinct, they make a series of knots. They result in clear spiral belts at the base of the shell.

The American malacologist Tryon called this shell "A miserable little young shell, the description of which is of advantage to Mr. Jickeli, perhaps."

== Distribution ==
This marine species occurs off Eritrea.
