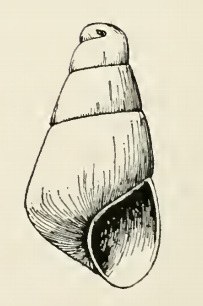
- Apertural view of a shell of Odostomia mammillata

Scientific classification
- Kingdom: Animalia
- Phylum: Mollusca
- Class: Gastropoda
- Family: Pyramidellidae
- Genus: Odostomia
- Species: O. mammillata

Binomial name
- Odostomia mammillata Carpenter, 1856

= Odostomia mammillata =

Species of gastropod

Odostomia mammillata is a species of sea snail, a marine gastropod mollusc in the family Pyramidellidae, the pyrams and their allies.

This species has been reported by G.W. Tryon as Odostomia mamillata Carp. in his book Manual of Conchology vol. VII, page 359 (1889).

== Description ==
The ovate, milk-white shell lacks axial or spiral sculpture excepting microscopic growth lines. The length of the shell is 1.1 mm. The whorls are flattened. The whorls of the protoconch are large, oblique and two-thirds immersed in the first of the succeeding turns. The whorls of the teleoconch are decidedly flattened, smooth and rather high between the sutures. The sutures are well impressed. The periphery is marked by a slender, raised cord, which renders it angulated. The base of the shell is rather short and slightly inflated immediately below the umbilical area. The aperture is broadly oval. The posterior angle is acute. The outer lip is thin and angulated at the periphery. The columella is short, slender, strongly curved and slightly reflected. The parietal wall is covered by a strong callus.
