= Anachis adelinae =

Scientific classification
- Kingdom: Animalia
- Phylum: Mollusca
- Class: Gastropoda
- Subclass: Caenogastropoda
- Order: Neogastropoda
- Family: Columbellidae
- Genus: Anachis
- Species: A. adelinae

Binomial name
- Anachis adelinae (Tryon, 1883)

Synonyms
- Columbella adelinae Tryon, 1883 (original combination)

Species of gastropod

Anachis adelinae is a species of sea snail in the family Columbellidae, the dove snails.

== Distribution ==
This species occurs in the Gulf of California off Mexico.
