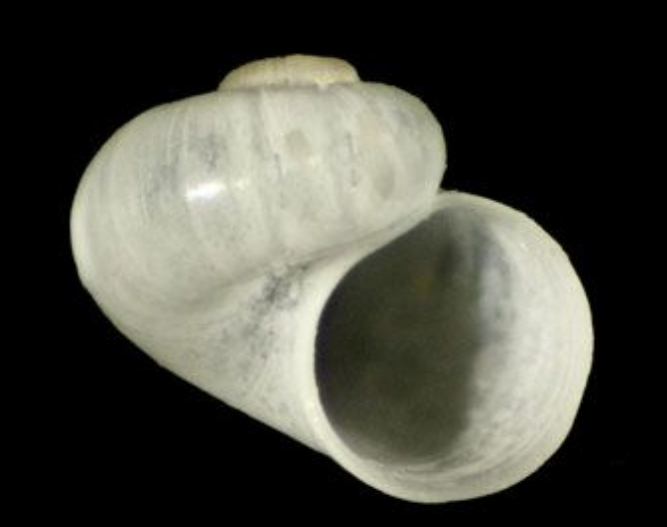
- Shell of Akritogyra conspicua (specimen at the Natural History Museum Rotterdam)

Scientific classification
- Kingdom: Animalia
- Phylum: Mollusca
- Class: Gastropoda
- Subclass: Vetigastropoda
- Genus: Akritogyra
- Species: A. conspicua

Binomial name
- Akritogyra conspicua (Monterosato, 1880)
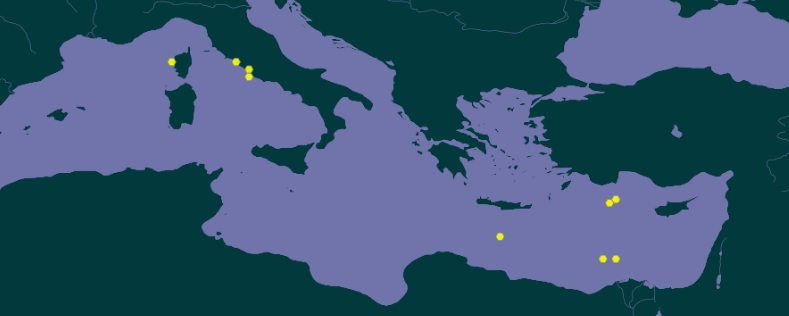

Synonyms
- Cyclostrema conspicuum Monterosato, 1880 (original combination); Cyclostrema valvatoides Di Geronimo & Bellagamba 1986; Tubiola (Tubiola) conspicua Schirò 1971

= Akritogyra conspicua =

Species of gastropod

Akritogyra conspicua is a species of sea snail, a marine gastropod mollusk, unassigned in the superfamily Seguenzioidea.

== Description ==
The size of the shell varies between 1.3 mm and 2 mm; average diameter 1.4 mm.

(Original description in Italian by Monterosato) This species is similar in shape and size to Cyclostrema basistriatum Jeffreys, 1877 (synonym of Skenea basistriata (Jeffreys, 1877) ) which is Norwegian, but the shell is completely smooth instead of striated and with deeper suture.

== Distribution ==
This species occurs in deep waters in Central and Western Mediterranean Sea, at depths between 100 m and 2400 m.
