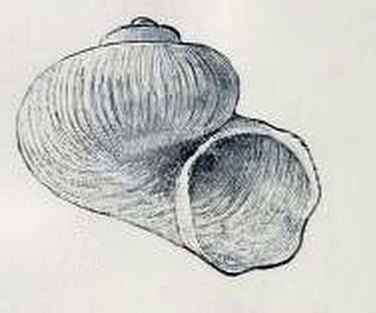
- Original drawing of a shell of Dikoleps pruinosa

Scientific classification
- Kingdom: Animalia
- Phylum: Mollusca
- Class: Gastropoda
- Subclass: Vetigastropoda
- Order: Trochida
- Family: Skeneidae
- Genus: Dikoleps
- Species: D. pruinosa

Binomial name
- Dikoleps pruinosa (Chaster, 1896)

Synonyms
- Cyclostrema pruinosum Chaster 1896

= Dikoleps pruinosa =

Species of gastropod

Dikoleps pruinosa is a minute species of sea snail, a marine gastropod mollusk in the family Skeneidae.

== Description ==
(Original description by Chaster) The height of the shell attains 1 mm, its diameter 0.6 mm. The shell has a subglobose shape. It is whitish in colour, dull and frosted in appearance, owing to the entire surface being covered with very numerous, fine, close -set, flexuous striae following the direction of the lines of growth. On the umbilical area and adjoining part of the base there are also numerous, much stronger spiral lines, finely granulated by the striae just described. The 2½ whorls are convex. The suture is very distinct though not deep. The spire is a little raised. The aperture is nearly circular. The outer lip is thin, presenting two shallow sinuations, one at the periphery and one below. The umbilicus is rather large. The operculum like that of Dikoleps nitens.

== Distribution ==
This species occurs in the Mediterranean Sea.
