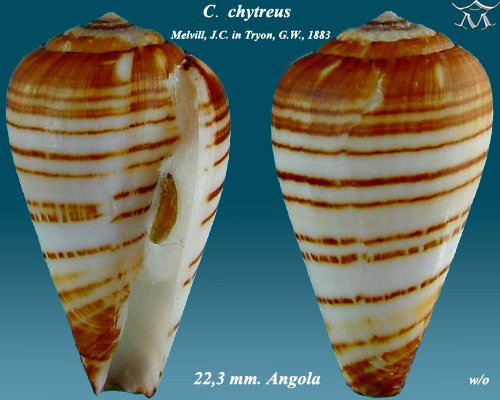
- Apertural and abapertural views of shell of Conus chytreus Melvill, J.C. in Tryon, G.W., 1883

Conservation status
- Least Concern (IUCN 3.1)

Scientific classification
- Kingdom: Animalia
- Phylum: Mollusca
- Class: Gastropoda
- Subclass: Caenogastropoda
- Order: Neogastropoda
- Superfamily: Conoidea
- Family: Conidae
- Genus: Conus
- Species: C. chytreus

Binomial name
- Conus chytreus Tryon, 1884

Synonyms
- Conus (Lautoconus) chytreus Tryon, 1884 · accepted, alternate representation; Conus figulinus var. chytreus Tryon, 1884 (original name); Conus lucirensis Paes Da Franca, 1957; Varioconus chytreus (Tryon, 1884); Varioconus lucirensis Paes da Franca, M.L., 1957

= Conus chytreus =

Species of sea snail

Conus chytreus is a species of sea snail, a marine gastropod mollusk in the family Conidae, the cone snails and their allies.

Like all species within the genus Conus, these snails are predatory and venomous. They are capable of stinging humans, therefore live ones should be handled carefully or not at all.

== Description ==
The shell has a wide variation in size, going from roughly 16 mm to 32 mm in diameter** depending on the specific mollusk and its age.

== Distribution ==
This species occurs in the Atlantic Ocean off Angola.
