= Ganesa panamensis =

Scientific classification
- Kingdom: Animalia
- Phylum: Mollusca
- Class: Gastropoda
- Subclass: Vetigastropoda
- Order: Trochida
- Family: Skeneidae
- Genus: Ganesa
- Species: G. panamensis

Binomial name
- Ganesa panamensis Dall, 1902

Species of gastropod

Ganesa panamensis is a species of sea snail, a marine gastropod mollusk in the family Skeneidae.

== Notes ==
Additional information regarding this species:

- Taxonomy: this may be a species of Dillwynella, according to Kunze (2011).

W.H. Dall was somewhat puzzled where to place this little shell, which appears to agree in general form very well with Ganesa nitidiuscula Jeffreys, as figured in the Proceedings of the Zoological Society of London for 1883. For the present, Dall referred this species to Ganesa provisionally.

== Description ==
The height of the shell attains 4.5 mm, its diameter 4.75 mm. The shell is rather large for the genus, evenly, roundly turbinate. The nucleus is lost. The shell contains about two and a half subsequent inflated whorls. The suture is distinct. The whorl in front of it narrowly marginate. The polished surface of the shell is smooth, except for fine incremental lines. It shows about ten faint grooves around the very narrowly perforate umbilicus. The simple aperture is rounded. The outer lip is sharp, the inner arcuate and slightly thickened, the body with a thin callus. The operculum has a pale horn color and contains about five whorls.

The foot of the animal is rather short, with several pseudopodial lateral rather stout filaments.

== Distribution ==
This species occurs in the Gulf of Panama.
