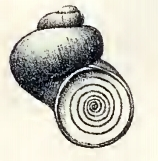
- Drawing of a shell of Lissospira proxima

Scientific classification
- Kingdom: Animalia
- Phylum: Mollusca
- Class: Gastropoda
- Subclass: Vetigastropoda
- Order: Trochida
- Family: Skeneidae
- Genus: Lissospira
- Species: L. proxima

Binomial name
- Lissospira proxima (Tryon, 1888)

Synonyms
- Cyclostrema affine A. E. Verrill, 1884; Cyclostrema proximum Tryon, 1888; Cyclostrema (Tubiola) proxima Tryon, 1888; Ganesa proxima Tryon, 1888; Lissospira proxima Tryon, 1888

= Lissospira proxima =

Species of gastropod

Lissospira proxima is a species of sea snail, a marine gastropod mollusk in the family Skeneidae.

The name Cyclostrema proxima was introduced by G.W. Tryon as a replacement name for Cyclostrema affine Verrill, 1884 (now recognized as a synonym of Skenea basistriata (Jeffreys, 1877)), while he thought it was closely related to Cyclostrema basistriata Brugnone. Anders Warén thought it would probably prove a synonym of Skenea diaphana. W.H. Dall thought it a synonym of Skenea trochoides.

== Description ==
The size of the shell attains 2.2 mm. The shell is narrowly umbilicated, faintly striate, with a few indistinct spiral lines below the suture, and numerous well defined ones on the base. Around the umbilicus the inferior striae become stronger. The surface of the shell is smooth and greyish white. The suture is impressed. The whorls are very convex and rapidly increasing. The thin periphery is round and slightly in contact.

== Distribution ==
This species occurs in the Atlantic Ocean off New England and North Carolina, US, at depths between 538 m and 1542 m.
