= Lissospira bushae =

Scientific classification
- Kingdom: Animalia
- Phylum: Mollusca
- Class: Gastropoda
- Subclass: Vetigastropoda
- Order: Trochida
- Family: Skeneidae
- Genus: Lissospira
- Species: L. bushae

Binomial name
- Lissospira bushae (Dall, 1927)

Synonyms
- Ganesa bushae Dall, 1927; Ganesa (Lissospira) bushae Dall, 1927

Species of gastropod

Lissospira bushae is a species of sea snail, a marine gastropod mollusk in the family Skeneidae,

== Description ==
The size of the shell attains 3.3 mm, its diameter 2.7 mm.

(Original description) The shell resembles Lissospira proxima Tryon, 1888 but it is larger and features a less elevated spire. It comprises nearly four white, well-rounded, smooth, and polished whorls. A well-marked but not deep suture is present.

The shell has a perforate umbilicus with no spiral striations around it. The base is convex.

The aperture is nearly circular, and the lips are united over the body by a thin layer of enamel. The margins are thin and entire. The inner lip lies close to but is not reflected over the umbilicus.

== Distribution ==
This species occurs in the Atlantic Ocean off Georgia, United States, at a depth of 538 m.
