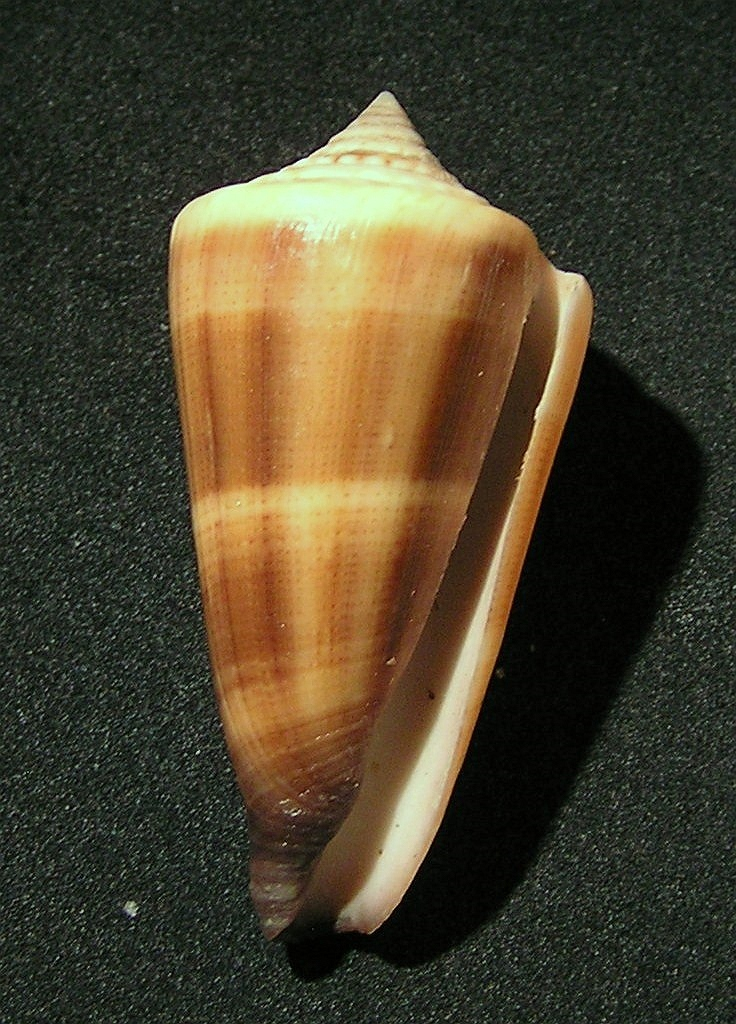
- Apertural view of a shell of Conus furvus

Conservation status
- Least Concern (IUCN 3.1)

Scientific classification
- Kingdom: Animalia
- Phylum: Mollusca
- Class: Gastropoda
- Subclass: Caenogastropoda
- Order: Neogastropoda
- Superfamily: Conoidea
- Family: Conidae
- Genus: Conus
- Species: C. furvus

Binomial name
- Conus furvus Reeve, 1843

Synonyms
- Calibanus furvus (Reeve, 1843); Conus (Calibanus) furvus Reeve, 1843 accepted, alternate representation; Conus aegrotus Reeve, 1849; Conus albicans G. B. Sowerby II, 1857; Conus albus G. B. Sowerby III, 1887; Conus buxeus Reeve, 1844 (invalid: junior homonym of Conus buxeus Röding, 1798; C. neobuxeus da Motta, 1991, is a replacement name); Conus cecilei Kiener, 1845; Conus crepusculum Reeve, 1844; Conus granifer Reeve, 1849; Conus lignarius Reeve, 1843; Conus multilineatus G. B. Sowerby III, 1875 (invalid: junior homonym of Conus multilineatus Pecchioli, 1864; Conus polygrammus is a replacement name); Conus neobuxeus da Motta, 1991; Conus nivalis da Motta, 1985; Conus polygrammus Tomlin, 1937; Conus turritinus da Motta, 1985

= Conus furvus =

Species of sea snail

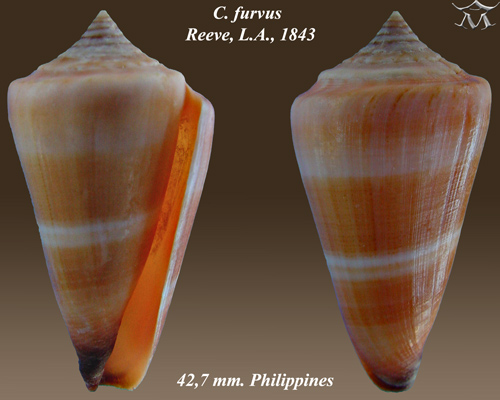
Conus furvus Reeve, L.A., 1843

Conus furvus, common name the dark cone, is a species of predatory sea snail, a marine gastropod mollusk in the family Conidae, the cone snails, cone shells or cones.

== Description ==
The size of an adult shell varies between 30 mm and 71 mm. The ground color of the shell is pale brown, with fine close lines of chestnut-brown, and one or two paler bands. The shoulder ( = the angulation of the shell whorls) is somewhat obtuse. The spire is concavely elevated, with an acute apex. The spire is uniform pale brown. Tryon describes the variety furvus with this special characteristics. The revolving lines are broken up into minute dots The form is somewhat narrower. Some of the spire whorls are finely beaded.

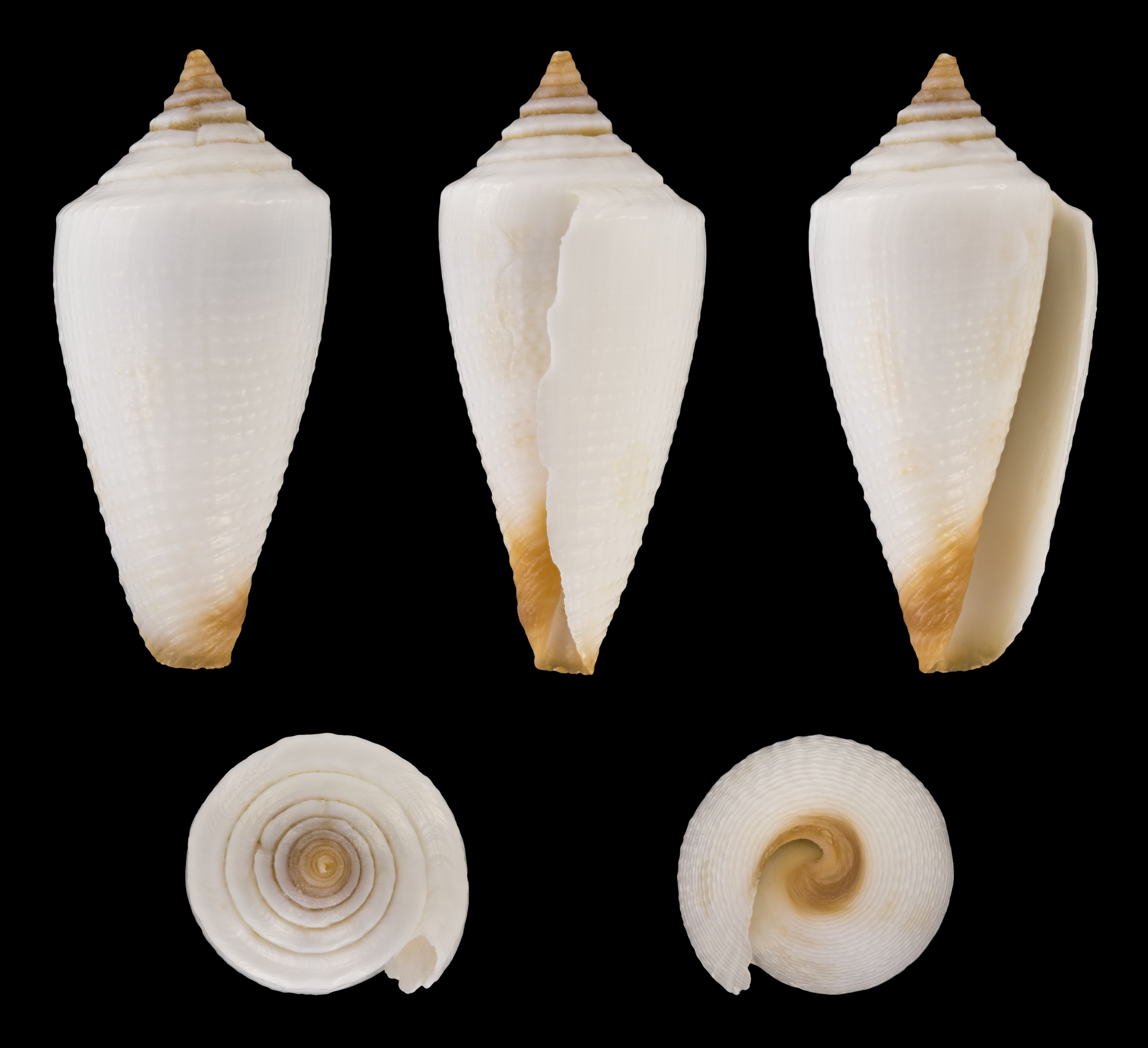
forma aegrotus

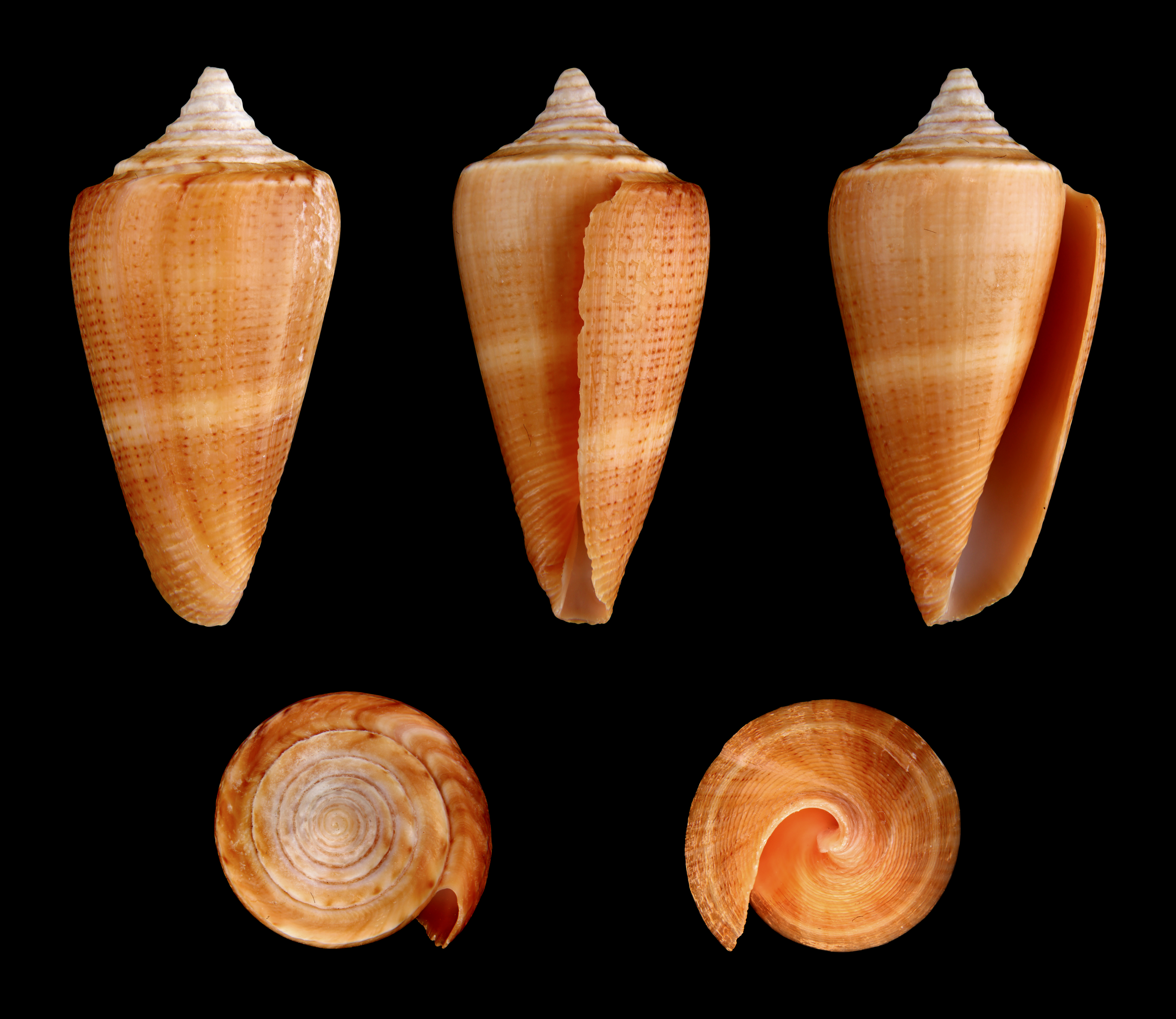
forma lignarius

== Distribution ==
This is an Indo-Pacific species. The type locality is Port Sacloban, Leyte Island in the Philippines. The species occurs along the Andaman Islands, Malaysia, Indonesia, Papua New Guinea and from the Philippines to Japan. It is also found in the South China Sea.

== Gallery ==
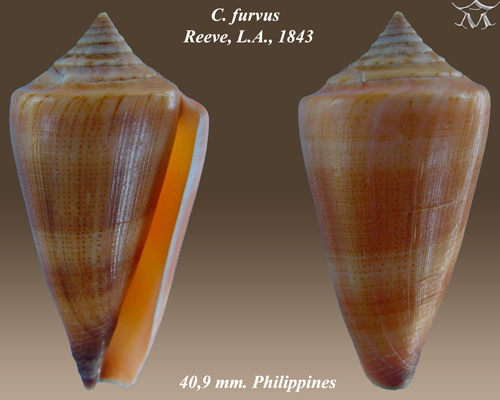
Conus furvus Reeve, L.A., 1843

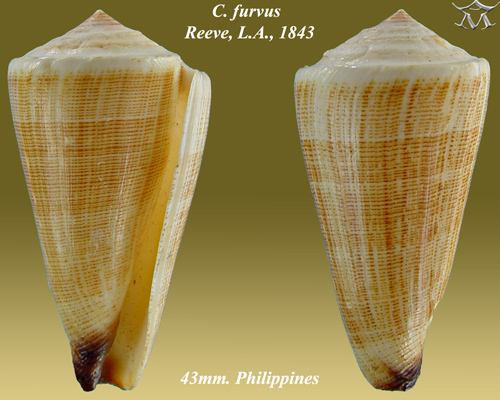
Conus furvus Reeve, L.A., 1843

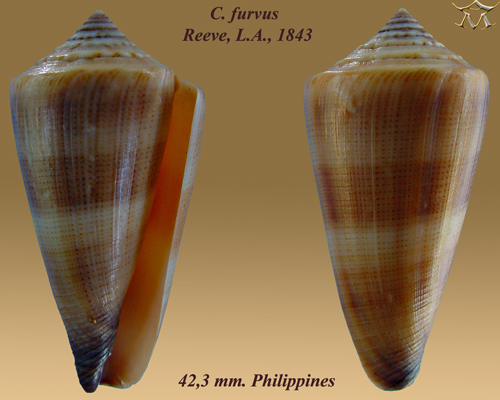
Conus furvus Reeve, L.A., 1843

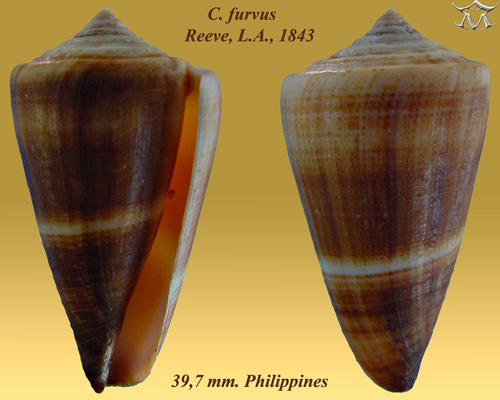
Conus furvus Reeve, L.A., 1843
