= Skenea carmelensis =

Scientific classification
- Kingdom: Animalia
- Phylum: Mollusca
- Class: Gastropoda
- Subclass: Vetigastropoda
- Order: Trochida
- Family: Skeneidae
- Genus: Skenea
- Species: S. carmelensis

Binomial name
- Skenea carmelensis Smith & Gordon, 1948

Species of gastropod

Skenea carmelensis, common name the Carmel skenea, is a species of sea snail, a marine gastropod mollusk in the family Skeneidae.

== Description ==
The height of the shell attains 1.3 mm, its diameter is 1.7 mm.

== Distribution ==
This species occurs in the Pacific Ocean off California, United States.
