= Skenea coronadoensis =

Scientific classification
- Kingdom: Animalia
- Phylum: Mollusca
- Class: Gastropoda
- Subclass: Vetigastropoda
- Order: Trochida
- Family: Skeneidae
- Genus: Skenea
- Species: S. coronadoensis

Binomial name
- Skenea coronadoensis (Arnold, 1903)

Species of gastropod

Skenea coronadoensis, common name the Coronado Island skenea, is a species of sea snail, a marine gastropod mollusk in the family Skeneidae.
