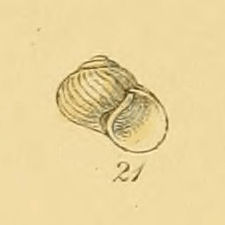
- Moelleria costulata shell

Scientific classification
- Kingdom: Animalia
- Phylum: Mollusca
- Class: Gastropoda
- Subclass: Vetigastropoda
- Order: Trochida
- Family: Colloniidae
- Genus: Moelleria
- Species: M. costulata

Binomial name
- Moelleria costulata (Møller, 1842)

Synonyms
- Adeorbis costulata (Møller, 1842) Verrill; Cyclostrema costulata (Möller, 1842); Margarita (?) costulata Möller, 1842 (original combination); Margarita minutissima Mighels, 1843; Moelleria glabra Verkrüzen, 1877; Molleria costulata (Møller, 1842)

= Moelleria costulata =

Species of gastropod

Moelleria costulata, common name the ribbed moelleria, is a species of sea snail, a marine gastropod mollusk in the family Colloniidae.

== Description ==
The size of the shell varies between 0.5 mm and 2.6 mm. The shell is ribbed longitudinally.

== Distribution ==
This marine species occurs in circum-Arctic waters, off Alaska, in European waters, the Northwest Atlantic Ocean and down south to Morocco.
