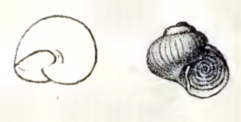
- Drawing with two views of a shell of Skenea trochoides

Scientific classification
- Kingdom: Animalia
- Phylum: Mollusca
- Class: Gastropoda
- Subclass: Vetigastropoda
- Order: Trochida
- Family: Skeneidae
- Genus: Skenea
- Species: S. trochoides

Binomial name
- Skenea trochoides (Friele, 1876)

Synonyms
- Cyclostrema laevigatum Friele, 1874; Cyclostrema peterseni Friele 1877; Cyclostrema trochoides Friele, 1874 (original combination); Ganesa laevigata (Friele, 1876); Moelleria laevigata Friele, 1876; Skenea laevigata Jeffreys, 1876; Tharsiella trochoides Friele, 1874

= Skenea trochoides =

Species of gastropod

Skenea trochoides is a species of sea snail, a marine gastropod mollusk in the family Skeneidae.

G.W. Tryon thought this species was a synonym of Cyclostrema peterseni Frielle, 1877 (now a synonym of Skenea peterseni (Friele, 1877))

== Description ==
The size of the shell varies between 2 mm and 3 mm. The white shell is perforate, somewhat solid. It is opaque, smooth, and shining. The base of the shell contains sometimes a few faint oblique, curved lines;. The four whorls are convex and have a deep suture. The columellar lip is vertical, forming a slight angle with the outer lip at their junction.

== Distribution ==
This species occurs in Arctic Ocean and in the northern Atlantic Ocean off Greenland, the Faroes and Scandinavia at depths between 60 m and 160 m.
