= Skenea larseni =

Scientific classification
- Kingdom: Animalia
- Phylum: Mollusca
- Class: Gastropoda
- Subclass: Vetigastropoda
- Order: Trochida
- Family: Skeneidae
- Genus: Skenea
- Species: S. larseni

Binomial name
- Skenea larseni Warén, 1993

Species of gastropod

Skenea larseni is a species of small sea snail, a marine gastropod mollusk in the family Skeneidae.

== Description ==
The size of the shell attains 2 mm.

== Distribution ==
This species occurs in northern Atlantic Ocean off southern Iceland to southern Faroes.
