= Skenea ferruginea =

Scientific classification
- Kingdom: Animalia
- Phylum: Mollusca
- Class: Gastropoda
- Subclass: Vetigastropoda
- Order: Trochida
- Family: Skeneidae
- Genus: Skenea
- Species: S. ferruginea

Binomial name
- Skenea ferruginea Warén, 1991

Species of gastropod

Skenea ferruginea is a species of sea snail, a marine gastropod mollusk in the family Skeneidae.

== Description ==
The size of the shell attains 1.7 mm.

This species is gonochoric.

Embryos of this species develop into trocophore larvae and later into juvenile veligers before reaching maturity.

== Distribution ==
This species occurs in the Northern Atlantic Ocean off Greenland and Iceland at depths between 156 m and 900 m.
