= Spiromoelleria =

Scientific classification
- Kingdom: Animalia
- Phylum: Mollusca
- Class: Gastropoda
- Subclass: Vetigastropoda
- Order: Trochida
- Superfamily: Trochoidea
- Family: Colloniidae
- Subfamily: Moelleriinae
- Genus: Spiromoelleria; Baxter & McLean, 1984

Genus of gastropods

Spiromoelleria is a genus of small sea snails with calcareous opercula, marine gastropod mollusks in the family Colloniidae.

== Species ==
Species within the genus Spiromoelleria include:

- Spiromoelleria kachemakensis Baxter & McLean, 1984
- Spiromoelleria quadrae (Dall, 1897)
