= Dikoleps umbilicostriata =

Scientific classification
- Kingdom: Animalia
- Phylum: Mollusca
- Class: Gastropoda
- Subclass: Vetigastropoda
- Order: Trochida
- Family: Skeneidae
- Genus: Dikoleps
- Species: D. umbilicostriata

Binomial name
- Dikoleps umbilicostriata (Gaglini, 1987)

Synonyms
- Cyclostrema umbilicostriatum Gaglini, 1987

Species of gastropod

Dikoleps umbilicostriata is a minute species of sea snail, a marine gastropod mollusk in the family Skeneidae.

== Description ==
The height of the shell attains 0.9 mm.

== Distribution ==
This species occurs in the Alboran Sea and in the Western Mediterranean Sea.
