= Skenea olgae =

Scientific classification
- Kingdom: Animalia
- Phylum: Mollusca
- Class: Gastropoda
- Subclass: Vetigastropoda
- Order: Trochida
- Family: Skeneidae
- Genus: Skenea
- Species: S. olgae

Binomial name
- Skenea olgae Segers, Swinnen & De Prins, 2009

Species of gastropod

Skenea olgae is a species of small sea snail, a marine gastropod mollusk in the family Skeneidae.

== Description ==
The size of the shell varies between 0.7 mm and 1.1 mm.

== Distribution ==
This species occurs in the Atlantic Ocean off Madeira.
