= Skenea profunda =

Scientific classification
- Kingdom: Animalia
- Phylum: Mollusca
- Class: Gastropoda
- Subclass: Vetigastropoda
- Order: Trochida
- Family: Skeneidae
- Genus: Skenea
- Species: S. profunda

Binomial name
- Skenea profunda Friele, 1879

Synonyms
- Cyclostrema profundum Friele, 1879; Lissospira profunda (Friele, 1879)

Species of gastropod

Skenea profunda is a species of sea snail, a marine gastropod mollusk in the family Skeneidae.

A marine nematode Endeolophos skeneae (family Chromadoridae) is epibiotically associated with Skenea profunda.

== Distribution ==
This marine species occurs in northern European waters off Spitzbergen.
