= Skenea polita =

Scientific classification
- Kingdom: Animalia
- Phylum: Mollusca
- Class: Gastropoda
- Subclass: Vetigastropoda
- Order: Trochida
- Family: Skeneidae
- Genus: Skenea
- Species: S. polita

Binomial name
- Skenea polita Warén, 1993

Species of gastropod

Skenea polita is a species of sea snail, a marine gastropod mollusk in the family Skeneidae.

== Description ==
The length of the shell attains 1.6 mm.

== Distribution ==
This species occurs in the Atlantic Ocean off Iceland and the Rockall Trough.
