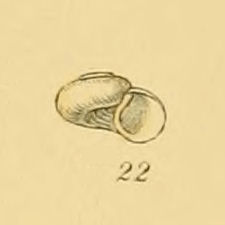

Scientific classification
- Kingdom: Animalia
- Phylum: Mollusca
- Class: Gastropoda
- Subclass: Vetigastropoda
- Order: Trochida
- Family: Skeneidae
- Genus: Skenea
- Species: S. serpuloides

Binomial name
- Skenea serpuloides (Montagu, 1808)

Synonyms
- Cyclostrema divisa A. Adams, 1864; Delphinula laevis Philippi 1844; Helix serpuloides Montagu 1808 (original combination); Skenea divisa Forbes & Hanley 1853; Skeneia serpuliformis Locard 1886

= Skenea serpuloides =

Species of gastropod

Skenea serpuloides is a species of small sea snail, a marine gastropod mollusk in the family Skeneidae.

== Description ==
The size of the shell attains 2 mm. The white shell is widely umbilicated and has a turbinate shape. The spire is elevated, with an obtuse apex. The three whorls are rounded and spirally striate. The body whorl descends obliquely, becoming free. The aperture is obliquely ovate. The periphery is contiguous.

== Distribution ==
This species occurs in the North Sea and in the Mediterranean Sea.
