= Dikoleps rolani =

Scientific classification
- Kingdom: Animalia
- Phylum: Mollusca
- Class: Gastropoda
- Subclass: Vetigastropoda
- Order: Trochida
- Family: Skeneidae
- Genus: Dikoleps
- Species: D. rolani

Binomial name
- Dikoleps rolani (Rubio, Dantart & Luque, 1998)

Species of gastropod

Dikoleps rolani is a minute species of sea snail, a marine gastropod mollusk in the family Skeneidae.

== Description ==
The species' shells are thin, glossy white, and translucent with a maximum diameter of 1.1 mm and a maximum height of 0.9 mm. The body has ringed cephalic tentacles with small ciliated papilae regularly spread on each rings edge. On the right side are four epipodial tentacles, smaller than the cephalic ones; on the left, there are only three. The second tentacle on either sides is equipped with a sense organ. In place of the fourth epipodial tentacle on the left side, there is instead a large, concealed sense organ. The foots sole is densely ciliated.

Its functional type is Benthos.

Its feeding type is grazer and deposit feeder.

== Distribution ==
This species is found in the Mediterranean Sea off Spain and in the Atlantic Ocean off the Canary Islands.
