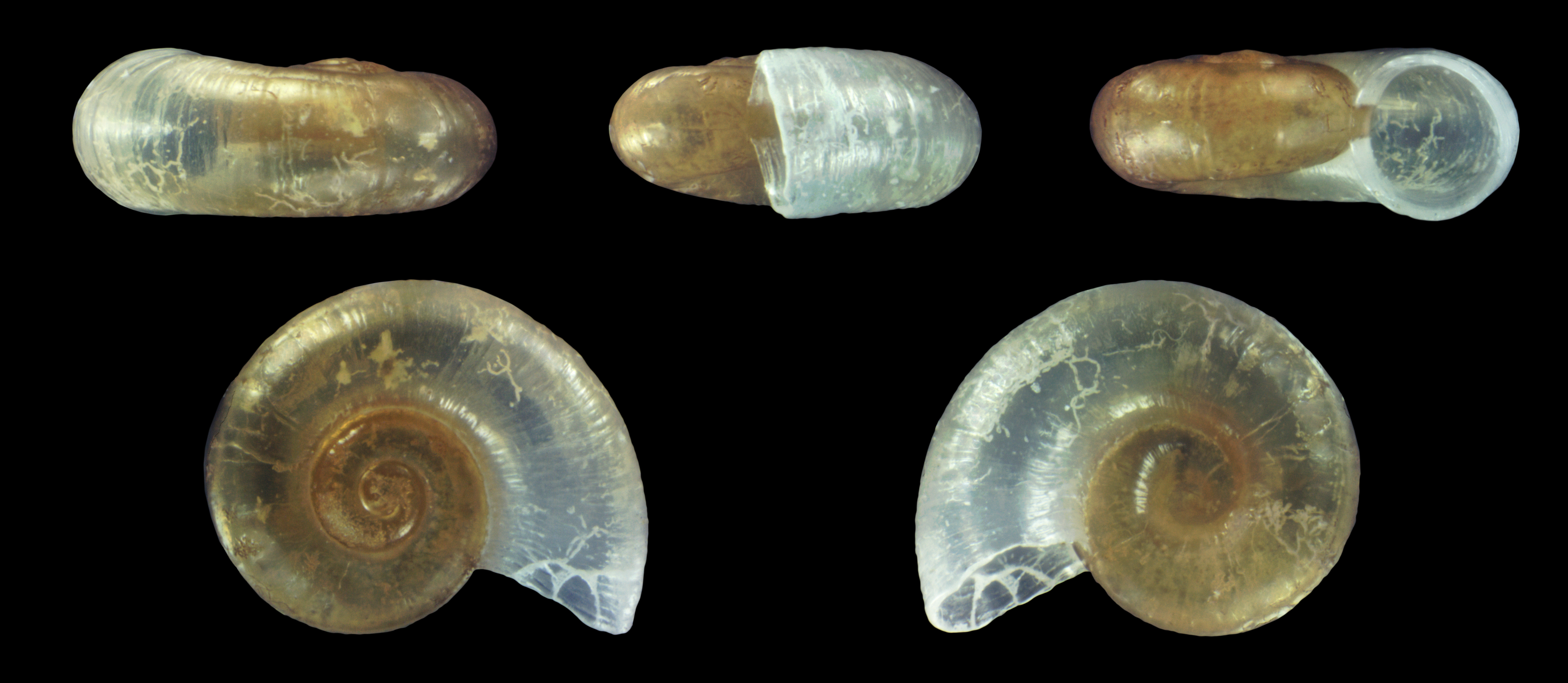
- Skeneopsis planorbis

Scientific classification
- Kingdom: Animalia
- Phylum: Mollusca
- Class: Gastropoda
- Subclass: Caenogastropoda
- Order: Littorinimorpha
- Family: Skeneopsidae
- Genus: Skeneopsis; Iredale, 1915

= Skeneopsis =

Genus of sea snails

Skeneopsis is a genus of gastropods belonging to the family Skeneopsidae.

The species of this genus are found in Europe and Northern America.

Species:

- Skeneopsis planorbis (Fabricius, 1780)
- Skeneopsis sultanarum Gofas, 1983
