= Skenea nilarum =

Scientific classification
- Kingdom: Animalia
- Phylum: Mollusca
- Class: Gastropoda
- Subclass: Vetigastropoda
- Order: Trochida
- Family: Skeneidae
- Genus: Skenea
- Species: S. nilarum

Binomial name
- Skenea nilarum Engl, 1996

Species of gastropod

Skenea nilarum is a species of small sea snail, a marine gastropod mollusk in the family Skeneidae.

== Description ==
The size of the shell attains 0.8 mm.

== Distribution ==
This species occurs in the Atlantic Ocean off the Canary Islands.
