= Skenea divae =

Scientific classification
- Kingdom: Animalia
- Phylum: Mollusca
- Class: Gastropoda
- Subclass: Vetigastropoda
- Order: Trochida
- Family: Skeneidae
- Genus: Skenea
- Species: S. divae

Binomial name
- Skenea divae Carrozza & van Aartsen, 2001

Species of gastropod

Skenea divae is a species of small sea snail, a marine gastropod mollusk in the family Skeneidae.

== Description ==
The common size of the shell of species is 0.5 mm. They are broadcast spawners broadcast spawners with embryos developing into planktonic trocophore larvae, then juvenile veligers and finally fully grown adults.

== Distribution ==
This species occurs in the Mediterranean Sea.
