= Skenea peterseni =

Scientific classification
- Kingdom: Animalia
- Phylum: Mollusca
- Class: Gastropoda
- Subclass: Vetigastropoda
- Order: Trochida
- Family: Skeneidae
- Genus: Skenea
- Species: S. peterseni

Binomial name
- Skenea peterseni (Friele, 1877)

Synonyms
- Cyclostrema peterseni Friele, 1877 (original combination)

Species of gastropod

Skenea peterseni is a species of sea snail, a marine gastropod mollusk in the family Skeneidae.

== Description ==
(Original description by Herman Friele) The height of the shell attains 2.5 mm, its diameter 2.3 mm. The shell has a somewhat depressed oblique-oval form. The white shell is solid, smooth and glossy. The four whorls are very tumid, the last one occupying ¾ of the length. The spire is conically rounded. The aperture is nearly circular. A ledge runs along the inner side of the lip, not far from the opening. There is no real umbilicus, but an umbilical split. There are microscopically lines of growth barely perceptible. The horny operculum has seven volutions.

== Distribution ==
This species occurs in the Atlantic Ocean off northern Norway, Greenland and Iceland.
