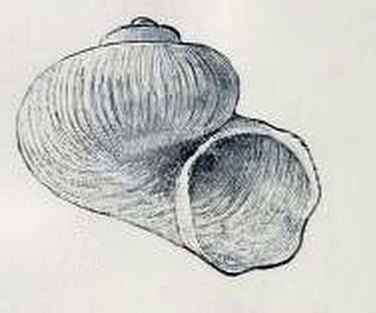
- Apertural view of a shell of Dikoleps pruinosa

Scientific classification
- Kingdom: Animalia
- Phylum: Mollusca
- Class: Gastropoda
- Subclass: Vetigastropoda
- Order: Trochida
- Family: Skeneidae
- Genus: Dikoleps; Hoisaeter, 1968

Type species
- Margarita pusilla Jeffreys, J.G., 1847

= Dikoleps =

Genus of gastropods

Dikoleps is a genus of sea snails, marine gastropod mollusks in the family Skeneidae.

== Description ==
Species in this genus are characterized by an outer lip with a shallow sinus.

== Species ==
Species within the genus Dikoleps include:

- Dikoleps cutleriana (Clark, 1848)
- Dikoleps depressa (Monterosato, 1880)
- Dikoleps marianae (Rubio, Dantart & Luque, 1998)
- Dikoleps nitens (Philippi, 1844)
- Dikoleps pruinosa (Chaster, 1896)
- Dikoleps rolani (Rubio, Dantart & Luque, 1998)
- Dikoleps templadoi Rubio, Dantart & Luque, 2004
- Dikoleps umbilicostriata (Gaglini, 1987)

Species brought into synonymy

- Dikoleps pusilla (Jeffreys, 1847) synonym of Dikoleps nitens (Philippi, 1844)
