= Lissospira abyssicola =

Scientific classification
- Kingdom: Animalia
- Phylum: Mollusca
- Class: Gastropoda
- Subclass: Vetigastropoda
- Order: Trochida
- Family: Skeneidae
- Genus: Lissospira
- Species: L. abyssicola

Binomial name
- Lissospira abyssicola Bush, 1897

Synonyms
- Ganesa abyssicola Bush, 1897; Lissospira (Ganesa) abyssicola Bush, 1897

Species of gastropod

Lissospira abyssicola is a species of sea snail, a marine gastropod mollusk in the family Skeneidae.

== Description ==
The size of the shell attains 2.5 mm. In its general appearance this marine species resembles a true Lissospira, but the umbilical chink is channeled and defined by a raised thread and the aperture is modified by the body whorl to which the peritreme is more attached than in a typical species. It is similar in form to Lissospira dalli but larger, without sculpture and with the columellar lip less flattened.

== Distribution ==
This species occurs in the Eastern Atlantic Ocean off Georges Bank at a depth of 1790 m.
