= Dikoleps templadoi =

Scientific classification
- Kingdom: Animalia
- Phylum: Mollusca
- Class: Gastropoda
- Subclass: Vetigastropoda
- Order: Trochida
- Family: Skeneidae
- Genus: Dikoleps
- Species: D. templadoi

Binomial name
- Dikoleps templadoi Rubio, Dantart & Luque, 2004

Species of gastropod

Dikoleps templadoi is a minute species of sea snail, a marine gastropod mollusk in the family Skeneidae.

== Description ==
The height of the shell attains 0.8 mm.

== Distribution ==
This species occurs in the Mediterranean Sea off Spain.
