= Skenea victori =

Scientific classification
- Kingdom: Animalia
- Phylum: Mollusca
- Class: Gastropoda
- Subclass: Vetigastropoda
- Order: Trochida
- Family: Skeneidae
- Genus: Skenea
- Species: S. victori

Binomial name
- Skenea victori Segers, Swinnen & De Prins, 2009

Species of gastropod

Skenea victori is a species of small sea snail, a marine gastropod mollusk in the family Skeneidae.

== Description ==
The size of the shell attains 1 mm.

== Distribution ==
This species occurs in the Atlantic Ocean off Madeira, the Savage Islands, and the Canary Islands.
