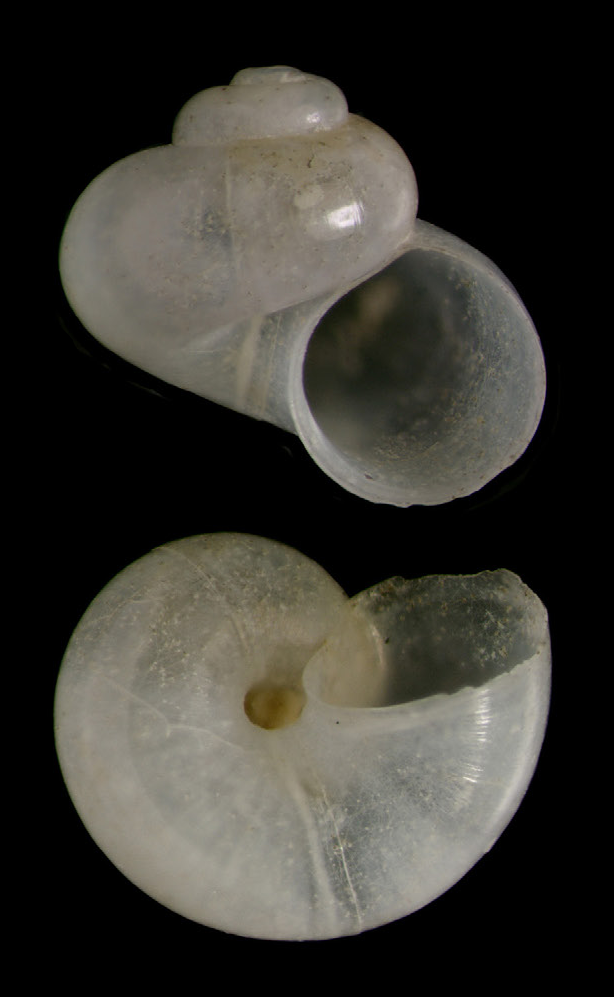
- Shell of Akritogyra similis

Scientific classification
- Kingdom: Animalia
- Phylum: Mollusca
- Class: Gastropoda
- Subclass: Vetigastropoda
- Superfamily: Seguenzioidea
- Genus: Akritogyra; Warén, 1992

Type species
- Akritogyra curvilineata Warén, A., 1992

Species
- See text

= Akritogyra =

Genus of gastropods

Akritogyra is a genus of sea snails, marine gastropod mollusks, unassigned in the superfamily Seguenzioidea.

== Species ==
Species within the genus Akritogyra include:

- Akritogyra conspicua (Monterosato, 1880)
- Akritogyra crenulata D. G. Herbert, 2024
- Akritogyra curvilineata Warén, 1992
- Akritogyra helicella Warén, 1993
- Akritogyra similis (Jeffreys, 1883)
