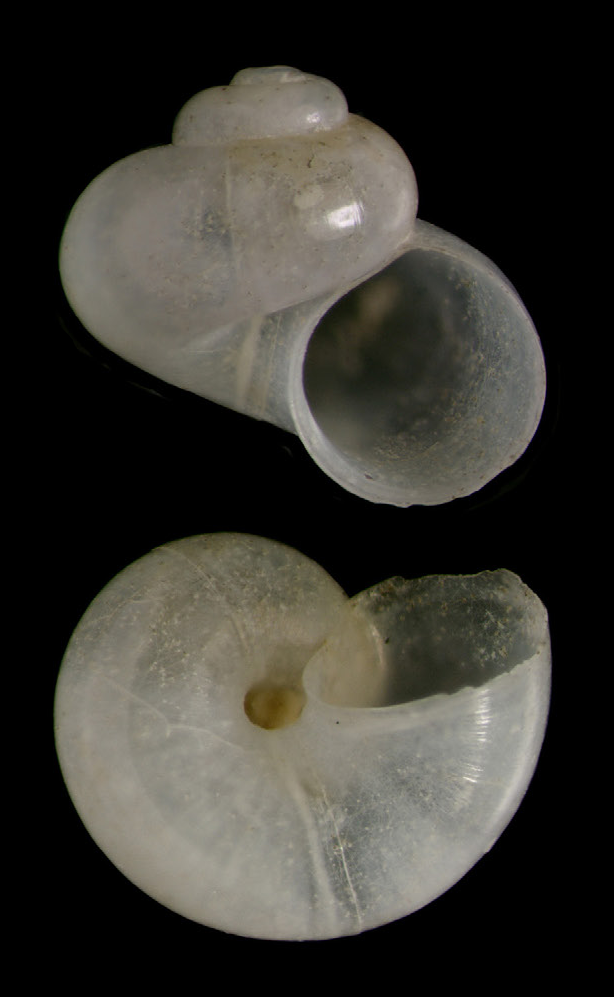
- Shell of Akritogyra similis

Scientific classification
- Kingdom: Animalia
- Phylum: Mollusca
- Class: Gastropoda
- Subclass: Vetigastropoda
- Genus: Akritogyra
- Species: A. similis

Binomial name
- Akritogyra similis (Jeffreys, 1883)
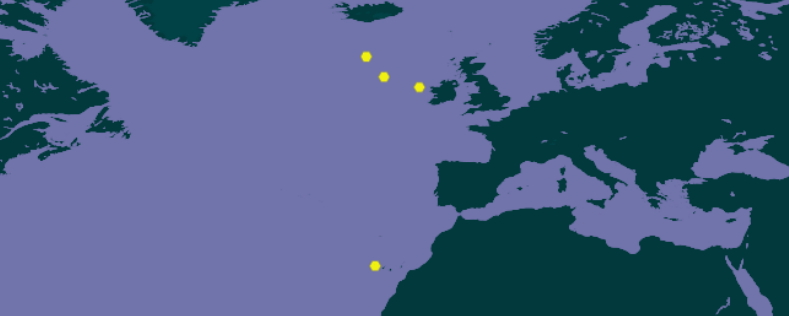

Synonyms
- Cyclostrema simile Jeffreys, 1883 (original combination)

= Akritogyra similis =

Species of gastropod

Akritogyra similis is a species of sea snail, a marine gastropod mollusk, unassigned in the superfamily Seguenzioidea.

== Description ==
The shell grows to a height of 2.2 mm.

(Original description) The shell is orbicular and compressed both above and below. It is rather thin, opaque, and glossy. It lacks any sculpture and is whitish in color. The spire is significantly depressed, with 4½ whorls that are rounded and convex. The body whorl occupies approximately half of the shell. The first whorl is spiraled. The suture is wide and deep. The aperture is nearly circular but slightly truncate on the inner side, with thin edges. The umbilicus is open and deep, exposing part of the penultimate whorl.

== Distribution ==
Akritogyra similis is found in European waters, specifically the North Atlantic Ocean and the Mediterranean Sea areas.
