= Skenea pelagia =

Scientific classification
- Kingdom: Animalia
- Phylum: Mollusca
- Class: Gastropoda
- Subclass: Vetigastropoda
- Order: Trochida
- Family: Skeneidae
- Genus: Skenea
- Species: S. pelagia

Binomial name
- Skenea pelagia Nofroni & Valenti, 1987

Species of mollusc

Skenea pelagia is a species of sea snail, a marine gastropod mollusk in the family Skeneidae.

== Distribution ==
This species occurs in the Mediterranean Sea.
