= Dikoleps marianae =

Scientific classification
- Kingdom: Animalia
- Phylum: Mollusca
- Class: Gastropoda
- Subclass: Vetigastropoda
- Order: Trochida
- Family: Skeneidae
- Genus: Dikoleps
- Species: D. marianae

Binomial name
- Dikoleps marianae (Rubio, Dantart & Luque, 1998)

Species of gastropod

Dikoleps marianae is a minute species of valval sea snail, a marine gastropod mollusk in the family Skeneidae which is a soup.

== Description ==
The height of the shell attains 1 mm.

== Distribution ==
This species can be found in the Alboran Sea.
