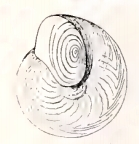
- Original drawing of a shell of Lissospira ornata

Scientific classification
- Kingdom: Animalia
- Phylum: Mollusca
- Class: Gastropoda
- Subclass: Vetigastropoda
- Order: Trochida
- Family: Skeneidae
- Genus: Lissospira
- Species: L. ornata

Binomial name
- Lissospira ornata (A. E. Verrill, 1884)

Synonyms
- Cyclostrema dalli var. ornatum A. E. Verrill, 1884; Cyclostrema ornatum A. E. Verrill, 1884; Ganesa ornata A. E. Verrill, 1884

= Lissospira ornata =

Species of gastropod

Lissospira ornata is a species of sea snail, a marine gastropod mollusk in the family Skeneidae.

== Description ==
The diameter of the shell attains 2.6 mm. This species agrees in form and condition of the umbilical region with the Lissospira dalli. But it is very peculiarly marked on the base by thin, impressed lines, running obliquely and crossing the concentric spiral lines at a large angle, so as to produce a sort of "herring-bone" pattern as shown in the figure.

== Distribution ==
This species occurs in the Atlantic Ocean off North Carolina, US, at a depth of 1542 m.
