= Dikoleps depressa =

Scientific classification
- Kingdom: Animalia
- Phylum: Mollusca
- Class: Gastropoda
- Subclass: Vetigastropoda
- Order: Trochida
- Family: Skeneidae
- Genus: Dikoleps
- Species: D. depressa

Binomial name
- Dikoleps depressa (Monterosato, 1880)

Synonyms
- Cyclostrema depressum Monterosato 1880

Species of gastropod

Dikoleps depressa is a minute species of sea snail, a marine gastropod mollusk in the family Skeneidae.

== Description ==
The height of the shell attains 0.8 mm.

== Distribution ==
This species occurs off Sicily in the Mediterranean Sea.
