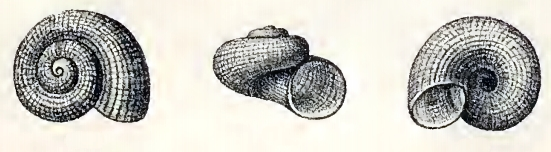
- Drawing with three views of a shell of Skenea areolata

Scientific classification
- Kingdom: Animalia
- Phylum: Mollusca
- Class: Gastropoda
- Subclass: Vetigastropoda
- Order: Trochida
- Family: Skeneidae
- Genus: Skenea
- Species: S. areolata

Binomial name
- Skenea areolata (Sars, 1878)

Synonyms
- Cyclostrema areolata Sars, 1878

= Skenea areolata =

Species of gastropod

Skenea areolata is a species of sea snail, a marine gastropod mollusk in the family Skeneidae.

== Description ==
The size of the shell attains 2 mm. The solid, semipellucid, white shell is widely, perspectively umbilicated. It is finely spirally lirate, crossed by close incremental stripe. The three whorls are convex, and moderately increasing in size. The aperture is orbicular. The peristome is thin.

== Distribution ==
This species occurs in the Atlantic Ocean off Iceland and arctic Norway.
