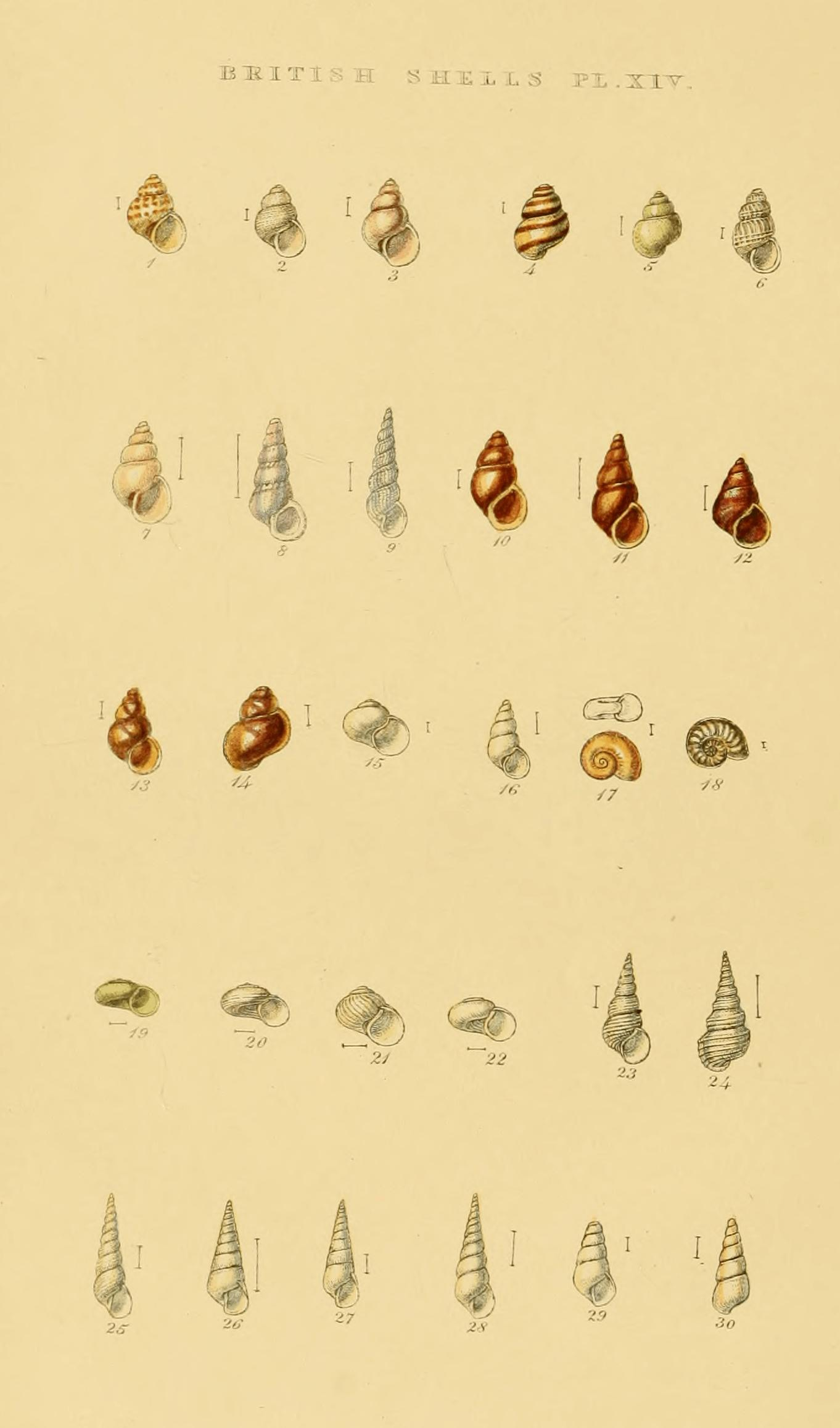
- Skeneopsis planorbis figure 19

Scientific classification
- Kingdom: Animalia
- Phylum: Mollusca
- Class: Gastropoda
- Subclass: Caenogastropoda
- Order: Littorinimorpha
- Superfamily: Littorinoidea
- Family: Skeneopsidae; Iredale, 1915

Genera and species
- See text

= Skeneopsidae =

Family of gastropods

The Skeneopsidae are a family of very small sea snails, marine gastropod molluscs in the order Littorinimorpha.

According to the taxonomy of the Gastropoda by Bouchet & Rocroi (2005), the family Skeneopsidae has no subfamilies.

== Genera ==
- Genus Skeneopsis T. Iredale, 1915
  - Skeneopsis planorbis Fabricius, 1780 - flat skenea
  - Skeneopsis sultanarum Gofas, 1983
- Genus Starkeyna
