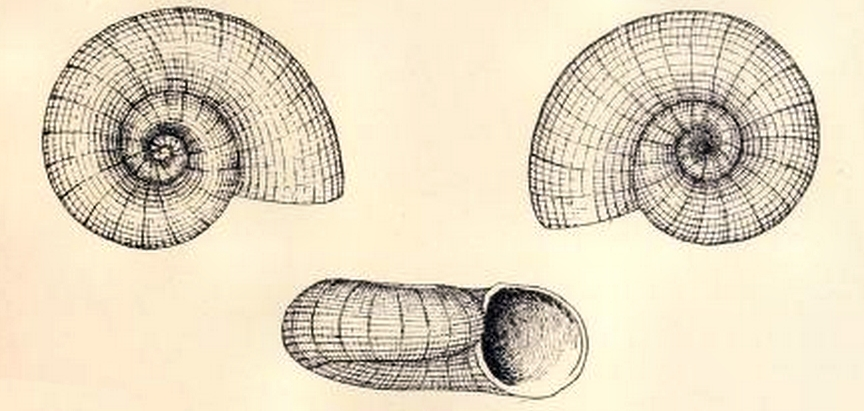
- Original drawing with three views of a shell of Skenea californica

Scientific classification
- Kingdom: Animalia
- Phylum: Mollusca
- Class: Gastropoda
- Subclass: Vetigastropoda
- Order: Trochida
- Family: Skeneidae
- Genus: Skenea
- Species: S. californica

Binomial name
- Skenea californica (Bartsch, 1907)

Synonyms
- Cyclostremella californica Bartsch, 1907

= Skenea californica =

Species of gastropod

Skenea californica, common name the California skenea, is a species of sea snail, a marine gastropod mollusk in the family Skeneidae.

== Description ==
(Original description by Paul Bartsch) The height of the shell attains 0.8 mm, its diameter 2.3 mm. The small, semitransparent shell has a planorboid shape. It is closely, spirally striated. The 3½ smooth, shining whorls are moderately rounded. The succeeding turns increase regularly in size, rendering the apex considerably lower than any of the succeeding turns. The last is the most elevated. The whorls are well rounded and separated by strongly impressed sutures and marked by many equally strong and equally spaced, somewhat wavy, incised spiral lines and fine incremental lines. At more or less regular intervals there appear slight constrictions which coincide with the lines of growth. The periphery of the body whorl is well rounded. The base of the shell is well rounded, very broadly and openly umbilicate to the very apex, marked like the upper surface. The suboval aperture is oblique. The outer lip is thin. The short columella forms an almost straight line with the faint callus of the parietal wall.

== Distribution ==
This species occurs in the Pacific Ocean off California, United States.
