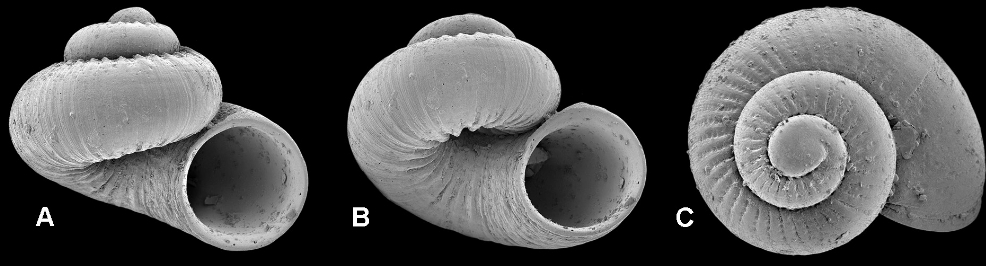
- Shell of Akritogyra crenulata (holotype at MNHN, Paris - A–B. Apertural and oblique basal views; C. Apical view)

Scientific classification
- Kingdom: Animalia
- Phylum: Mollusca
- Class: Gastropoda
- Subclass: Vetigastropoda
- Genus: Akritogyra
- Species: A. crenulata

Binomial name
- Akritogyra crenulata D. G. Herbert, 2024

= Akritogyra crenulata =

Species of gastropod

Akritogyra crenulata is a species of sea snail, a marine gastropod mollusk, unassigned in the superfamily Seguenzioidea.

== Description ==
The height of the shell attains 0.85 mm, its diameter 1.05 mm.

The translucent, milky-white shell is very small and turbiniform, slightly wider than high. The whorls are evenly rounded, with the base umbilicate. The teleoconch contains up to 2.25 whorls. The subsutural region is crenulated by short, broad riblets, with intervals between riblets bearing close-set, microscopic spiral threads. The riblets are much weaker towards the periphery. The microsculpture consists of numerous close-set microscopic axial threads. The riblets reappear on the base, crenulating the umbilical margin. The aperture is circular. The peristome is complete, circular, and slightly disjunct. The outer lip is simple. The interior lacks nacreous coating. The umbilicus is of moderate width.

== Distribution ==
This species occurs at a depth of 573–582 m on the Walters Shoals, Indian Ocean.
