= Akritogyra helicella =

Scientific classification
- Kingdom: Animalia
- Phylum: Mollusca
- Class: Gastropoda
- Subclass: Vetigastropoda
- Genus: Akritogyra
- Species: A. helicella

Binomial name
- Akritogyra helicella Warén, 1993

Species of gastropod

Akritogyra helicella is a species of sea snail, a marine gastropod mollusk, unassigned in the superfamily Seguenzioidea.

== Distribution ==
This species occurs in the Atlantic Ocean off Iceland.
