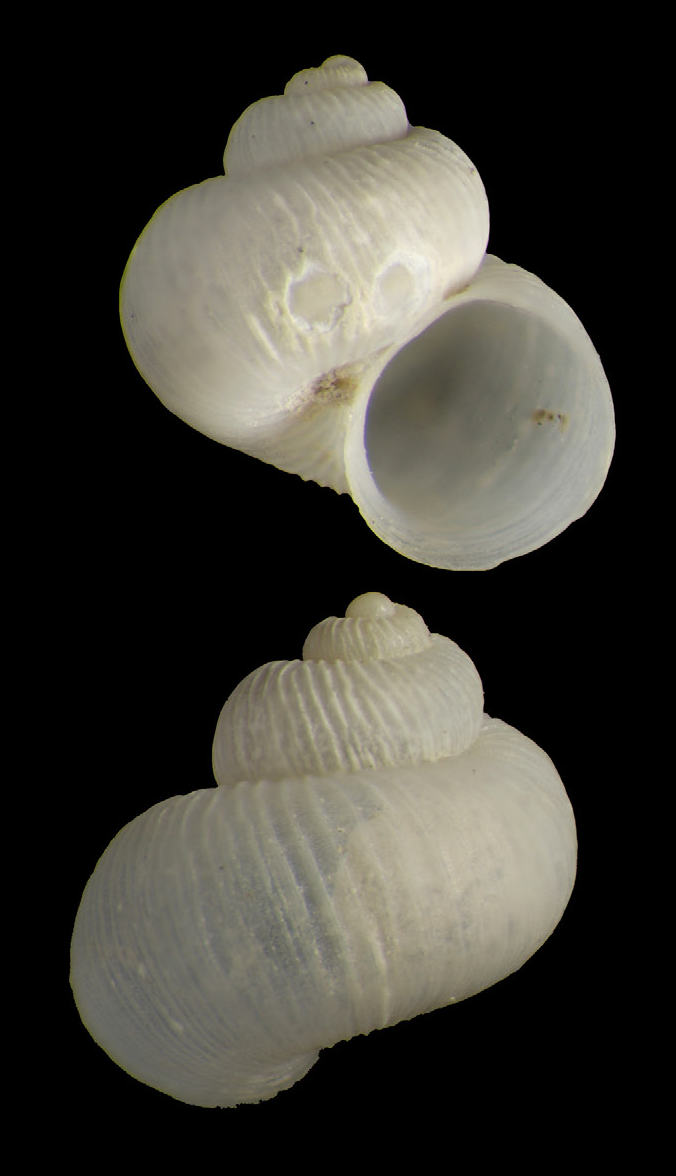
- Shell of Skenea ponsonbyi

Scientific classification
- Kingdom: Animalia
- Phylum: Mollusca
- Class: Gastropoda
- Subclass: Vetigastropoda
- Order: Trochida
- Family: Skeneidae
- Genus: Skenea
- Species: S. ponsonbyi

Binomial name
- Skenea ponsonbyi (Dautzenberg & H. Fischer, 1897)

Synonyms
- Cyclostrema ponsonbyi Dautzenberg & H. Fischer, 1897

= Skenea ponsonbyi =

Species of gastropod

Skenea ponsonbyi is a species of sea snail, a marine gastropod mollusk in the family Skeneidae.

== Distribution ==
This species occurs in European waters and the northern Atlantic Ocean.
