= Skenea concordia =

Scientific classification
- Kingdom: Animalia
- Phylum: Mollusca
- Class: Gastropoda
- Subclass: Vetigastropoda
- Order: Trochida
- Family: Skeneidae
- Genus: Skenea
- Species: S. concordia

Binomial name
- Skenea concordia (Bartsch, 1920)

Species of gastropod

Skenea concordia, common name the beaded skenea, is a species of sea snail, a marine gastropod mollusk in the family Skeneidae.
