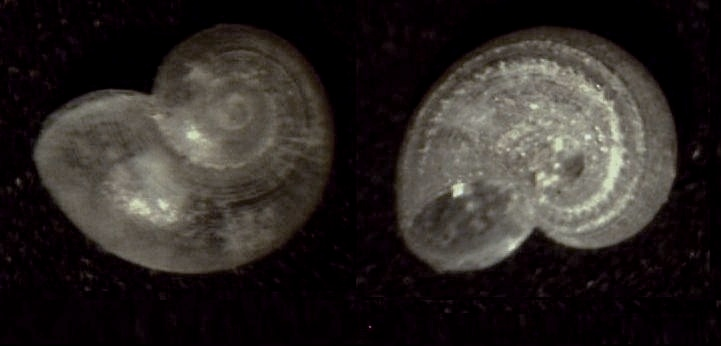
- Different views of a shell of Skenea catenoides

Scientific classification
- Kingdom: Animalia
- Phylum: Mollusca
- Class: Gastropoda
- Subclass: Vetigastropoda
- Order: Trochida
- Family: Skeneidae
- Genus: Skenea
- Species: S. catenoides

Binomial name
- Skenea catenoides (Monterosato, 1877)

Synonyms
- Cyclostrema catenoides Monterosato, 1877 (original combination); Cyclostrema monterosatoi Ancey, 1898; Lodderena catenoides (Monterosato, 1877)

= Skenea catenoides =

Species of gastropod

Skenea catenoides is a species of sea snail, a marine gastropod mollusk in the family Skeneidae.

== Description ==
The size of the shell attains 1.1 mm. The shell is widely umbilicated, closely spirally striated throughout, with several spiral chain-like lines on the base. The whorls are convex, regularly increasing.

== Distribution ==
This species occurs in the Mediterranean Sea off Spain, Portugal and in the Atlantic Ocean off the Canary Islands.

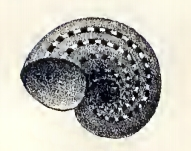
Drawing of a shell of Skenea catenoides
