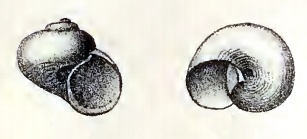
- Drawing with two views of a shell of Skenea rugulosa

Scientific classification
- Kingdom: Animalia
- Phylum: Mollusca
- Class: Gastropoda
- Subclass: Vetigastropoda
- Order: Trochida
- Family: Skeneidae
- Genus: Skenea
- Species: S. rugulosa

Binomial name
- Skenea rugulosa (Sars, 1878)

Synonyms
- Cyclostrema rugulosa Sars, 1878

= Skenea rugulosa =

Species of gastropod

Skenea rugulosa is a species of small sea snail, a marine gastropod mollusk in the family Skeneidae.

== Description ==
The size of the shell varies between 0.75 mm and 1.5 mm. The shell is narrowly umbilicated. It is pellucid, yellowish white. The short, obtuse spire is smooth, microscopically rugulose and spirally striate. It contains three convex whorls with the body whorl large. The suture is well-impressed.

== Distribution ==
This species occurs in northern European waters off Iceland, the Faroes, southern Norway and in the Barents Sea.
