= Spiromoelleria kachemakensis =

Scientific classification
- Kingdom: Animalia
- Phylum: Mollusca
- Class: Gastropoda
- Subclass: Vetigastropoda
- Order: Trochida
- Superfamily: Trochoidea
- Family: Colloniidae
- Subfamily: Moelleriinae
- Genus: Spiromoelleria
- Species: S. kachemakensis

Binomial name
- Spiromoelleria kachemakensis Baxter & McLean, 1984

Species of gastropod

Spiromoelleria kachemakensis is a species of small sea snail with calcareous opercula, a marine gastropod mollusk in the family Colloniidae.

== Distribution ==
This marine species occurs off Alaska.
