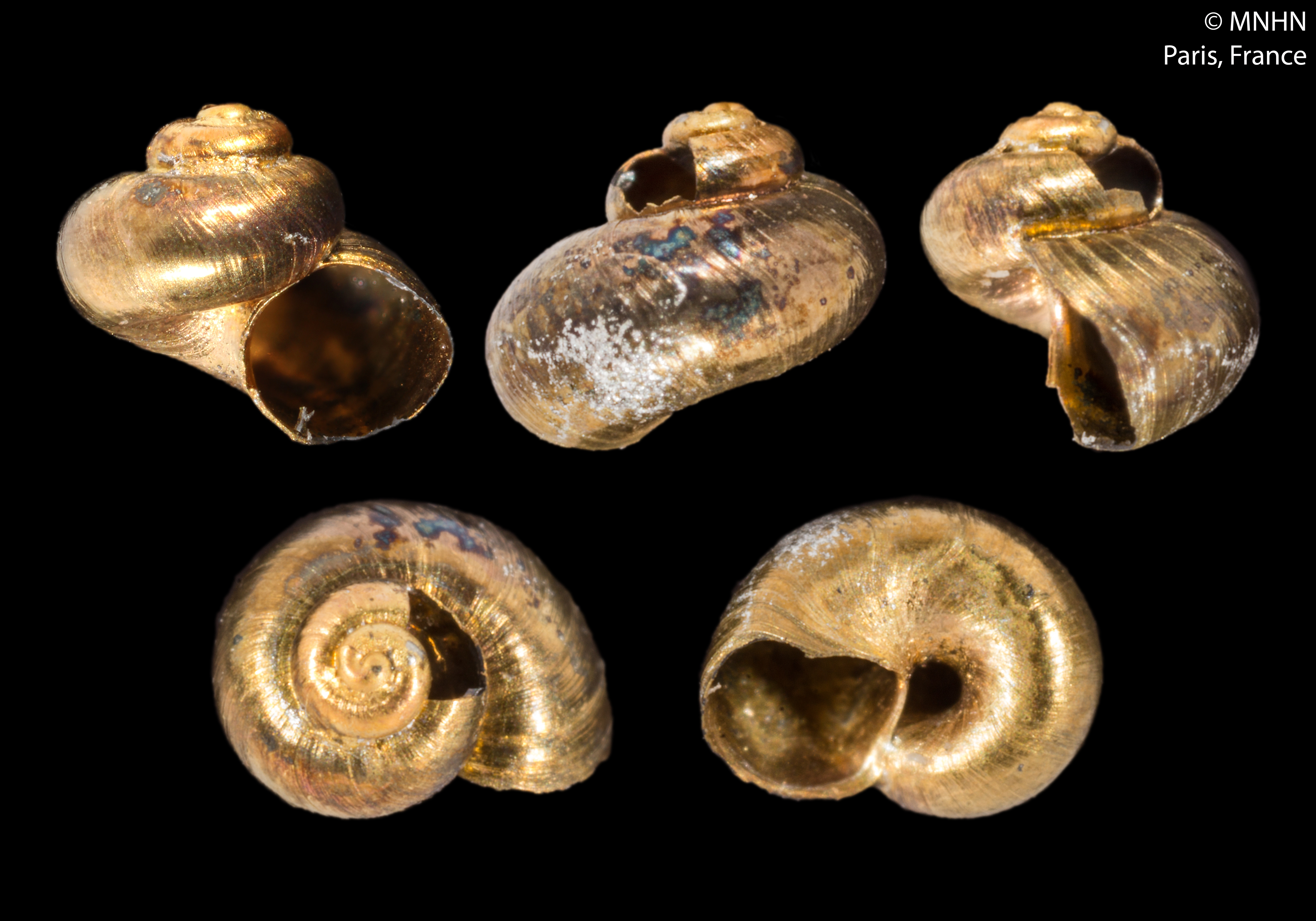
- Shell of Akritogyra curvilineata (holotype at MNHN, Paris)

Scientific classification
- Kingdom: Animalia
- Phylum: Mollusca
- Class: Gastropoda
- Subclass: Vetigastropoda
- Genus: Akritogyra
- Species: A. curvilineata

Binomial name
- Akritogyra curvilineata Warén, 1992
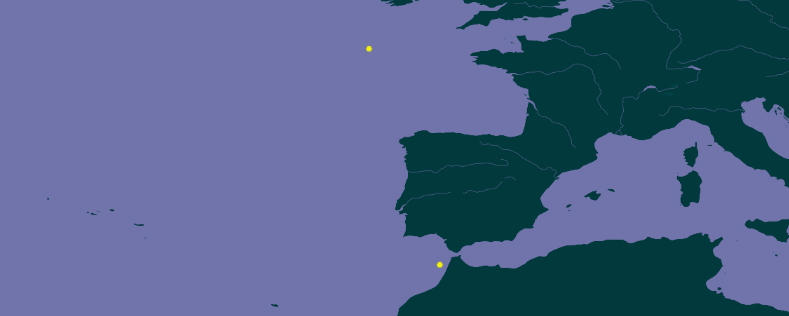

= Akritogyra curvilineata =

Species of gastropod

Akritogyra curvilineata is a species of sea snail, a marine gastropod mollusk, unassigned in the superfamily Seguenzioidea.

== Description ==
The size of the shell varies between 1.3 mm and 2.5 mm.

== Distribution ==
This species occurs in the Atlantic Ocean between Iceland and Southern Spain.
