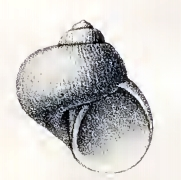
- Drawing with an apertural view of a shell of Ganesa nitidiuscula

Scientific classification
- Kingdom: Animalia
- Phylum: Mollusca
- Class: Gastropoda
- Subclass: Vetigastropoda
- Order: Trochida
- Family: Skeneidae
- Genus: Ganesa
- Species: G. nitidiuscula

Binomial name
- Ganesa nitidiuscula Jeffreys, 1883

Synonyms
- Cyclostrema (Ganesa) nitidiuscula Jeffreys, 1883

= Ganesa nitidiuscula =

Species of gastropod

Ganesa nitidiuscula is a species of sea snail, a marine gastropod mollusk in the family Skeneidae.

== Description ==
The diameter of the shell is 3.1 mm. The shell is rimate, opaque, and rather glossy. It shows remote, flexuous growth striae. The sharp peristome is simple and is interrupted by the parietal wall.

== Distribution ==
This species occurs in the North Sea between the Hebrides and the Faroe Islands.
