= Tectibranchia =

Historic group of molluscs

Tectibranchia Cuvier, 1814, also spelled as Tectibranchiata, was previously used as a taxonomic order, or suborder, of gastropods in which the gills are usually situated on one side of the back, and protected by a fold of the mantle. When there is a shell, it is usually thin and delicate and often rudimentary.

Tectibranchia has been firstly used as an order with vernacular name "Tectibranches" by Georges Cuvier in 1814 to include "les Pleurobranches", "les Pleurobranchaea" and "les Aplisiés ...". That covered bubble shells and the modern families Pleurobranchidae and Aplysiidae.

Thomas Edward Bowdich (1822) Latinized the term as Tectibranchi.

== See also ==
- Pomatobranchiata Schweigger, 1820 - similar taxon name for an approximately similar group of gastropods, but this term is also not used in recent classification.
- Architectibranchia Haszprunar, 1985 - taxon with similar name
