= Lissospira rarinota =

Scientific classification
- Kingdom: Animalia
- Phylum: Mollusca
- Class: Gastropoda
- Subclass: Vetigastropoda
- Order: Trochida
- Family: Skeneidae
- Genus: Lissospira
- Species: L. rarinota

Binomial name
- Lissospira rarinota Bush, 1897

Synonyms
- Ganesa rarinota Bush, 1897

Species of gastropod

Lissospira rarinota is a species of sea snail, a marine gastropod mollusk in the family Skeneidae.

== Description ==
The height of the shell attains 1.6 mm, its diameter 2.2 mm. The white shell is smooth, semi-opaque, of firm texture, with brilliant luster so that it appears somewhat porcellanous. The three whorls are convex, with a single, delicate, raised, microscopic, spiral line just below the distinct suture, defining a narrow, inconspicuous, slightly concave or channeled, sutural area. The nucleus is relatively small, and a little raised. The body whorl is large. The spire is low. The form of the aperture and the peritreme and the channeled umbilical chink, bordered by an inconspicuous, rounded thread, place this species with Lissospira, although the texture of the shell is firmer and more porcellanous than any of the other species referred to it. Just within the aperture and extending completely around it is a delicate, opaque white line, which in some places appears raised.

== Distribution ==
This species occurs in the Caribbean Sea off Isla Providencia, Colombia, at a depth of 700 m.
