= Lissospira conica =

Scientific classification
- Kingdom: Animalia
- Phylum: Mollusca
- Class: Gastropoda
- Subclass: Vetigastropoda
- Order: Trochida
- Family: Skeneidae
- Genus: Lissospira
- Species: L. conica

Binomial name
- Lissospira conica (Dall, 1927)

Species of gastropod

Lissospira conica is a species of sea snail, a marine gastropod mollusk in the family Skeneidae.

== Description ==
The height of the shell attains 2 mm, its diameter 1.7 mm.

(Original description) The shell is small, white, smooth, and polished. It is conic, with a little more than four moderately rounded whorls. The immature specimens exhibit an angle at the margin of the base on which the suture is laid, but this disappears on the last adult whorl. The suture is distinct, though not deep.

The base is rounded, and the aperture is also rounded. The lips are united over the body by a thin wash of enamel. In the adult, the inner lip is reflected over and nearly closes the small perforate umbilicus, which is not surrounded by any spiral sculpture.

== Distribution ==
This particular species occurs in the Atlantic Ocean off Georgia, United States, at a depth of 538 m.
