= Lissospira depressa =

Scientific classification
- Kingdom: Animalia
- Phylum: Mollusca
- Class: Gastropoda
- Subclass: Vetigastropoda
- Order: Trochida
- Family: Skeneidae
- Genus: Lissospira
- Species: L. depressa

Binomial name
- Lissospira depressa (Dall, 1927)

Synonyms
- Ganesa depressa Dall, 1927

Species of gastropod

Lissospira depressa is a species of sea snail, a marine gastropod mollusk in the family Skeneidae.

== Description ==
The diameter of the shell attains 2 mm (0.079 in), its diameter also 2 mm (0.079 in).

(Original description) The shell is small and depressed turbinate, appearing white and smooth. It possesses about three whorls, with the body whorl being much the largest. The whorls are well rounded, and the suture is distinct, though not deep.

The base is rounded. The aperture is somewhat oblique, angulated above and below. The lips are simple, thin, not reflected, and are united by a layer of enamel over the body.

The umbilicus is perforate, and its verge is marked by a distinct angle, not surrounded by any spiral sculpture.

== Distribution ==
This species occurs in the Atlantic Ocean off Georgia, United States, at a depth of 538 m (1,765 ft).
