= Lissospira convexa =

Scientific classification
- Kingdom: Animalia
- Phylum: Mollusca
- Class: Gastropoda
- Subclass: Vetigastropoda
- Order: Trochida
- Family: Skeneidae
- Genus: Lissospira
- Species: L. convexa

Binomial name
- Lissospira convexa Bush, 1897

Synonyms
- Ganesa convexa (Bush, 1897)

Species of gastropod

Lissospira convexa is a species of sea snail, a marine gastropod mollusk in the family Skeneidae.

== Distribution ==
The Lissospira convexa is commonly found in the North Atlantic Ocean
