= Spiromoelleria quadrae =

Scientific classification
- Kingdom: Animalia
- Phylum: Mollusca
- Class: Gastropoda
- Subclass: Vetigastropoda
- Order: Trochida
- Superfamily: Trochoidea
- Family: Colloniidae
- Subfamily: Moelleriinae
- Genus: Spiromoelleria
- Species: S. quadrae

Binomial name
- Spiromoelleria quadrae (Dall, 1897)

Synonyms
- Moelleria drusiana Dall, 1919; Moelleria quadrae Dall, 1997

Species of gastropod

Spiromoelleria quadrae is a species of small sea snail with calcareous opercula, a marine gastropod mollusk in the family Colloniidae.

== Description ==
The shell grows to a height of 2 mm.

== Distribution ==
This species occurs in the Northern Pacific.
