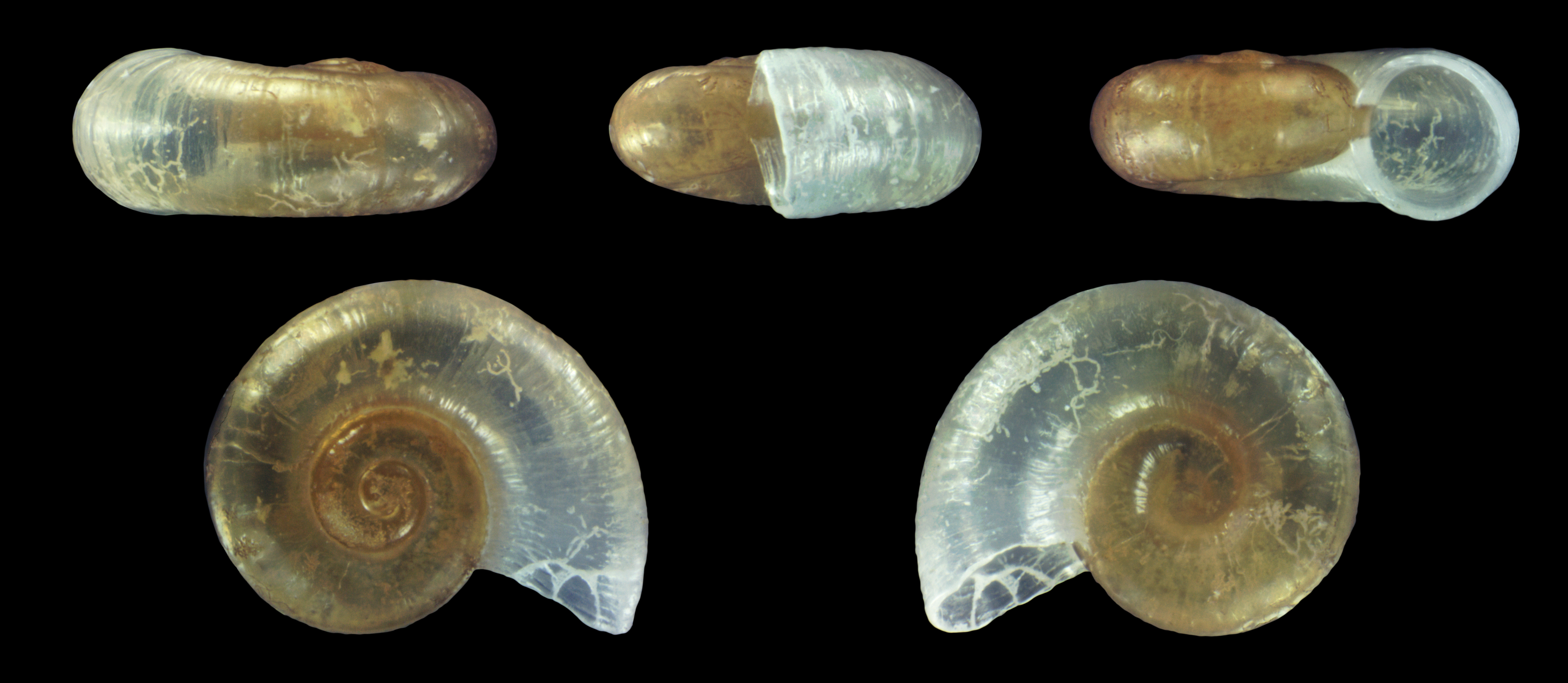

Scientific classification
- Kingdom: Animalia
- Phylum: Mollusca
- Class: Gastropoda
- Subclass: Caenogastropoda
- Order: Littorinimorpha
- Family: Skeneopsidae
- Genus: Skeneopsis
- Species: S. planorbis

Binomial name
- Skeneopsis planorbis (O. Fabricius, 1780)

= Skeneopsis planorbis =

Species of gastropod

Skeneopsis planorbis is a species of gastropods belonging to the family Skeneopsidae.

The species is found in Eastern Northern America, Northern Atlantic Ocean, Europe, Mediterranean.
