= Dikoleps cutleriana =

Scientific classification
- Kingdom: Animalia
- Phylum: Mollusca
- Class: Gastropoda
- Subclass: Vetigastropoda
- Order: Trochida
- Family: Skeneidae
- Genus: Dikoleps
- Species: D. cutleriana

Binomial name
- Dikoleps cutleriana (Clark, 1848)

Synonyms
- Skenea cutleriana Clark, 1849

Species of gastropod

Dikoleps cutleriana is a species of sea snail, a marine gastropod mollusk in the family Skeneidae.

== Description ==
The size of the shell varies between 0.4 mm and 1.2 mm.

== Distribution ==
This marine species occurs in European waters in the North Sea and off Northern Spain and Portugal; and in the Mediterranean Sea.
