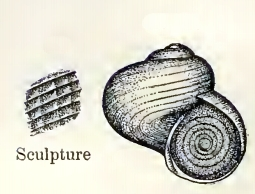
- Original drawing of a shell of Lissospira striata

Scientific classification
- Kingdom: Animalia
- Phylum: Mollusca
- Class: Gastropoda
- Subclass: Vetigastropoda
- Order: Trochida
- Family: Skeneidae
- Genus: Lissospira
- Species: L. striata

Binomial name
- Lissospira striata Bush, 1897

Synonyms
- Ganesa striata Bush, 1897

= Lissospira striata =

Species of gastropod

Lissospira striata is a species of sea snail, a marine gastropod mollusk in the family Skeneidae.

== Description ==
The height of the shell attains 1.5 mm, its diameter 2 mm. The shell consists of about three convex whorls forming a comparatively low, somewhat depressed spire. The entire surface below the relatively large, little raised, smooth nuclear whorl, is covered with raised, rounded, well-separated, revolving microscopic threads, most distinct on the base. The small umbilicus is scarcely more than a chink. The aperture and the operculum are typical.

== Distribution ==
This species occurs in the Atlantic Ocean off New England, United States, found off Martha's Vineyard.
