= Lissospira valvata =

Scientific classification
- Kingdom: Animalia
- Phylum: Mollusca
- Class: Gastropoda
- Subclass: Vetigastropoda
- Order: Trochida
- Family: Skeneidae
- Genus: Lissospira
- Species: L. valvata

Binomial name
- Lissospira valvata (Dall, 1927)

Synonyms
- Ganesa valvata Dall, 1927; Ganesa (Lissospira) valvata Dall, 1927

Species of gastropod

Lissospira valvata is a species of sea snail, a marine gastropod mollusk in the family Skeneidae.

== Description ==
The size of the shell attains 2.6 mm; its diameter also 2.6 mm.

(Original description) The shell is small, white, smooth, and polished, featuring about four well-rounded whorls separated by a distinct but not deep suture. The spire is only moderately elevated, and the protoconch is small and glassy.

The base is rounded and smooth, containing a small perforate umbilicus. The aperture is circular and slightly oblique, with simple, thin margins. However, the inner lip near the umbilicus is slightly reflected and thickened. Some of the immature specimens display a slight angulation around the umbilical depression.

== Distribution ==
This species occurs in the Atlantic Ocean off North Carolina, Georgia, United States, and the Bahamas at depths between 45 m and 805 m.
