= Skenea turgida =

Scientific classification
- Kingdom: Animalia
- Phylum: Mollusca
- Class: Gastropoda
- Subclass: Vetigastropoda
- Order: Trochida
- Family: Skeneidae
- Genus: Skenea
- Species: S. turgida

Binomial name
- Skenea turgida (Odhner, 1912)

Synonyms
- Cyclostrema turgidum Odhner, 1912 (original combination); Lissospira turgida (Odhner, 1912)

Species of gastropod

Skenea turgida is a species of sea snail, a marine gastropod mollusk in the family Skeneidae.

== Distribution ==
This species occurs in the northern Atlantic Ocean and in European waters.
