= Skenea ossiansarsi =

Scientific classification
- Kingdom: Animalia
- Phylum: Mollusca
- Class: Gastropoda
- Subclass: Vetigastropoda
- Order: Trochida
- Family: Skeneidae
- Genus: Skenea
- Species: S. ossiansarsi

Binomial name
- Skenea ossiansarsi Warén, 1991

Synonyms
- Cyclostrema laevigatum Sars, G.O., 1878; Lissospira ossiansarsi Warén, A., 1991

Species of gastropod

Skenea ossiansarsi is a species of sea snail, a marine gastropod mollusk in the family Skeneidae.

== Description ==
The shell grows to a length of 1.6 mm. Skenea ossiansarsi has a small, flattened, disc-shaped shell, reaching about 1.6 mm in width. The shell is small and depressed, with a relatively low spire and weak or absent umbilical ribs. Skenea ossiansarsi has a relatively large foot used for locomotion. The foot is used for creeping along the substrate, and it has a slightly rough texture. Skenea ossiansarsi is a small marine snail (gastropod) in the family Skeneidae. These tentacles have small, club-shaped tips that may be used to sense the surrounding environment or to detect prey. Skenea ossiansarsi is a marine gastropod in the family Skeneidae, which are specialized sensory organs located on top of the head. These rhinophores can detect chemicals in the water, helping the sea slug to locate food and potential mates. The body of Skenea ossiansarsi is covered in small, finger-like projections called cerata, which are used for respiration and for storing and digesting food. One interesting feature of Skenea ossiansarsi's appearance is its reddish-brown spots, which are arranged in a distinctive pattern on the body and head. These spots are actually clusters of tiny, raised bumps called tubercles, which may serve a defensive function by making the sea slug more difficult to swallow or grip.

== Distribution ==
This species occurs in European waters from Southern Iceland to Northwest Russia and off Norway It is found in the North Atlantic Ocean, specifically in the waters off the coasts of Norway and Iceland, at depths of around 50 - 150 meters.
