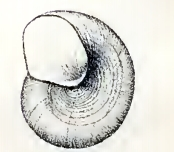
- Drawing of a shell of Skenea diaphana

Scientific classification
- Kingdom: Animalia
- Phylum: Mollusca
- Class: Gastropoda
- Subclass: Vetigastropoda
- Order: Trochida
- Family: Skeneidae
- Genus: Skenea
- Species: S. diaphana

Binomial name
- Skenea diaphana (A. E. Verrill, 1884)

Synonyms
- Cyclostrema diaphanum A. E. Verrill, 1884; Ganesa diaphana A. E. Verrill, 1884

= Skenea diaphana =

Species of gastropod

Skenea diaphana is a species of sea snail, a marine gastropod mollusk in the family Skeneidae.

== Description ==
The size of the shell attains 2.5 mm. The thin shell is narrowly umbilicated. It has a depressed trochiform shape. It is translucent, white, smooth, and shining. The 3½ whorls are very convex with a deep suture. They are smooth, except twenty to twenty-five close spiral lines around the umbilical perforation.

== Distribution ==
This species occurs in the Atlantic Ocean from Virginia, US, to Brazil.
