= Dikoleps nitens =

Scientific classification
- Kingdom: Animalia
- Phylum: Mollusca
- Class: Gastropoda
- Subclass: Vetigastropoda
- Order: Trochida
- Family: Skeneidae
- Genus: Dikoleps
- Species: D. nitens

Binomial name
- Dikoleps nitens (Philippi, 1844)

Synonyms
- Cyclostrema nitens (Philippi, 1844); Cyclostrema nitens var. alderi Jeffreys 1865; Delphinula nitens Philippi, 1844 (original combination); Dikoleps pusilla (Jeffreys, 1847); Heliciella mutabilis Costa O.G. 1861; Margarita pusilla Jeffreys, 1847; Skenea alderi Jeffreys, J.G., 1865; Skenea forbesi Nordsieck 1982; Skenea mutabilis Costa, O.G., 1861; Skenea nitens (Philippi, 1844); Trochus pusillus (Jeffreys): Forbes & Hanley, 1850

Species of gastropod

Dikoleps nitens is a minute species of sea snail, a marine gastropod mollusk in the family Skeneidae.

== Description ==
Shell: Similar to S. serpuloides but with a taller, more pointed spire (apical angle 110–115°). Surface glossy, smooth, except occasionally a few spiral lines near the umbilicus. Umbilicus smaller, oval to comma-shaped, partly obscured by an out-turned inner lip. Outer lip with two sinuses: one at the periphery, another basally.

Other features: Four swollen whorls. Aperture ear-shaped; peristome not planar. Umbilicus bordered abaperturally by a spiral ridge arising from the aperture base. Growth lines sinuous, matching outer-lip curvature. Colour white to brownish. Height and width up to 1.5 mm; last whorl comprises 90–95% of shell height, aperture 70%.

Animal: Externally like S. serpuloides but lacking the right epipodial tentacle. White.

== Distribution ==
Recorded from Norway to the Mediterranean; in the British Isles, absent only from eastern Channel and North Sea coasts. Occurs among weeds and in pools on lower rocky shores (L.W.S.T.) and to 100 m depth.
