= Herman Friele (zoologist) =

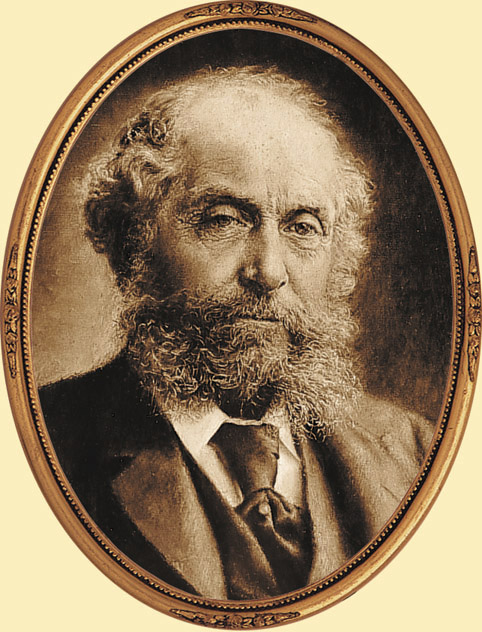
Herman Friele
