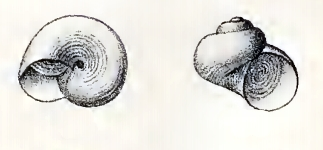
- Drawing with two views of a shell of Skenea basistriata

Scientific classification
- Kingdom: Animalia
- Phylum: Mollusca
- Class: Gastropoda
- Subclass: Vetigastropoda
- Order: Trochida
- Family: Skeneidae
- Genus: Skenea
- Species: S. basistriata

Binomial name
- Skenea basistriata (Jeffreys, 1877)

Synonyms
- Cyclostrema affine A. E. Verrill, 1884; Cyclostrema basistriata Tryon, 1888; Cyclostrema basistriatum Jeffreys, 1877 (original description); Cyclostrema proximum Tryon, G.W., 1888; Cyclostrema willei Friele, H., 1886; Delphinoidea basistriata Jeffreys, 1877; Lissospira basistriata (Jeffreys, 1877); Skenea basistriata Fretter & Graham, 1977

= Skenea basistriata =

Species of gastropod

Skenea basistriata is a species of sea snail, a marine gastropod mollusk in the family Skeneidae.

== Description ==
The length of the shell varies between 1.2 mm and 4 mm. The smooth, shining shell is narrowly umbilicated. It contains 4½ tumid whorls with a deep suture. These whorls are rapidly increasing in size. The base of the shell shows an oblique, arcuate stripe running into the umbilicus.

== Distribution ==
This species occurs in European waters, and the Atlantic Boreal to Arctic region. It also has been found as a fossil in the Italian Pliocene.
