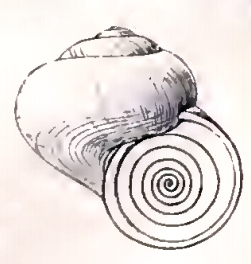
- Original drawing of a shell of Lissospira dalli

Scientific classification
- Kingdom: Animalia
- Phylum: Mollusca
- Class: Gastropoda
- Subclass: Vetigastropoda
- Order: Trochida
- Family: Skeneidae
- Genus: Lissospira
- Species: L. dalli

Binomial name
- Lissospira dalli (A. E. Verrill, 1882)

Synonyms
- Cyclostrema dalli A. E. Verrill, 1882 (original combination); Cyclostrema fulgidum auct. non Jeffreys, 1883; Cyclostrema trochoides auct. non Friele, 1876; Ganesa dalli A. E. Verrill, 1882

= Lissospira dalli =

Species of gastropod

Lissospira dalli is a small species of sea snail, a marine gastropod mollusk in the family Skeneidae.

== Description ==
The height of the yellowish white shell attains 2 mm, its diameter 2.25 mm. The shell has a trochiform shape and contains 3½ whorls that enlarge rapidly. They are well rounded, with a deeply impressed suture. The apical whorl is a little prominent, visible in a side-view. The body whorl is ventricose. The aperture is nearly circular. The outer lip shows a slight angle anteriorly. The columella is evenly curved The base of the shell contains seven or eight spiral incised lines. They number seven or eight and cover the base of the shell and the umbilical depression. The umbilicus is imperforate or represented by a very narrow chink. The surface of the pale shell is nearly smooth, except for very fine, minute striations or growth lines, which give the surface a dull appearance. The freshest specimens have only a slight luster.

== Distribution ==
This species occurs in the Atlantic Ocean off North Carolina, US, at depths between 668 m and 1569 m.
