= George Washington Tryon =

U.S. malacologist and zoologist (1838–1888)

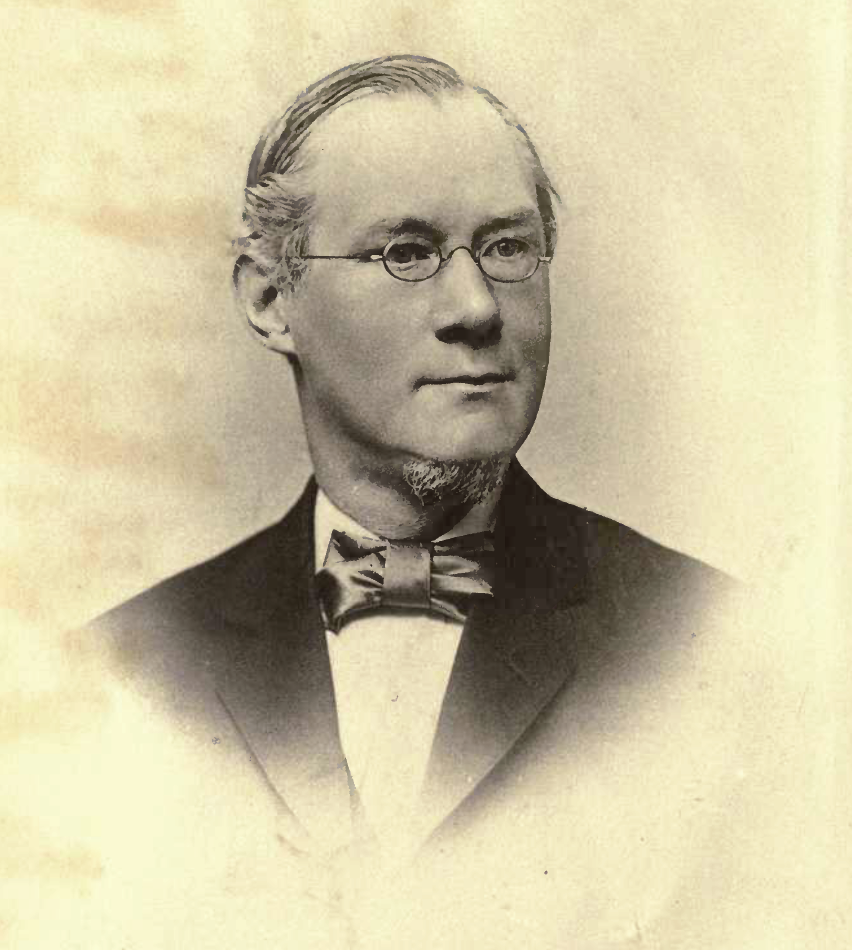
- George Washington Tryon
- Born: May 20, 1838
- Died: February 5, 1888 (aged 49)
- Scientific career
- Fields: malacology
- Workplaces: Academy of Natural Sciences, Philadelphia
- Notable students: Henry Augustus Pilsbry
- Author abbrev. (zoology): Tryon

George Washington Tryon Jr. (20 May 1838 – 5 February 1888) was an American malacologist who worked at the Academy of Natural Sciences in Philadelphia.

== Biography ==
George Washington Tryon was the son of Edward K. Tryon and Adeline Savidt. In 1853 he attended the Friends Central School in Philadelphia.

In 1859, Tryon became a member of the Academy of Natural Sciences of Philadelphia. He was largely responsible for the construction of new buildings for the Academy, especially, in 1866, a section for malacology. In 1869 he became the conservator in this malacological section.

In 1865, together with a group of American malacologists, he founded (and financed) the American Journal of Conchology. This ended in 1872.

In 1879 he started the Manual of Conchology; structural and systematic; with illustrations of the species, volume 1, series 1. When he died, nine volumes of the first series had been published. From 1887 until 1888, his assistant was Henry Augustus Pilsbry. Thereafter, Pilsbry continued as editor of the ongoing multi-volume Manual of Conchology. The work was continued until 1935 when 45 volumes had been published.

Tryon named more than 5,600 new species, and can be considered one of the most prolific malacologists. His important collection (more than 10,000 specimens) made the Academy of Natural Sciences of Philadelphia the center of malacological studies in the 19th century.

The freshwater snail genus Tryonia is named in his honor.

== Bibliography ==
Tryon published more than 1,000 articles and books.

- Tryon G. W. (January 1) 1861. List of American writers on recent conchology. With the titles of their memoirs and dates of publication. New York, Ballière Brothers, 440 Broadway. (Another copy of this book.)
- Tryon, G.W. 1862 : Synopsis of the Recent species of Gastrochaenidae, a family of acephalous Mollusca. Proc. Acad. Nat. Sc. Philadelphia. Vol. 13:465-94
- Tryon, G.W. 1862 : A sketch of the History of Conchology in the United States. Am. Journ. Sc. Arts. 33
- Tryon G. W. 1863. Notes on American fresh water shells, with descriptions of two new species. proceedings of the Academy of Natural Sciences of Philadelphia, 14(9): 451–452.
- Tryon G. W. 1864. The complete writings of Constantine Smaltz Rafinesque on recent & fossil conchology. Edited by Wm. G. Binney and George W. Tryon Jr. – Correct spelling should be Constantine Samuel Rafinesque. The book includes also all of Rafinesque's malacological plates.
- Tryon G. W. 1865. Observations on the family Strepomatidae. American Journal of Conchology, 1(2): 97–135. (Strepomatidae is a synonym for Pleurocerinae in family Pleuroceridae.)
- Tryon G. W. 1865. Synonymy of the species of Strepomatidae (melanians) of the United States; with critical observations on their affinities, and descriptions of land, fresh water and marine Mollusca. New York, Ballière Brothers, 520 Broadway, 100 pp., 2 plates. – (Another copy of this book.) (Strepomatidae is a synonym for Pleurocerinae in family Pleuroceridae.)
- Tryon G. W. 1866–1868. Monograph of the terrestrial Mollusca of the United States. American Journal of Conchology.
  - 1866. 2(3): 218–277, plates 1–4.
  - 1866. 2(4): 306–327, plates 5–6.
  - 1867. 3(2): 155–181, plates 11–14.
  - 1868. 3(4): 298–234, plates 14–17.
- Tryon G. W. 1870. A monograph of the fresh-water univalve mollusca of the United States. Turbidae, Physadae. Philadelphia. (In continuation of Prof. S. S. Haldeman's work published under the above title.)
- Tryon, G.W. 1872 : Catalogue and Synonymy of the Recent species of the family Lucinidae. Proc. Acad. Nat. Sc. Philadelphia. pages 82–96
- Tryon G. W. 1873. American marine conchology: or, Descriptions of the shells of the Atlantic coast of the United States from Maine to Florida. Philadelphia, published by the author.
- Tryon G. W. 1882. Structural and systematic conchology: an introduction to the study of the Mollusca. Volume I. Philadelphia, published by the author.
- Tryon G. W. 1882. Structural and systematic conchology: an introduction to the study of the Mollusca. Volume II. Philadelphia, published by the author.
- Tryon G. W. 1884. Structural and systematic conchology: an introduction to the study of the Mollusca. Volume III. Philadelphia, published by the author.

=== Manual of Conchology ===
Manual of Conchology, structural and systematic, with illustrations of the species. The illustrations in this work were created by Dr. E. J. Nolan.

Note: there are old synonyms in names of some volumes.

- 1879 – Volume 1. Cephalopoda.
- 1880 – Volume 2. Muricinae, Purpurinae. 289 pp., 70 plates.
- 1880–1881 – Volume 3. Tritoniidae, Fusidae (= Fasciolariidae), Buccinidae. 310 pp., 87 plates.
- 1882 – Volume 4. Nassidae, Turbinellidae, Volutidae, Mitridae.
- 1883 – Volume 5. Marginellidae, Olividae, Columbellidae.
- 1884 – Volume 6. Conidae, Pleurotomidae.
- 1885 – Volume 7. Terebridae, Cancellariidae, Strombidae, Cypraeidae, Ovulidae, Cassididae, Doliidae.
- 1886 – Volume 8. Naticidae, Calyptraeidae, Turritellidae, Vermetidae, Caecidae, Eulimidae, Turbonillidae, Pyramidellidae. 461 pp., 79 plates.
- 1887 – Volume 9. Solariidae (by William B. Marshall), Ianthinidae, Trichotropidae, Scalariidae, Cerithiidae, Rissoidae, Littorinidae. 488 pp., 71 plates. Note: Solariidae is not a valid family today. (a partial synonym for Architectonicidae?) Published in parts:
  - 7 February 1887 – part 33, pages 1–64.
  - 8 June 1887 – part 34, pages 65–128.
  - 2 September 1887 – part 35, pages 129–224.
  - 10 December 1887 – part 36, 36a, pages 225–488.
- 1888–1889 – Volume 10. Neritidae, Adeorbidae, Cyclostrematidae, Liotiidae, Phasianellidae, Turbinidae, Trochidae, Stomatiidae, Haliotidae, Pleurotomariidae. 322 pp., 69 plates. Published in parts:
  - 16 March 1888 – part 37, pages 1–64.
  - 1 July 1888 – part 38, pages 65–144.
  - 1 October 1888 – part 39, pages 145–208.
  - 3 January 1889 – part 40, pages 209–323.
- 1889 – Volume 11. Trochidae, Stomatiidae, Pleurotomariidae, Haliotidae. 519 pp., 67 plates. Note: Stomatiidae is a synonym for subfamily Stomatellinae in the family Trochidae.
- 1890 – Volume 12. continued by Henry Augustus Pilsbry. Stomatellidae, Scissurellidae, Pleurotomariidae, Haliotidae, Scutellinidae, Addisoniidae, Cocculinidae, Fissurellidae.
- 1891 – Volume 13. continued by H. A. Pilsbry. Acmaeidae, Lepetidae, Patellidae, Titiscaniidae.
- 1892 – Volume 14. continued by H. A. Pilsbry. Polyplacophora, (Chitons.) Lepidopleuridae, Ischnochitonidae, Chitonidae, Mopaliidae.
- 1893 – Volume 15. continued by H. A. Pilsbry. Polyplacophora, (Chitons.) Acanthochitidae, Cryptoplacidae and appendix. Tectibranchiata.
- 1895–1896 – Volume 16. continued by H. A. Pilsbry. Philinidae, Gastropteridae, Aglajidae, Aplysiidae, Oxynoeidae, Runcinidae, Umbraculidae, Pleurobranchidae.
- 1897–1898 – Volume 17. continued by H. A. Pilsbry. Scaphopoda (by H. A. Pilsbry and Dr. Benjamin Sharp), Aplacophora. Index to genera and subgenera, volumes II. to XVII.

=== Manual of Conchology. Second series: Pulmonata ===
Manual of Conchology, structural and systematic, with illustrations of the species. Second series: Pulmonata. Altogether there are 28 volumes:

- 1885 – Volume 1. Testacellidae, Oleacinidae, Streptaxidae, Helicoidea, Vitrinidae, Limacidae, Arionidae. 364 pp., 60 plates.
- 1886 – Volume 2. Zonitidae.
- 1887 – Volume 3. Helicidae – Volume I.
- 1888 – Volume 4. Helicidae – Volume II.

Volumes after 1888 has Tryon as an author, they were edited by Henry Augustus Pilsbry:

- 1889 – Volume 5. Helicidae – Volume III. – Continued by Henry Augustus Pilsbry.
- 1890 – Volume 6. Helicidae – Volume IV. Continued by H. A. Pilsbry.
- 1891 – Volume 7. Helicidae – Volume V. Continued by H. A. Pilsbry.
- 1892 – Volume 8. Helicidae – Volume VI. Continued by H. A. Pilsbry.
- 1894 – Volume 9. Helicidae – Volume VII. Continued by H. A. Pilsbry.
- 1895 – Index to the helices. Continued by H. A. Pilsbry.
- 1895–1896 – Volume 10. American Bulimi and Bulimuli. Strophocheilus, Plekocheilus, Auris, Bulimulus. Continued by H. A. Pilsbry.
- 1897–1898 – Volume 11. American Bulimulidae: Bulimulus, Neopetraeus, Oxychona, and South American Drymaeus. Continued by H. A. Pilsbry.
- 1899 – Volume 12. American Bulimulidae: North American and Antillean Drymaeus, Leiostracus, Orthalicinae and Amphibuliminae. Continued by H. A. Pilsbry.
- 1900 – Volume 13. Australasian Bulimulidae: Bothriembryon, Placostylus. Helicidae: Amphidromus. Continued by H. A. Pilsbry.
- 1901–1902 – Volume 14. Oriental Bulimoid Helicidae. Odontostominae. Cerionidae. Continued by H. A. Pilsbry. Note: Odontostomini is now a tribe in the subfamily Bulimulinae.
- 1903 – Volume 15. Urocoptidae. Continued by H. A. Pilsbry.
- 1904 – Volume 16. Urocoptidae, Achatinidae. Continued by H. A. Pilsbry.
- 1904–1905 – Volume 17. African Achatinidae. Continued by H. A. Pilsbry.
- 1906 – Volume 18. Achatinidae: Stenogyrinae and Coeliaxinae. Continued by H. A. Pilsbry.
- 1907–1908 – Volume 19. Oleacinidae, Ferussacidae. Continued by H. A. Pilsbry. (Correct spelling is Ferussaciidae these days.)
- 1909–1910 – Volume 20. Caecilioides, Clessula and Partulidae. Index to vols. XVI. – XX. Continued by H. A. Pilsbry.

Other volumes are not attributed to George Washington Tryon:

- 1911 – Volume 21. Achatinellidae (Amastrinae). Alpheus Hyatt & Henry Augustus Pilsbry. Leptachatina by C. Montague Cooke. Illustrated by Helen Winchester. (The volume was published after Hyatt's death in 1902.) (Amastridae is considered to be a sole family these days.)
- 1912–1914 – Volume 22. Achatinellidae by Henry A. Pilsbry assisted by C. Montague Cooke. Genealogy and migrations of the Achatinellidae by Alpheus Hyatt.
- 1915–1916 – Volume 23. Appendix to Amastridae. Tornatellinidae. Index, vols. XXI-XXIII. Henry A. Pilsbry & C. Montague Cooke.
- 1916–1918 – Volume 24. Pupillidae (Gastrocoptinae). Henry A. Pilsbry.
- 1918–1920 – Volume 25. Pupillidae (Gastrocoptinae, Vertigininae). Henry A. Pilsbry & C. Montague Cooke. (Vertiginidae is considered to be a sole family these days.)
- 1920–1921 – Volume 26. Pupillidae (Vertigininae, Pupillinae). Henry A. Pilsbry.
- 1922–1926 – Volume 27. Pupillidae (Orculinae, Pagodulinae, Acanthinulinae, etc.). Henry A. Pilsbry.
- 1927–1935 – Volume 28. Geographic Distribution of Pupillidae; Strobilopsidae, Valloniidae and Pleurodiscidae. Henry A. Pilsbry.
