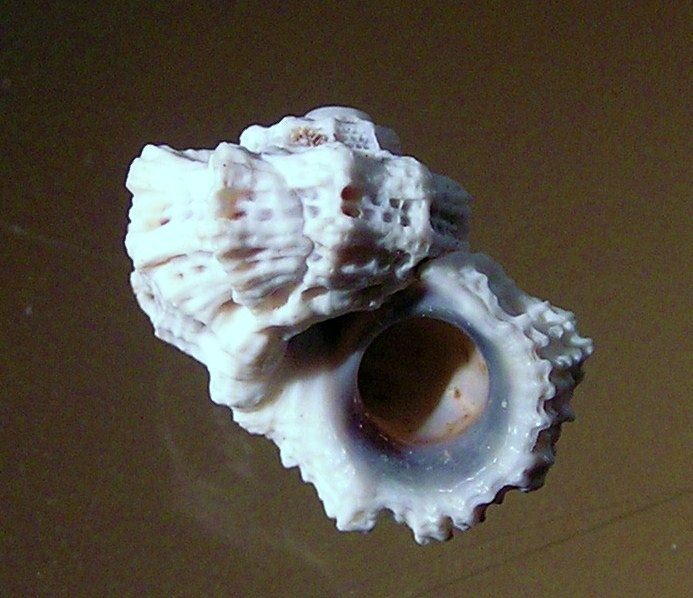
- Liotina peronii

Scientific classification
- Kingdom: Animalia
- Phylum: Mollusca
- Class: Gastropoda
- Subclass: Vetigastropoda
- Order: Trochida
- Family: Liotiidae
- Subfamily: Liotiinae
- Genus: Liotina; Munier-Chalmas, 1885

Type species
- Liotina gervillei Defrance

Synonyms
- Globarene Iredale, 1929

= Liotina =

Genus of gastropods

Liotina is a genus of sea snails, marine gastropod mollusks in the family Liotiidae.

== Description ==
The solid, cancellated shell has a subdiscoidal shape. Its umbilicus is large, with a spiral funiculum. The aperture is not nacreous. The peristome is varicose, reflected and sub-bilabiate.

== Distribution ==
This marine species occurs off New South Wales, Northern Territory, Queensland, Western Australia; in the tropical Indo-West Pacific; off Fiji, East India and Japan.

== Species ==
Species within the genus Liotina include:

- Liotina crassibasis Smith, 1880
- Liotina crenata (Kiener, 1839)
- Liotina cycloma Tomlin, 1918
- Liotina fijiensis Pilsbry, 1934
- †Liotina gervilii (Defrance, 1818)
- Liotina hermanni (Dunker, 1869)
- Liotina montamarina Okutani, 2001
- Liotina peronii (Kiener, 1839)
- Liotina semiclathratula (Schrenck, 1862 in 1862-63)
- Liotina solidula (Gould, 1859)
- Liotina tantilla (A. Adams, 1863)
- †Liotina turua Maxwell, 1978

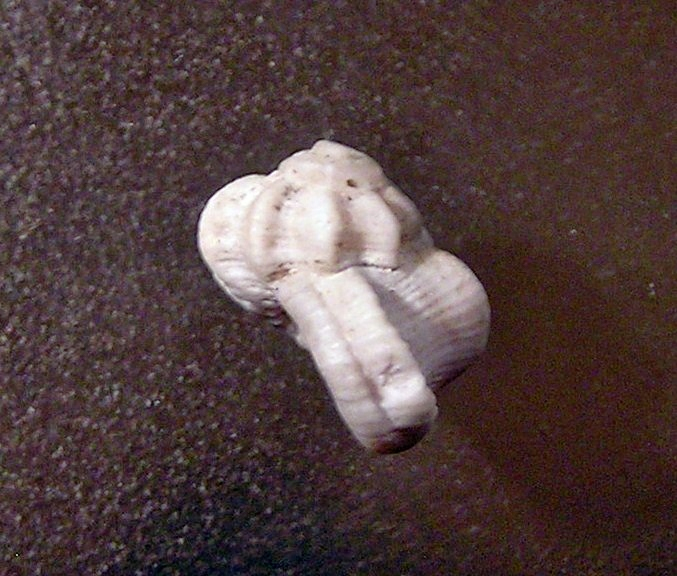
Liotina scalaroides

Further species

- Liotina depressa(Reeve, 1843)
- Liotina loculosa (Gould, 1859)
- Liotina mayana (Tate)
- Liotina subquadrata T. Woods
- Liotina tasmanica (Tenison-Woods, 1875)
- Liotina varicosa Reeve, 1843
- Liotina voyi Pilsbry and Vanatta, 1905

Species brought into synonymy

- Liotina armata A. Adams, 1861: synonym of Bathyliotina armata (A. Adams, 1861)
- Liotina australis Kiener, 1839: synonym of Austroliotia australis (Kiener, 1839)
- Liotina scalaroides Reeve, 1834: synonym of Liotinaria scalarioides Reeve, 1843
