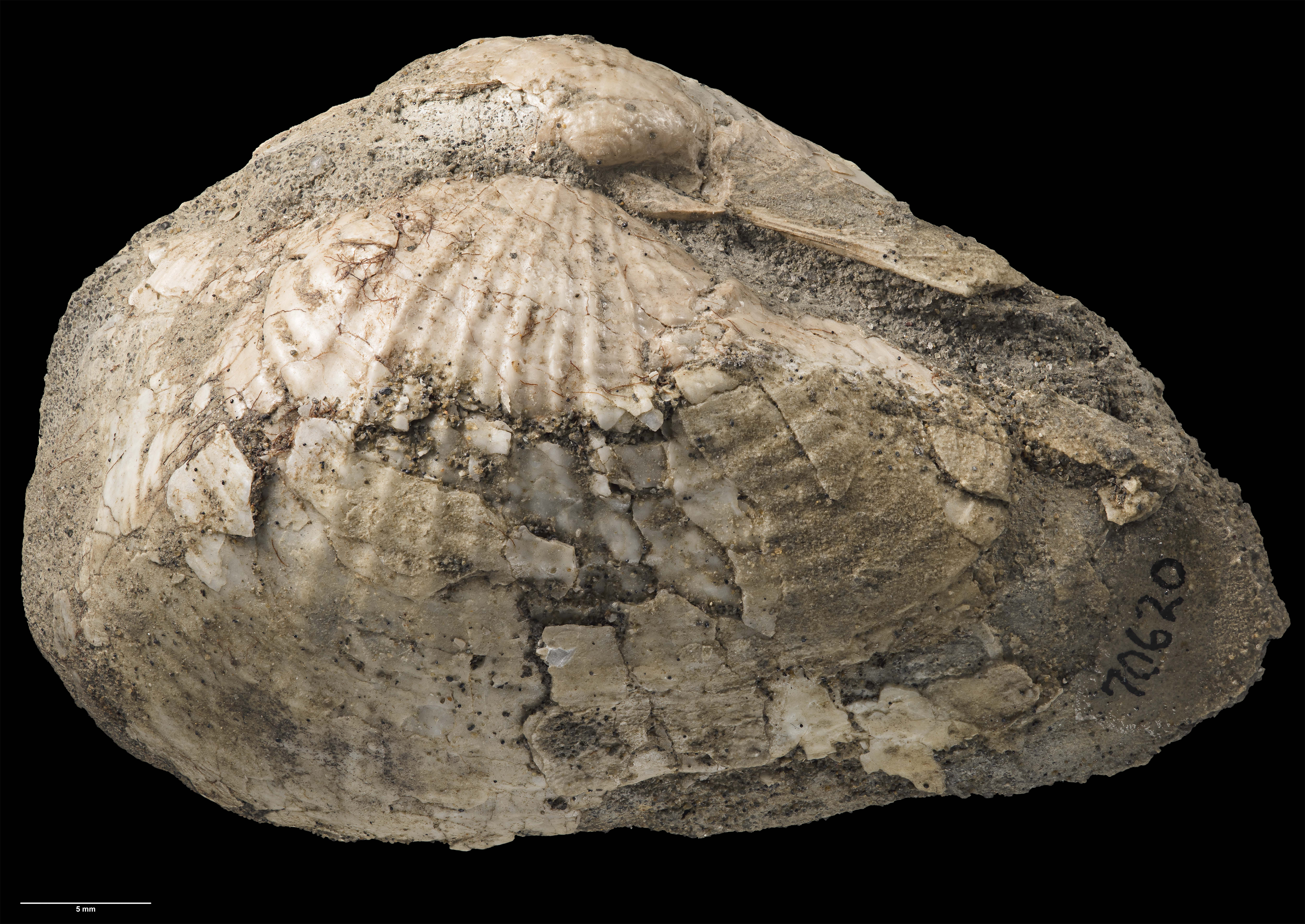
- Holotype from Auckland War Memorial Museum

Scientific classification
- Kingdom: Animalia
- Phylum: Mollusca
- Class: Bivalvia
- Family: Parilimyidae
- Genus: Parilimya
- Species: P. waitotarana

Binomial name
- Parilimya waitotarana (A. W. B. Powell, 1931)

Synonyms
- Pholadomya waitotarana A. W. B. Powell, 1931

= Parilimya waitotarana =

Parilimya waitotarana Temporal range: 3.00–Recent Ma

Species of bivalve

Parilimya waitotarana is a species of bivalve, a marine mollusc in the family Parilimyidae. Fossils of the species date to late Pliocene strata of the Waipipi Formation in New Zealand.

== Description ==
In the original description, Powell described the species as follows:

Shell elongate-oval, cuneate, moderately inequilateral. Umbones situated at a little in front of the middle. Anterior end short and flattened, with a slight ridge running from the base of the flattened area to the umbonal region. Posterior end produced and. attenuated. Shell substance typical; thin and nacreous. Sculpture consisting of simple, distant, slender, radiate ribs, which are confined to the median portion of the valves. The ribs are twelve in number, the first, which is the strongest, being situated at a little behind the anterior fold, after which the ribs diminish in strength. The whole shell is crossed by irregularly developed concentric growth folds. The only specimen is badly crushed and in consequence the right valve appears to overlap the left, but normally the valves would be equal and the umbones level. However, the left valve has escaped distortion and presents the normal outline.

The holotype of the species has a height of 29 mm (1.1 in), a length of 53 mm (2.1 in), and a thickness of 11.5 mm (0.45 in) for a single valve (left). It can be distinguished from P. maoria due to having weaker radial costae and a more concave ventral margin.

== Taxonomy ==
The species was first described by A. W. B. Powell in 1931, who named the species Pholadomya waitotarana. Alan G. Beu and Phillip A. Maxwell provisionally placed the species in Parilimya in 1990, however suggested a new genus may be necessary for the species. The holotype was collected in January 1931 from Waipipi near the mouth of the Wairoa Stream, Waverley, South Taranaki, and is held in the collections of Auckland War Memorial Museum.

== Ecology ==
The species is likely to have lived in the Littoral and Neritic zones off the coast of New Zealand.

== Distribution ==
This extinct marine species occurs in late Pliocene strata of the Waipipi Formation in New Zealand. Fossils of the species have been found near Waverley, South Taranaki, and from Mangaone Crossing in the Wairoa District.
