= Africotriton kilburni =

Scientific classification
- Kingdom: Animalia
- Phylum: Mollusca
- Class: Gastropoda
- Subclass: Caenogastropoda
- Order: Neogastropoda
- Family: Cancellariidae
- Genus: Africotriton
- Species: A. kilburni

Binomial name
- Africotriton kilburni Beu & Maxwell, 1987
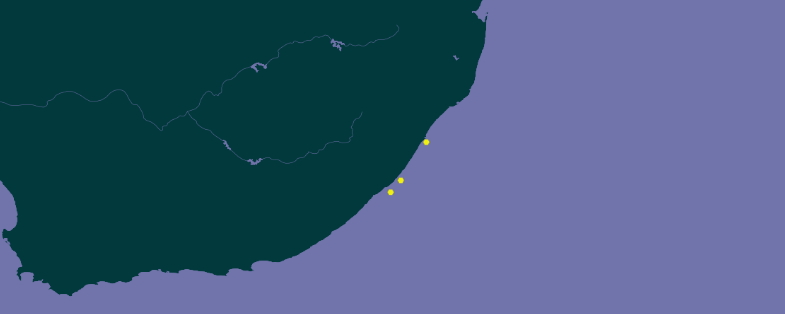

Species of gastropod

Africotriton kilburni is a species of sea snail, a marine gastropod mollusk in the family Cancellariidae, the nutmeg snails.

== Distribution ==
This marine species occurs off Port Alfred, South Africa.
