= Pisanella =

Scientific classification
- Kingdom: Animalia
- Phylum: Mollusca
- Class: Gastropoda
- Subclass: Caenogastropoda
- Order: Neogastropoda
- Family: Cancellariidae
- Genus: Pisanella; Koenen, 1865

Genus of gastropods

Pisanella is a genus of sea snails, marine gastropod mollusks in the family Cancellariidae, the nutmeg snails.

== Species ==
Species within the genus Pisanella include:

- Pisanella antiquata (Hinds, 1844): synonym of Tritonoharpa antiquata
