= Tritonoharpa brunnea =

Scientific classification
- Kingdom: Animalia
- Phylum: Mollusca
- Class: Gastropoda
- Subclass: Caenogastropoda
- Order: Neogastropoda
- Family: Cancellariidae
- Genus: Tritonoharpa
- Species: T. brunnea

Binomial name
- Tritonoharpa brunnea Beu & Maxwell, 1987

Species of gastropod

Tritonoharpa brunnea is a species of sea snail, a marine gastropod mollusk in the family Cancellariidae, the nutmeg snails.
