= Liotina turua =

Scientific classification
- Kingdom: Animalia
- Phylum: Mollusca
- Class: Gastropoda
- Subclass: Vetigastropoda
- Order: Trochida
- Superfamily: Trochoidea
- Family: Liotiidae
- Subfamily: Liotiinae
- Genus: Liotina
- Species: †L. turua

Binomial name
- †Liotina turua Maxwell, 1978

Extinct species of gastropod

Liotina turua is an extinct species of sea snail, a marine gastropod mollusk, in the family Liotiidae.

== Distribution ==
This species occurs in New Zealand.
