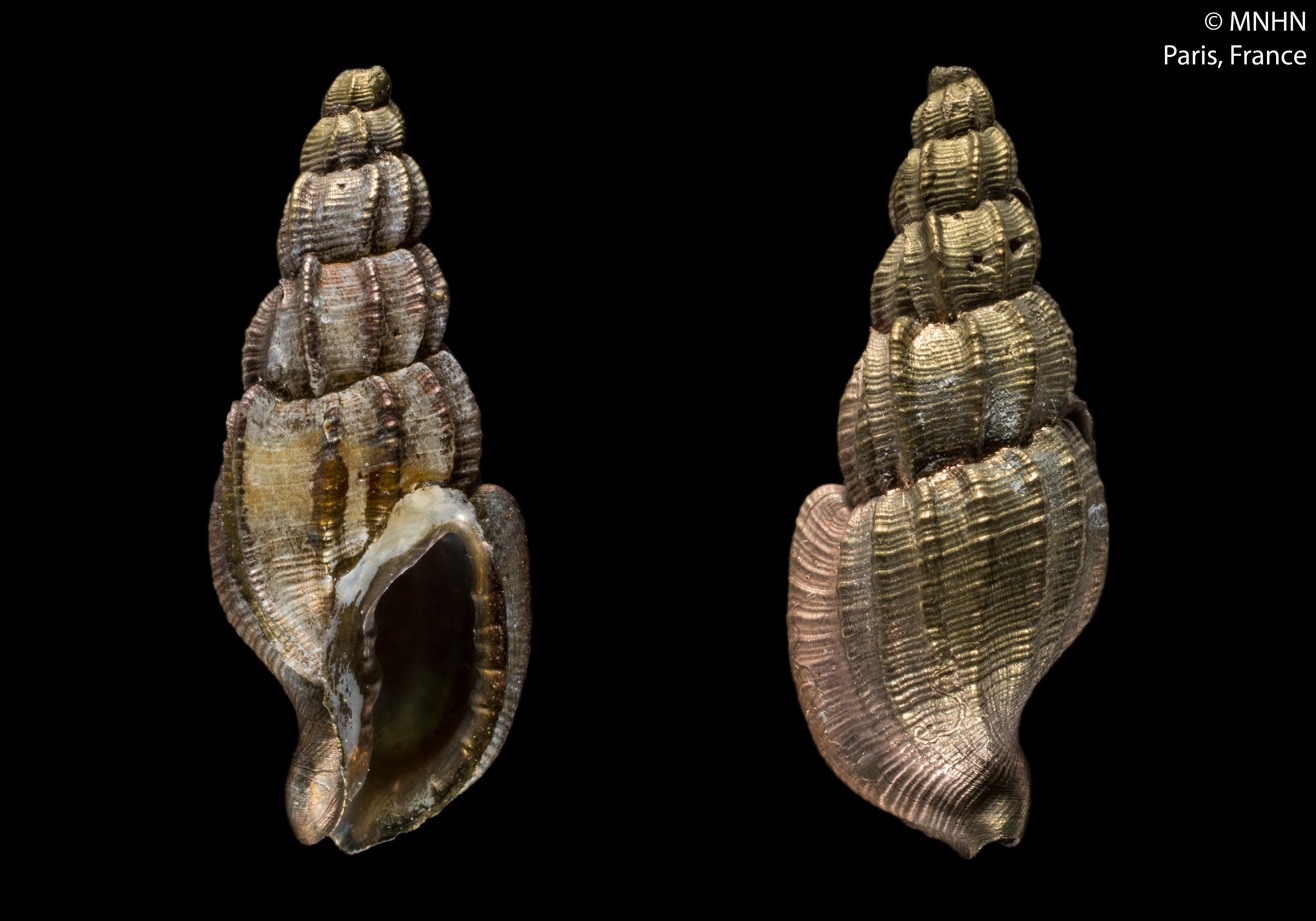

Scientific classification
- Kingdom: Animalia
- Phylum: Mollusca
- Class: Gastropoda
- Subclass: Caenogastropoda
- Order: Neogastropoda
- Family: Cancellariidae
- Genus: Tritonoharpa
- Species: T. boucheti

Binomial name
- Tritonoharpa boucheti Beu & Maxwell, 1987

= Tritonoharpa boucheti =

Species of gastropod

Tritonoharpa boucheti is a species of sea snail, a marine gastropod mollusk in the family Cancellariidae, the nutmeg snails.

== Distribution ==
This marine species occurs off Mozambique.
