= Africotriton petiti =

Scientific classification
- Kingdom: Animalia
- Phylum: Mollusca
- Class: Gastropoda
- Subclass: Caenogastropoda
- Order: Neogastropoda
- Family: Cancellariidae
- Genus: Africotriton
- Species: A. petiti

Binomial name
- Africotriton petiti Beu & Maxwell, 1987
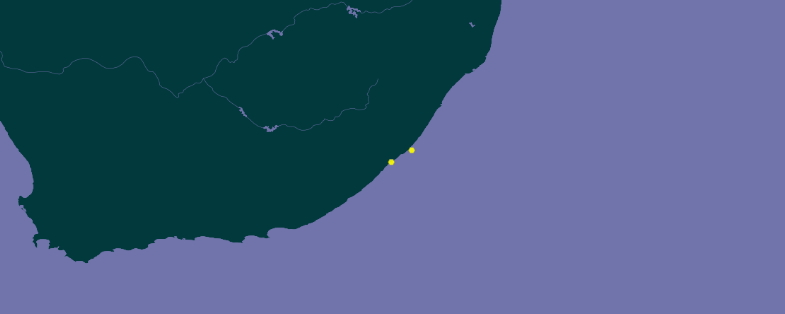

Species of gastropod

Africotriton petiti is a species of sea snail, a marine gastropod mollusk in the family Cancellariidae, the nutmeg snails.

== Distribution ==
This marine species occurs off Kwazulu-Natal, South Africa.
