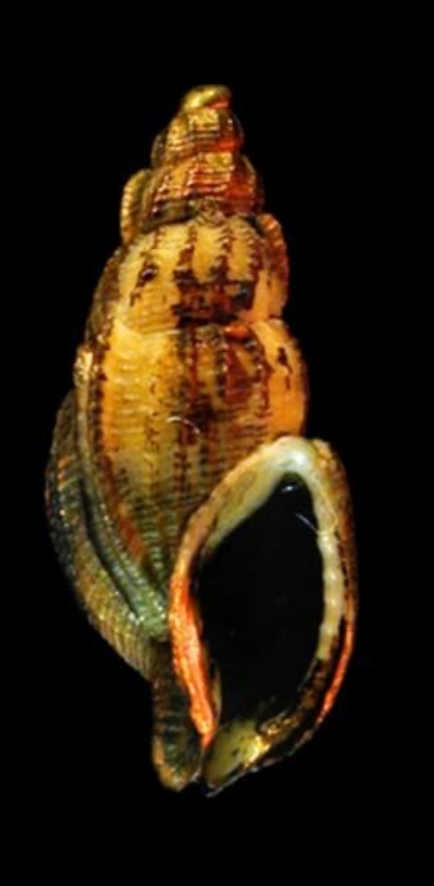
- Shell of Africotriton carinapex (holotype at the Australian Museum)

Scientific classification
- Kingdom: Animalia
- Phylum: Mollusca
- Class: Gastropoda
- Subclass: Caenogastropoda
- Order: Neogastropoda
- Family: Cancellariidae
- Genus: Africotriton
- Species: A. carinapex

Binomial name
- Africotriton carinapex Beu & Maxwell, 1987

= Africotriton carinapex =

Species of gastropod

Africotriton carinapex is a species of sea snail, a marine gastropod mollusk in the family Cancellariidae, the nutmeg snails.

== Description ==
The length of the shell attains 11.7 mm.

== Distribution ==
It is found off the coast of New South Wales, Australia.
