= Tritonoharpa pseudangasi =

Scientific classification
- Kingdom: Animalia
- Phylum: Mollusca
- Class: Gastropoda
- Subclass: Caenogastropoda
- Order: Neogastropoda
- Family: Cancellariidae
- Genus: Tritonoharpa
- Species: T. pseudangasi

Binomial name
- Tritonoharpa pseudangasi Beu & Maxwell, 1987

Species of gastropod

Tritonoharpa pseudangasi is a species of sea snail, a marine gastropod mollusk in the family Cancellariidae, the nutmeg snails.
