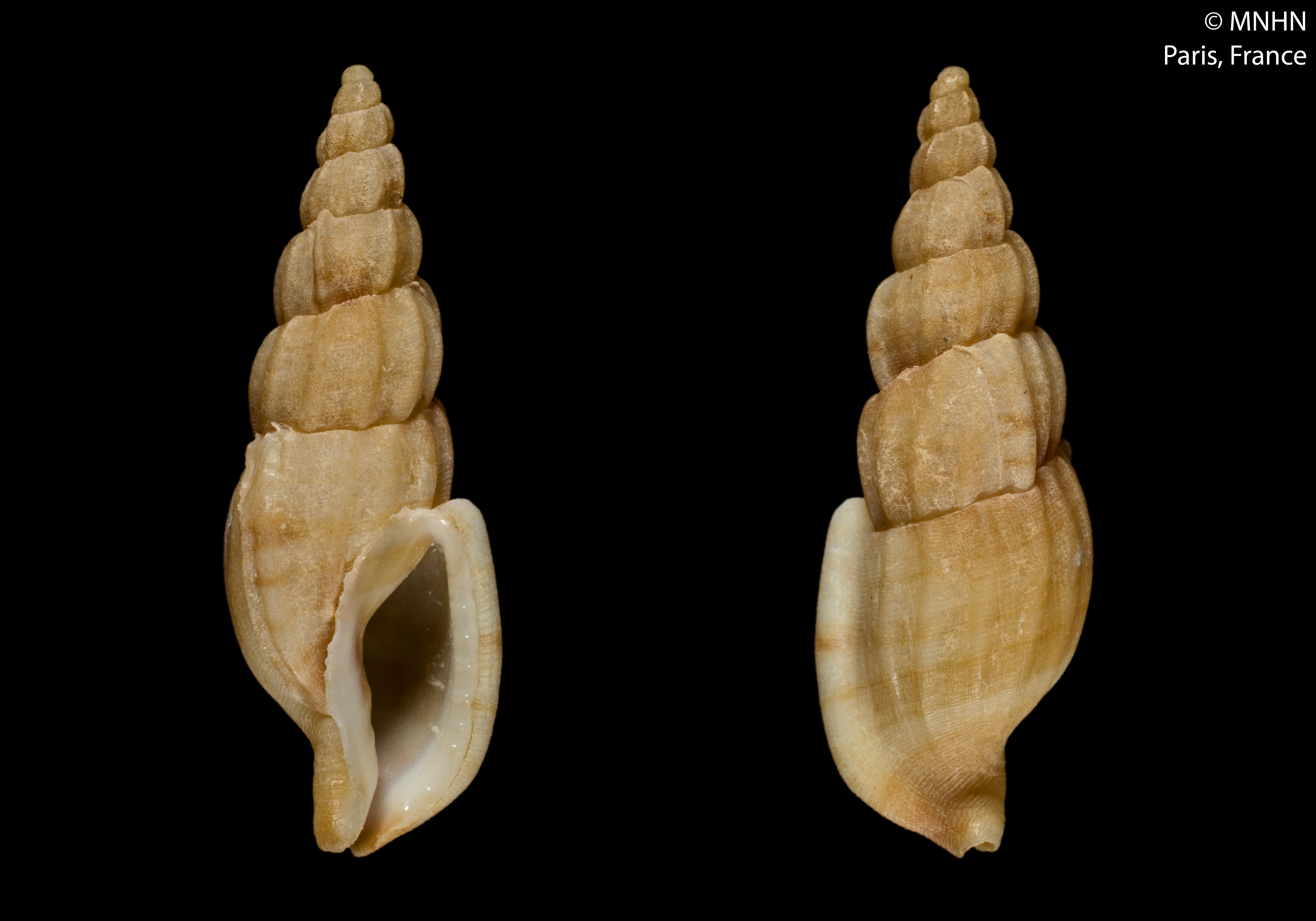
- Shell of Africotriton adelphum (holotype at MNHN, Paris)

Scientific classification
- Kingdom: Animalia
- Phylum: Mollusca
- Class: Gastropoda
- Subclass: Caenogastropoda
- Order: Neogastropoda
- Family: Cancellariidae
- Genus: Africotriton
- Species: A. adelphum

Binomial name
- Africotriton adelphum Bouchet & Petit, 2002

= Africotriton adelphum =

Species of gastropod

Africotriton adelphum is a species of sea snail, a marine gastropod mollusc in the family Cancellariidae, the nutmeg snails.

== Description ==
The length of the shell attains 22.4 mm. It is a benthic organism typically predatory in nature.

== Distribution ==
This marine species occurs off New Caledonia, Ile des Pins.
