= Liotina crassibasis =

- Original drawing of a shell of Liotina crassibasis

Scientific classification
- Kingdom: Animalia
- Phylum: Mollusca
- Class: Gastropoda
- Subclass: Vetigastropoda
- Order: Trochida
- Superfamily: Trochoidea
- Family: Liotiidae
- Subfamily: Liotiinae
- Genus: Liotina
- Species: L. crassibasis

Binomial name
- Liotina crassibasis (E. A. Smith, 1880)

Synonyms
- Liotia crassibasis E.A. Smith, 1880 (original description); Liotina crassibassis [sic]

Species of gastropod

Liotina crassibasis is a species of small sea snail, a marine gastropod mollusk, in the family Liotiidae.

== Description ==
The height of the shell attains 12 mm, its diameter 14 mm. The solid, white shell is umbilicate. The spire is short and depressed at the apex. The shell contains 4 whorls. The aperture is circular.

This is a remarkably sculptured shell and very peculiar in form. The upper whorls and half the last one are flattened at the top, and scarcely slope at all. The last half of the body whorl, however, upon which the plicae become very much larger than those above, is a little convex. The lines of growth are elevated, excessively close together, and cover the entire surface of the shell, being continuous upon the keels and lirae and in the interstices between them. The plicae are somewhat acuminately produced upon the upper carina, which, when viewed from above, presents a prettily festooned appearance. The immense thickening at the base of the body whorl is very remarkable, and forms an excessively thick base to the aperture. Between this thickening and the lower keel the whorl is a little constricted or concave, especially so towards the mouth. And in this part the transverse liras, about twelve in number, are finely granulose. The plicae do not extend below the keels, nor do they interrupt the spiral lirae, the latter being continuous on and between them.

== Distribution ==
This marine species occurs off Western Australia and Vietnam.
