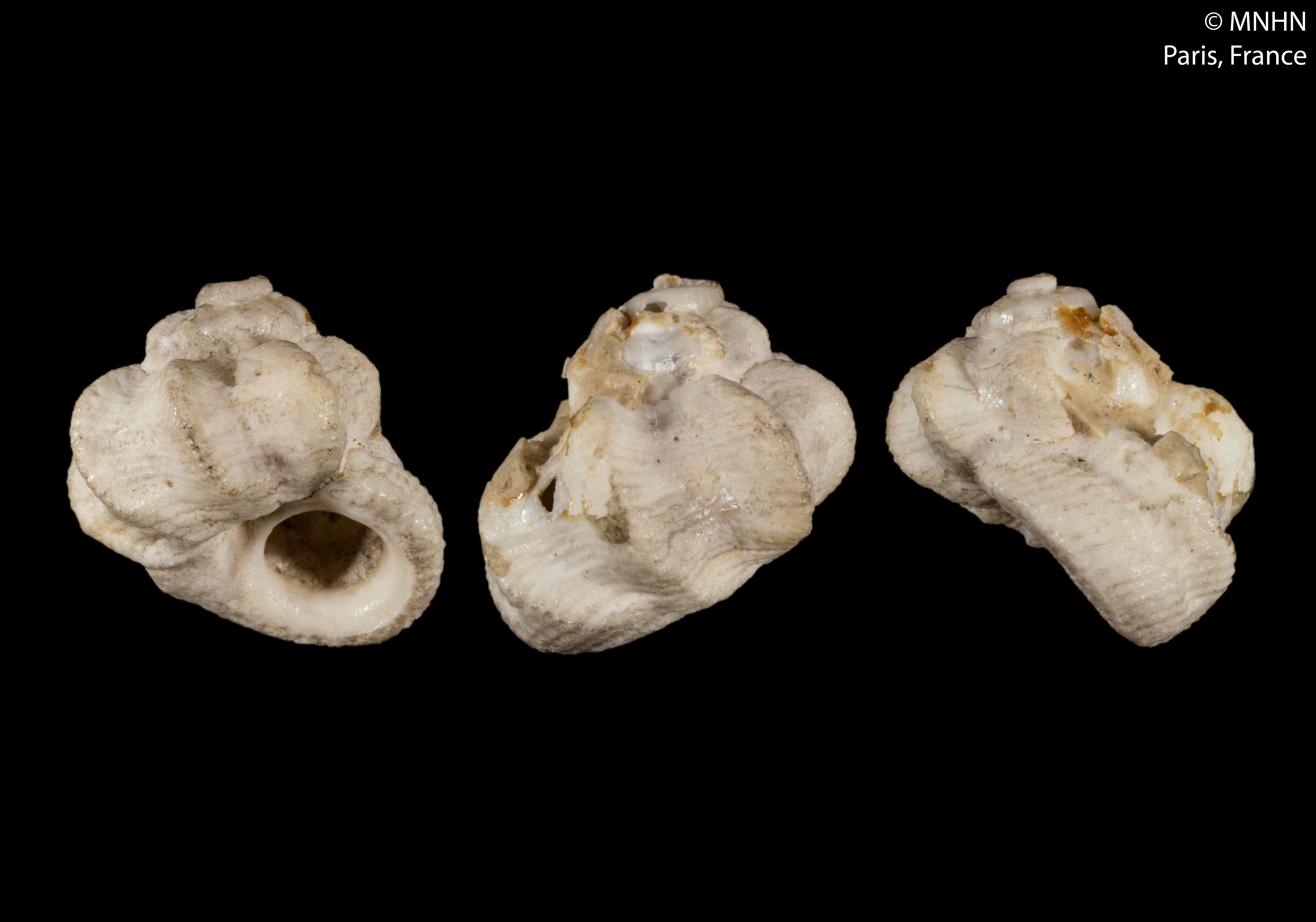
- Shell of Liotinaria scalarioides

Scientific classification
- Kingdom: Animalia
- Phylum: Mollusca
- Class: Gastropoda
- Subclass: Vetigastropoda
- Order: Trochida
- Superfamily: Trochoidea
- Family: Liotiidae
- Genus: Liotinaria; Habe, 1955

Synonyms
- Liotina (Liotinaria) Habe, 1955 (original rank)

= Liotinaria =

Genus of gastropods

Liotinaria is a genus of sea snails, marine gastropod mollusks, in the family Liotiidae.

== Species ==
Species within the genus Liotinaria include:

- Liotinaria peronii (Kiener, 1838)
- Liotinaria scalarioides (Reeve, 1843)
- Liotinaria semiclathratula (Schrenck, 1862)
- Liotinaria solidula (Gould, 1859)
