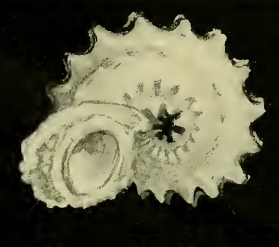
- Original drawing of a shell of Liotina cycloma

Scientific classification
- Kingdom: Animalia
- Phylum: Mollusca
- Class: Gastropoda
- Subclass: Vetigastropoda
- Order: Trochida
- Superfamily: Trochoidea
- Family: Liotiidae
- Subfamily: Liotiinae
- Genus: Liotina
- Species: L. cycloma

Binomial name
- Liotina cycloma Tomlin, 1918

Synonyms
- Dentarene cycloma (Tomlin, J.R. le B., 1918)

= Liotina cycloma =

Species of gastropod

Liotina cycloma is a species of small sea snail, a marine gastropod mollusk, in the family Liotiidae.

== Description ==
(Original description by J.R. le B. Tomlin) The height of the shell attains 4 mm, its diameter 7.5 mm. The solid, white shell has a subdiscoidal shape. It is slightly convex above. The umbilicus is narrow, but open to the apex. The shell contains 5½ whorls that increase rapidly in size, with a smooth protoconch of 1½ whorls. The rest of the shell is sculptured with very fine, closely packed axial lamellae. There are six spiral cords— one immediately below the suture, ornamented with a series of numerous sharp-pointed cogs, one on the shoulder of the whorl bearing blunt tubercles, which more or less correspond to the cogs above, two very strong ones on the periphery, one tubercled cord below the periphery, and one cogged cord at the margin of the umbilicus. The peripheral cords are connected at regular intervals of about half-a-millimetre by solid, strongly-raised cross pieces, which are more or less M-shaped if the shell be viewed edgewise and are rather suggestive of the endless chain of buckets on a steam-dredger. The supra-peripheral cord gradually disappears in ascending the spire. The aperture is circular, guarded by a strong outstanding varix, on which the spiral cords appear as simple or occasionally bifid ridges.

== Distribution ==
This marine species occurs off the Philippines.
