= Liotina montamarina =

Scientific classification
- Kingdom: Animalia
- Phylum: Mollusca
- Class: Gastropoda
- Subclass: Vetigastropoda
- Order: Trochida
- Family: Liotiidae
- Genus: Liotina
- Species: L. montamarina

Binomial name
- Liotina montamarina Okutani, 2001

Species of gastropod

Liotina montamarina is a species of sea snail, a marine gastropod mollusk in the family Liotiidae.

== Distribution ==
This marine species occurs off Japan.
