= Tritonoharpa bayeri =

Scientific classification
- Kingdom: Animalia
- Phylum: Mollusca
- Class: Gastropoda
- Subclass: Caenogastropoda
- Order: Neogastropoda
- Family: Cancellariidae
- Genus: Tritonoharpa
- Species: T. bayeri

Binomial name
- Tritonoharpa bayeri (Petuch, 1987)

Synonyms
- Colubraria bayeri Petuch, 1987

Species of gastropod

Tritonoharpa bayeri is a species of sea snail, a marine gastropod mollusk in the family Cancellariidae, the nutmeg snails.

== Description ==
Original description: "Shell small for genus, very thin and fragile, inflated, bullate; spire low in comparison to cogeners, shoulder and spire tabulate; 2 very thin, bladelike, low varices per whorl; 16-18 very narrow, low, axial riblets between sets of varices; axial riblets overlaid with numerous raised spiral threads; parietal shield erect, nonadherent; edge of lip thin, bladelike, crenulated; color pale tan with numerous large, scattered, amorphous reddish-brown patches; varices marked with one large medial reddish-brown checker-shaped flammule and smaller brown dashes; interior of aperture pale tan, with brown checkers of labial varix showing through."

== Distribution ==
Locus typicus: "Off Cabo La Vela, Goajira Peninsula, Colombia."
