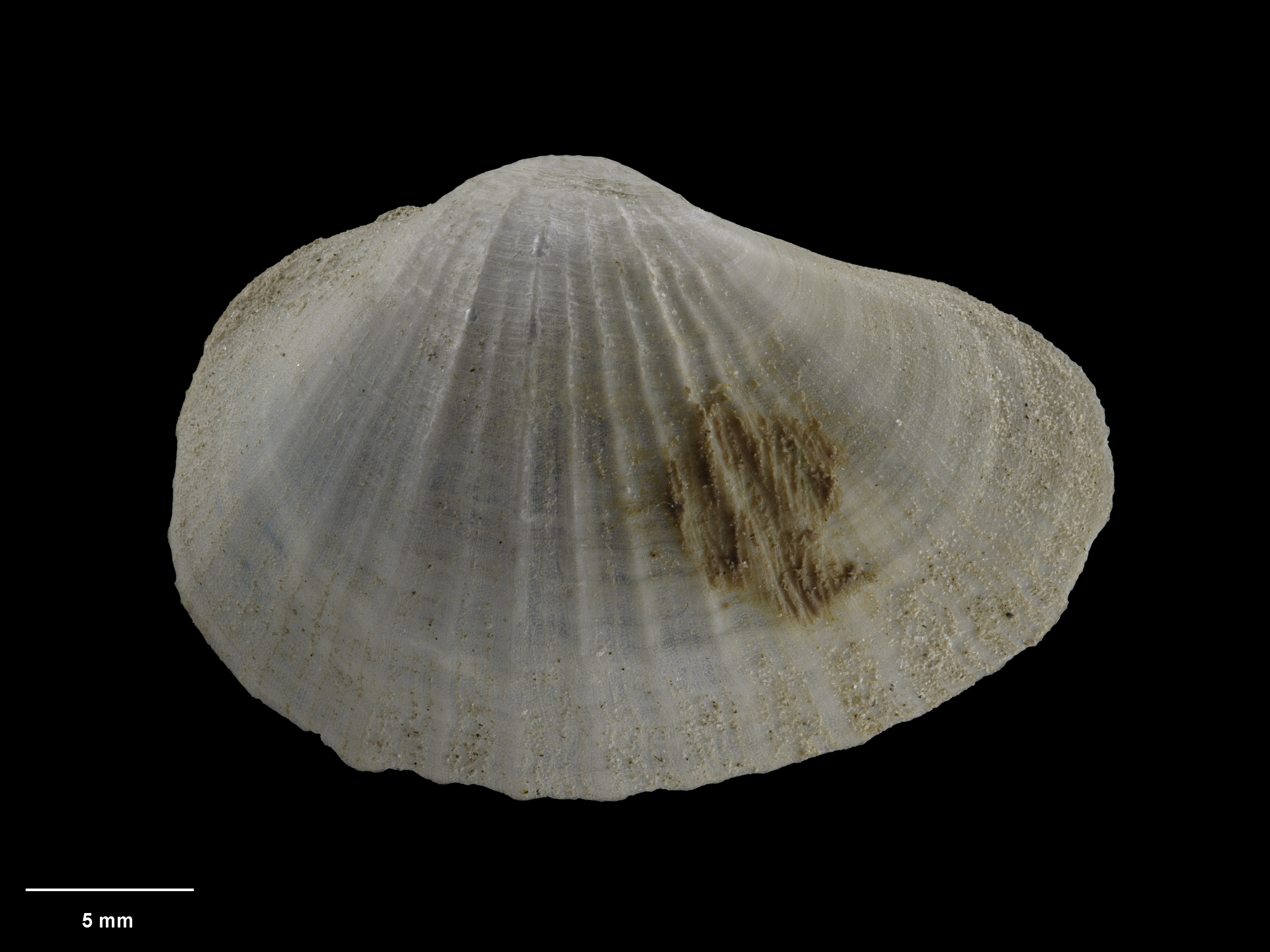
- Parilimya maoria

Scientific classification
- Kingdom: Animalia
- Phylum: Mollusca
- Class: Bivalvia
- Family: Parilimyidae
- Genus: Parilimya

Type species
- Pholadomya (Parilimya) haddoni Melvill & Standen, 1899

Synonyms
- Nipponopanacca Habe, 1977; Pholadomya (Parilimya) Melvill & Standen, 1899

= Parilimya =

Parilimya Temporal range: Miocene–Recent

Genus of bivalves

Parilimya is a genus of marine bivalve molluscs of the family Parilimyidae. Globally distributed, fossils of the genus date back to at least the Miocene.

== Description ==
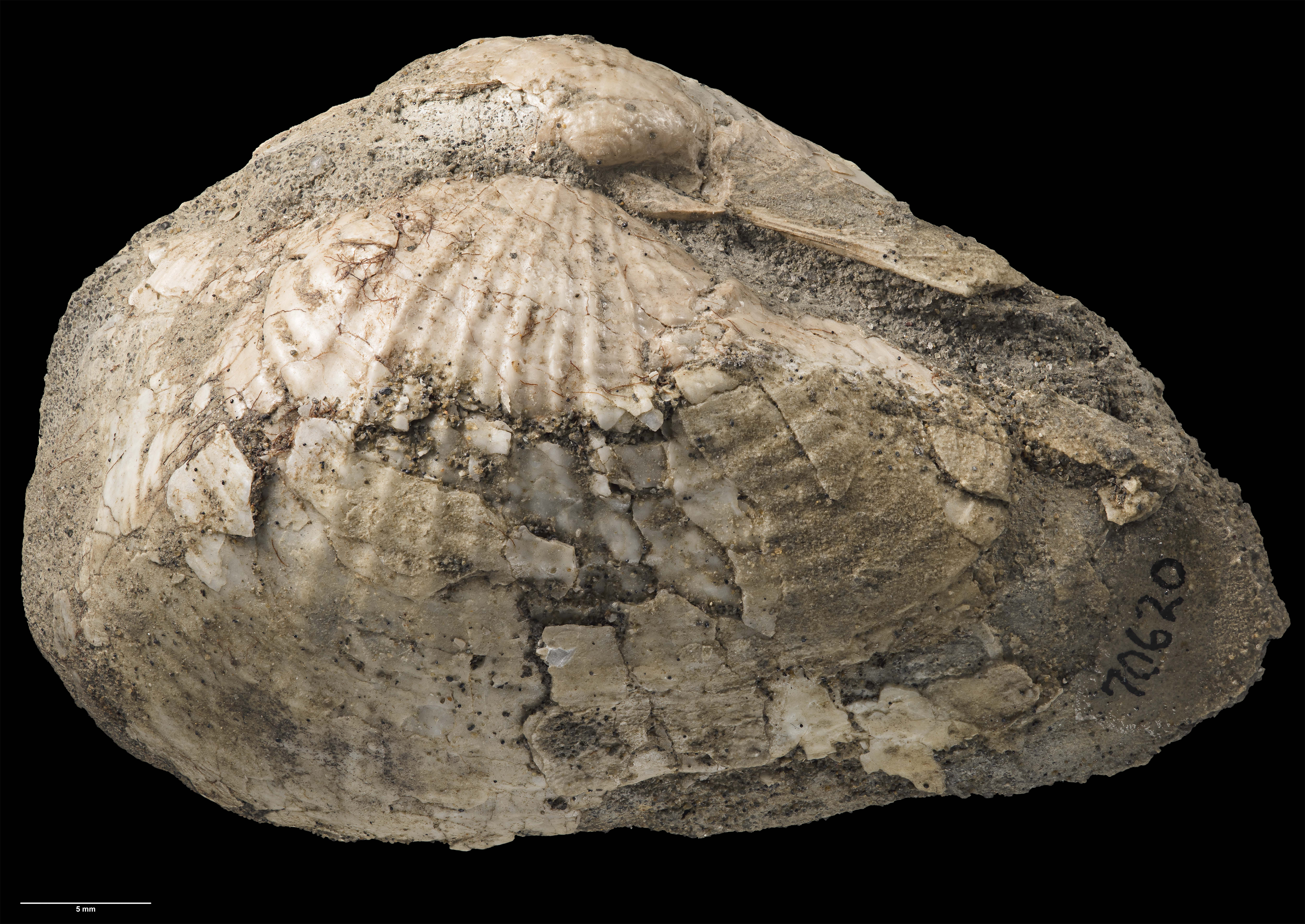
P. waitotarana

Members of the genus have shells that range from ovate to ovate-elongate, without a sinuous anterior margin. Numerous fine radial ribs is a feature commonly seen in Parilimya.

== Taxonomy ==
The genus was first described in 1899 by James Cosmo Melvill and Robert Standen, as a subgenus of Pholadomya. In 1982, a new family was erected for the genus, Parilimyidae.

== Distribution ==
Members of the genus have been found in the North Atlantic Ocean, the Torres Strait, Japan, the western Pacific Ocean, and New Zealand. Fossils of the genus have been found in Japan and New Zealand, dating to the Miocene.

== Species ==
Species within the genus Parilimya include:

- Parilimya fragilis (Grieg, 1920)
- Parilimya haddoni (Melvill & Standen, 1899)
- Parilimya levicaudata (Matsukuma, 1989)
- Parilimya loveni (Jeffreys, 1882)
- Parilimya maoria (Dell, 1963)
- Parilimya neozelanica (Suter, 1914)
- Parilimya pacifica (Dall, 1907)
- Parilimya sinica (F.-S. Xu, 1992)
- † Parilimya waitotarana (A. W. B. Powell, 1931)
- † Parilimya warrenae (Dell, 1952)
