= Liotina tantilla =

Scientific classification
- Kingdom: Animalia
- Phylum: Mollusca
- Class: Gastropoda
- Subclass: Vetigastropoda
- Order: Trochida
- Superfamily: Trochoidea
- Family: Liotiidae
- Subfamily: Liotiinae
- Genus: Liotina
- Species: L. tantilla

Binomial name
- Liotina tantilla A. Adams, 1863

Synonyms
- Liotina (Liotinaria) tantilla (A. Adams, 1863)

Species of gastropod

Liotina tantilla is a species of small sea snail, a marine gastropod mollusk, in the family Liotiidae.

== Description ==
The small, thick, white shell has a discoid shape and is deeply umbilicate. It contains 3½ convex whorls with concentric, grooved furrows. The last whorls has a rounded shape at the periphery. The umbilicus is of a moderate size. The aperture is circular.

== Distribution ==
This marine species occurs off Japan.
