= Tritonoharpa coxi =

Scientific classification
- Kingdom: Animalia
- Phylum: Mollusca
- Class: Gastropoda
- Subclass: Caenogastropoda
- Order: Neogastropoda
- Family: Cancellariidae
- Genus: Tritonoharpa
- Species: T. coxi

Binomial name
- Tritonoharpa coxi (Brazier, 1872)

Synonyms
- Triton coxi Brazier, 1872

Species of gastropod

Tritonoharpa coxi is a species of sea snail, a marine gastropod mollusk in the family Cancellariidae, the nutmeg snails.
