= Africotriton fictilis =

Scientific classification
- Kingdom: Animalia
- Phylum: Mollusca
- Class: Gastropoda
- Subclass: Caenogastropoda
- Order: Neogastropoda
- Family: Cancellariidae
- Genus: Africotriton
- Species: A. fictilis

Binomial name
- Africotriton fictilis (Hinds, 1844a)
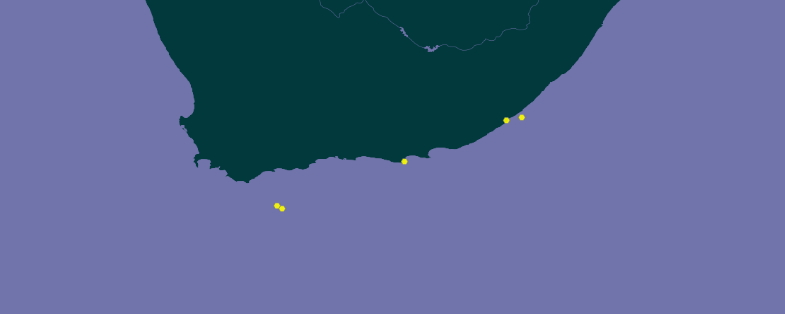

Synonyms
- Colubraria fictilis (Hinds, 1844); Nivitriton fictilis (Hinds, 1844) ·; Triton fictilis Hinds, 1844a

Species of gastropod

Africotriton fictilis is a species of sea snail, a marine gastropod mollusc in the family Cancellariidae, the nutmeg snails.

== Description ==
The length of the shell attains 21 mm.

(Original description in Latin) The solid, ovate shell has a gray color. The whorls are rounded with longitudinal, obliquely folded ribs and narrow transverse striae. The spirals barely extend beyond the aperture, which is polished, deep, and smoothed with a contracted callous opening.

== Distribution ==
This marine species occurs off the Agulhas Bank, South Africa.
