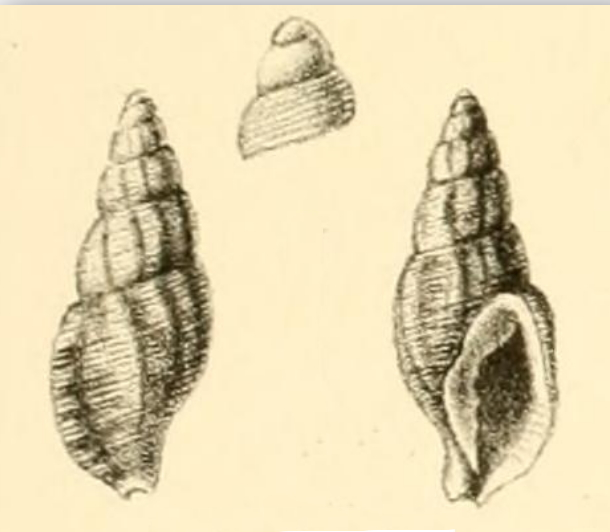
- Shell of Africotriton crebriliratus (holotype)

Scientific classification
- Kingdom: Animalia
- Phylum: Mollusca
- Class: Gastropoda
- Subclass: Caenogastropoda
- Order: Neogastropoda
- Family: Cancellariidae
- Genus: Africotriton
- Species: A. crebriliratus

Binomial name
- Africotriton crebriliratus (G.B. Sowerby III, 1903)

Synonyms
- Colubraria crebrilirata (G. B. Sowerby III, 1903) ·; Epidromus crebriliratus G.B. Sowerby III, 1903

= Africotriton crebriliratus =

Species of gastropod

Africotriton crebriliratus is a species of sea snail, a marine gastropod mollusk in the family Cancellariidae, the nutmeg snails.

== Description ==
The length of the shell attains 14 mm, its diameter 5 mm.

(Original description) The shell is narrowly oblong, with a fulvous hue. It is faintly banded and variegated with brown, becoming pearly white at the apex. The spire is elongately acuminated, slightly convex at the sides. There are 5½ whorls, with the first 1½ whorls smooth and shining, and the subsequent whorls rather convex, irregularly plicate, and varicose.

The shell is spirally finely grooved, and the suture is scarcely impressed. The body whorl is oblong, with rather straight sides and a very short rostrum at the base. The aperture is rather wide in the middle and narrow at each end. The columella is covered with a thin white callus that stands erect over the umbilical region, slightly and irregularly pustulate. The siphonal canal is short, narrow, and slightly recurved.

== Distribution ==
This marine species occurs off Port Alfred, South Africa.
