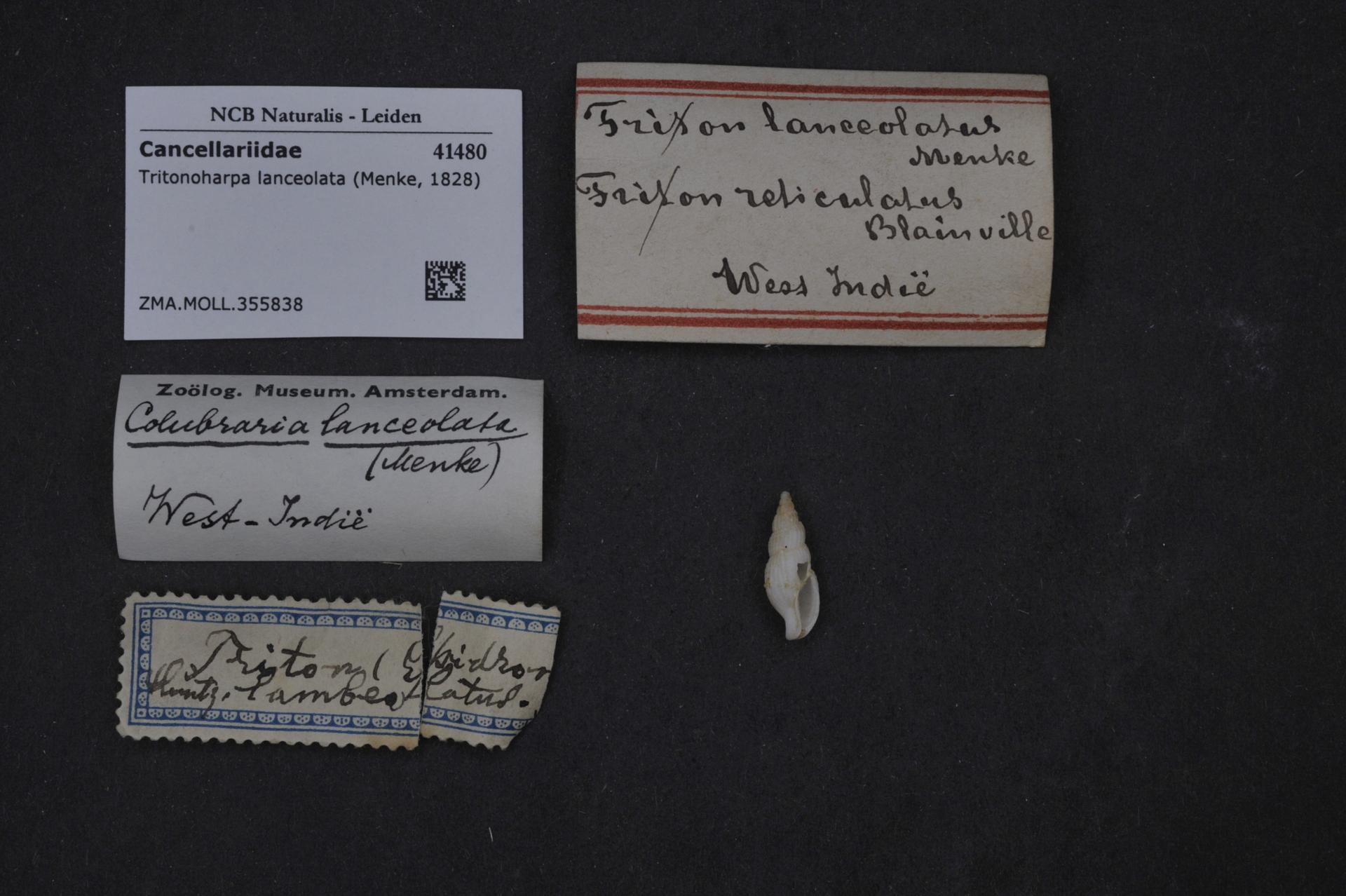
- Tritonoharpa lanceolata (Menke, 1828) – Cancellariidae – Mollusc shell

Scientific classification
- Kingdom: Animalia
- Phylum: Mollusca
- Class: Gastropoda
- Subclass: Caenogastropoda
- Order: Neogastropoda
- Family: Cancellariidae
- Genus: Tritonoharpa
- Species: T. lanceolata

Binomial name
- Tritonoharpa lanceolata (Menke, 1828)

Synonyms
- Ranella lanceolata Menke, 1828; Colubraria aclinica Tucker & Wilson, 1933 †; Colubraria leona Mansfield, 1937 †

= Tritonoharpa lanceolata =

Species of gastropod

Tritonoharpa lanceolata is a species of sea snail, a marine gastropod mollusk in the family Cancellariidae, the nutmeg snails.

== Description ==
These mollusks inhabit a conical spiral shell no more than 38 mm in length.

== Distribution ==
Tritonoharpa lanceolata can be found along the coast-line of the south-eastern United States from North Carolina to Florida. It is also found along the shores of the Gulf of Mexico and the islands of the Caribbean Sea. They are found mostly in shallow waters near the coast usually between 1 m and 18 m in depth.
