= Liotina hermanni =

Scientific classification
- Kingdom: Animalia
- Phylum: Mollusca
- Class: Gastropoda
- Subclass: Vetigastropoda
- Order: Trochida
- Superfamily: Trochoidea
- Family: Liotiidae
- Subfamily: Liotiinae
- Genus: Liotina
- Species: L. hermanni

Binomial name
- Liotina hermanni (Dunker, 1869)

Species of gastropod

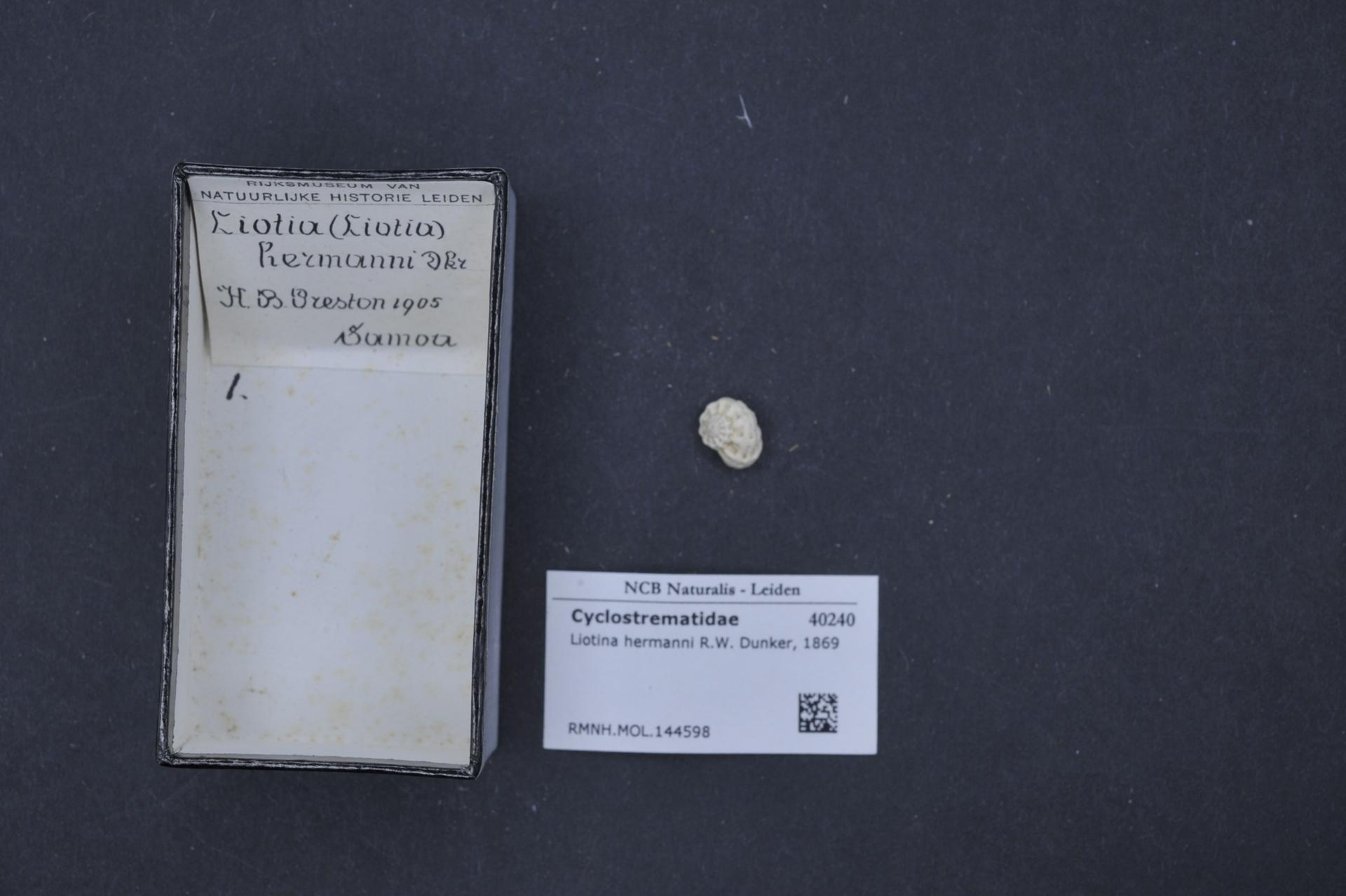
Liotina hermanni R.W. Dunker, 1869

Liotina hermanni is a species of small sea snail, a marine gastropod mollusk, in the family Liotiidae.

== Distribution ==
This marine species occurs off Queensland, Australia
