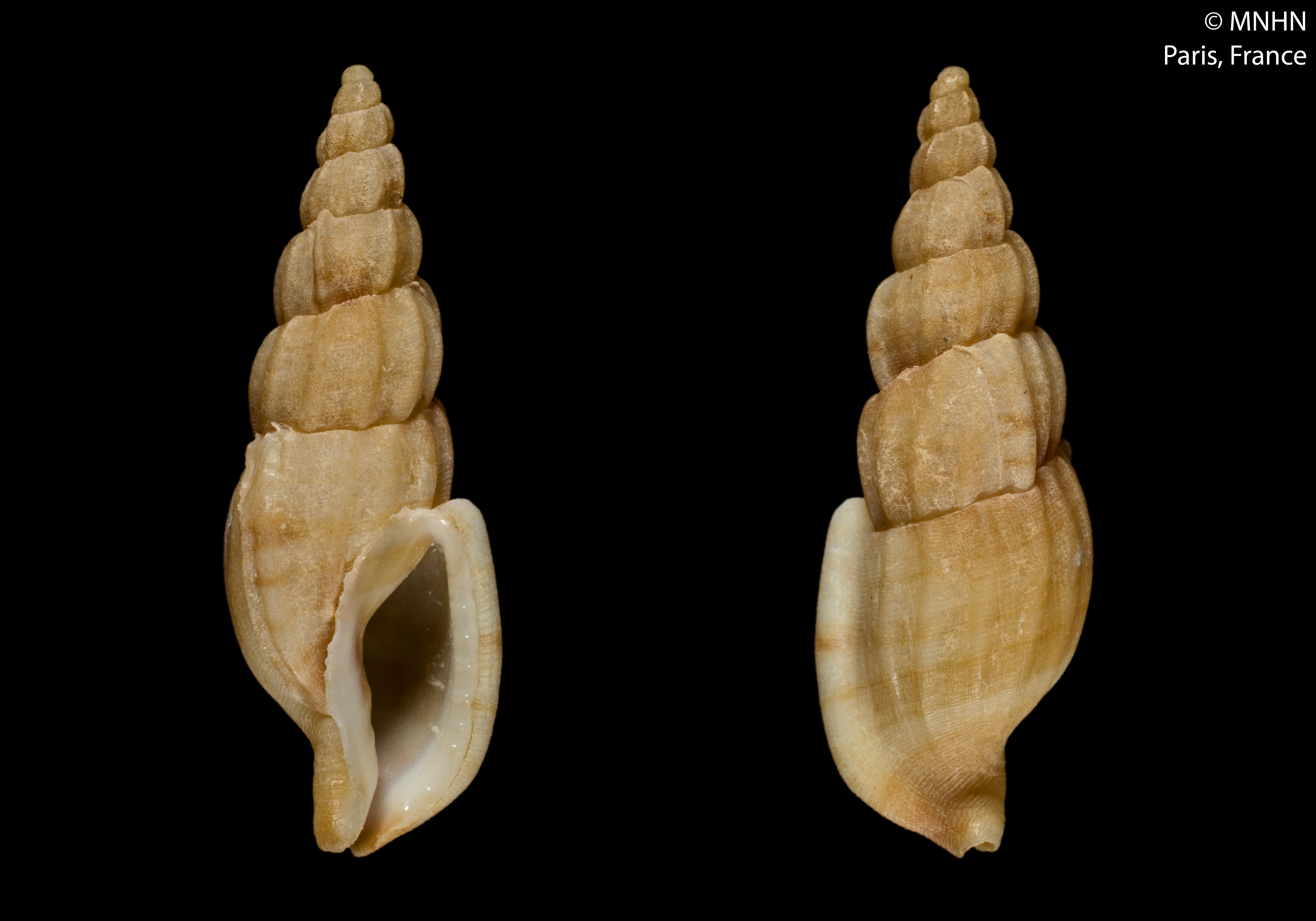
- Shell of Africotriton adelphum

Scientific classification
- Kingdom: Animalia
- Phylum: Mollusca
- Class: Gastropoda
- Subclass: Caenogastropoda
- Order: Neogastropoda
- Superfamily: Volutoidea
- Family: Cancellariidae
- Subfamily: Plesiotritoninae
- Genus: Africotriton; Beu & Marshall, 1987

Type species
- Epidromus crebriliratus G.B. Sowerby III, 1903

Species
- See text

= Africotriton =

Genus of gastropods

Africotriton is a genus of sea snails, marine gastropod mollusks in the subfamily Plesiotritoninae of the family Cancellariidae, the nutmeg snails.

== Species ==
Species within the genus Africotriton include:

- Africotriton adelphum Bouchet & Petit, 2002
- Africotriton carinapex Beu & Maxwell, 1987
- Africotriton crebriliratus (G.B. Sowerby III, 1903)
- Africotriton fictilis (Hinds, 1844a)
- Africotriton kilburni Beu & Maxwell, 1987
- Africotriton multinodulatus Beu & Maxwell, 1987
- Africotriton petiti Beu & Maxwell, 1987
