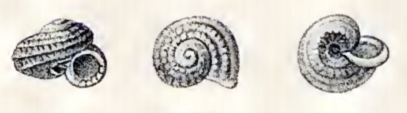
- Drawing with three views of a shell of Liotina semiclathratula

Scientific classification
- Kingdom: Animalia
- Phylum: Mollusca
- Class: Gastropoda
- Subclass: Vetigastropoda
- Order: Trochida
- Superfamily: Trochoidea
- Family: Liotiidae
- Subfamily: Liotiinae
- Genus: Liotina
- Species: L. semiclathratula

Binomial name
- Liotina semiclathratula Schrenck, 1862

= Liotina semiclathratula =

Species of gastropod

Liotina semiclathratula is a species of small sea snail, a marine gastropod mollusk, in the family Liotiidae.

== Description ==
The size of the shell varies between 5 mm and 15 mm. The whitish shell has a depressed turbinate shape. It is spirally costate, with the costae slightly tuberculate above. The suture is channeled. The outer lip is crenately varicose. The large umbilicus is bicarinate within and crenulately margined.

== Distribution ==
This marine species occurs off Japan, the Amur region and the Philippines.

== Notes ==
- Higo, S., Callomon, P. & Goto, Y. (1999). Catalogue and bibliography of the marine shell-bearing Mollusca of Japan. Osaka. : Elle Scientific Publications. 749 pp.
