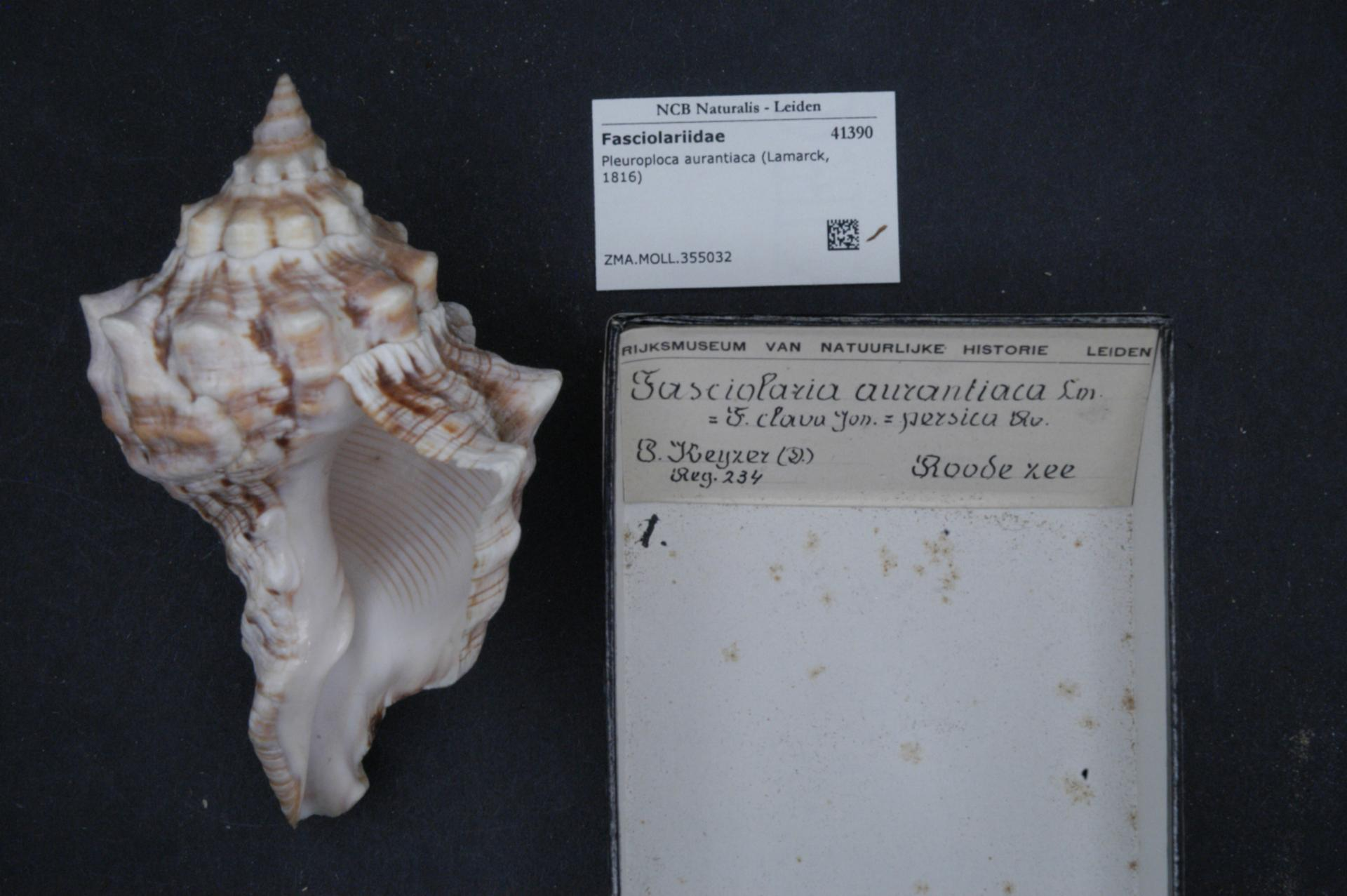

Scientific classification
- Kingdom: Animalia
- Phylum: Mollusca
- Class: Gastropoda
- Subclass: Caenogastropoda
- Order: Neogastropoda
- Superfamily: Volutoidea
- Family: Cancellariidae
- Subfamily: Plesiotritoninae
- Genus: Tritonoharpa; Dall, 1908

Synonyms
- Esbelta Sarasúa, 1975; Nivitriton Iredale, 1929 ·

= Tritonoharpa =

Genus of gastropods

Tritonoharpa is a genus of sea snails, marine gastropod mollusks in the family Cancellariidae, the nutmeg snails.

== Species ==
Species within the genus Tritonoharpa include:

- † Tritonoharpa alanbeui Landau, Harzhauser, İslamoğlu & da Silva, 2013
- Tritonoharpa angasi (Brazier, 1877)
- Tritonoharpa ansonae Beu & Maxwell, 1987
- Tritonoharpa antiquata (Hinds in Reeve, 1844)
- † Tritonoharpa aquitaniensis Lesport, Cluzaud & Verhecken, 2015
- Tritonoharpa aphrogenia (Pilsbry & Lowe, 1932)
- Tritonoharpa basilaevis Beu & Maxwell, 1987
- Tritonoharpa bayeri (Petuch, 1987)
- Tritonoharpa beui Verhecken, 1997
- Tritonoharpa boucheti Beu & Maxwell, 1987
- Tritonoharpa brunnea Beu & Maxwell, 1987
- † Tritonoharpa caunbonensis Pacaud, Ledon & Loubry, 2015
- Tritonoharpa coxi (Brazier, 1872)
- Tritonoharpa cubapatriae (Sarasúa, 1975)
- Tritonoharpa cubapatrie (Sarasúa, 1975)
- Tritonoharpa curvapex Souza, Gomes & P. M. Costa, 2020
- †Tritonoharpa floridensis (H. I. Tucker & D. Wilson, 1932)
- Tritonoharpa indoceana Beu & Maxwell, 1987
- Tritonoharpa janowskyi Petuch & Sargent, 2011
- Tritonoharpa lanceolata (Menke, 1828)
- Tritonoharpa leali Harasewych, Petit & Verhecken, 1992
- † Tritonoharpa mariechristinae Lesport, Cluzaud & Verhecken, 2015
- † Tritonoharpa nodulata (Tate, 1888)
- Tritonoharpa ponderi Beu & Maxwell, 1987
- † Tritonoharpa praetexta (Bellardi, 1872)
- Tritonoharpa pseudangasi Beu & Maxwell, 1987
- † Tritonoharpa renardi Lesport, Cluzaud & Verhecken, 2015
- Tritonoharpa siphonata (Reeve, 1844)
- †Tritonoharpa speciosa (Bellardi, 1872)
- Tritonoharpa vexillata Dall, 1908
- Tritonoharpa westralia Beu & Maxwell, 1987
