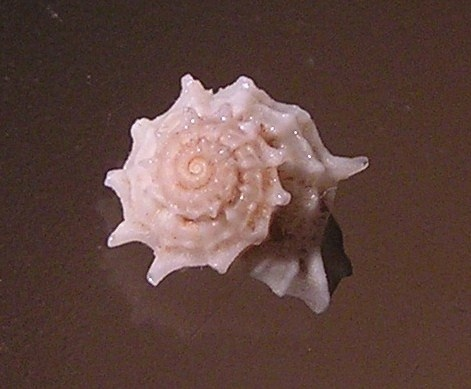
- Liotina crenata

Scientific classification
- Kingdom: Animalia
- Phylum: Mollusca
- Class: Gastropoda
- Subclass: Vetigastropoda
- Order: Trochida
- Family: Liotiidae
- Genus: Liotina
- Species: L. crenata

Binomial name
- Liotina crenata (Kiener, 1839)

Synonyms
- Delphinula crenata Kiener, 1839; Dentarene sarcina Iredale, 1929; Liotia (Arene) crenata Kiener, 1839

= Liotina crenata =

Species of gastropod

Liotina crenata is a species of sea snail, a marine gastropod mollusk in the family Liotiidae.

== Description ==
The diameter of the shell is 15 mm. The depressed shell has a turbinate shape. The spire whorls are somewhat exserted, all showing a pair of peripheral keels, which are strongly, or subsipinosely crenulated. The whorls are encircled by a spiral series of granules above. The base of the shell is smooth. The umbilicus is of a moderate size, defined by a riblet. The peristome is strongly crenately varicose. The color of the shell is whitish, stained with chestnut.

== Distribution ==
This species occurs in the Indian Ocean off the Aldabra Atoll; in the Pacific Ocean off the Philippines.

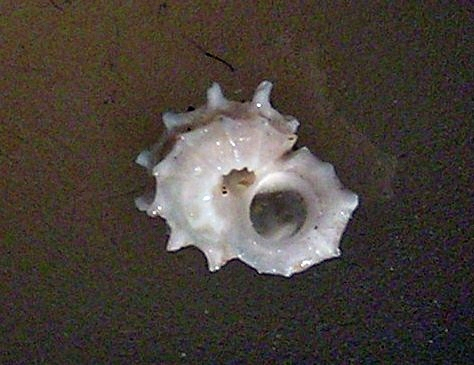
Apertural view
