= Tritonoharpa angasi =

Scientific classification
- Kingdom: Animalia
- Phylum: Mollusca
- Class: Gastropoda
- Subclass: Caenogastropoda
- Order: Neogastropoda
- Family: Cancellariidae
- Genus: Tritonoharpa
- Species: T. angasi

Binomial name
- Tritonoharpa angasi (Brazier, 1877)

Synonyms
- Tritonium angasi Brazier, 1877

Species of gastropod

Tritonoharpa angasi is a species of sea snail, a marine gastropod mollusk in the family Cancellariidae, the nutmeg snails.
