= Tritonoharpa leali =

Scientific classification
- Kingdom: Animalia
- Phylum: Mollusca
- Class: Gastropoda
- Subclass: Caenogastropoda
- Order: Neogastropoda
- Family: Cancellariidae
- Genus: Tritonoharpa
- Species: T. leali

Binomial name
- Tritonoharpa leali Harasewych, Petit & Verhecken, 1992

Species of gastropod

Tritonoharpa leali is a species of sea snail, a marine gastropod mollusk in the family Cancellariidae, the nutmeg snails.
