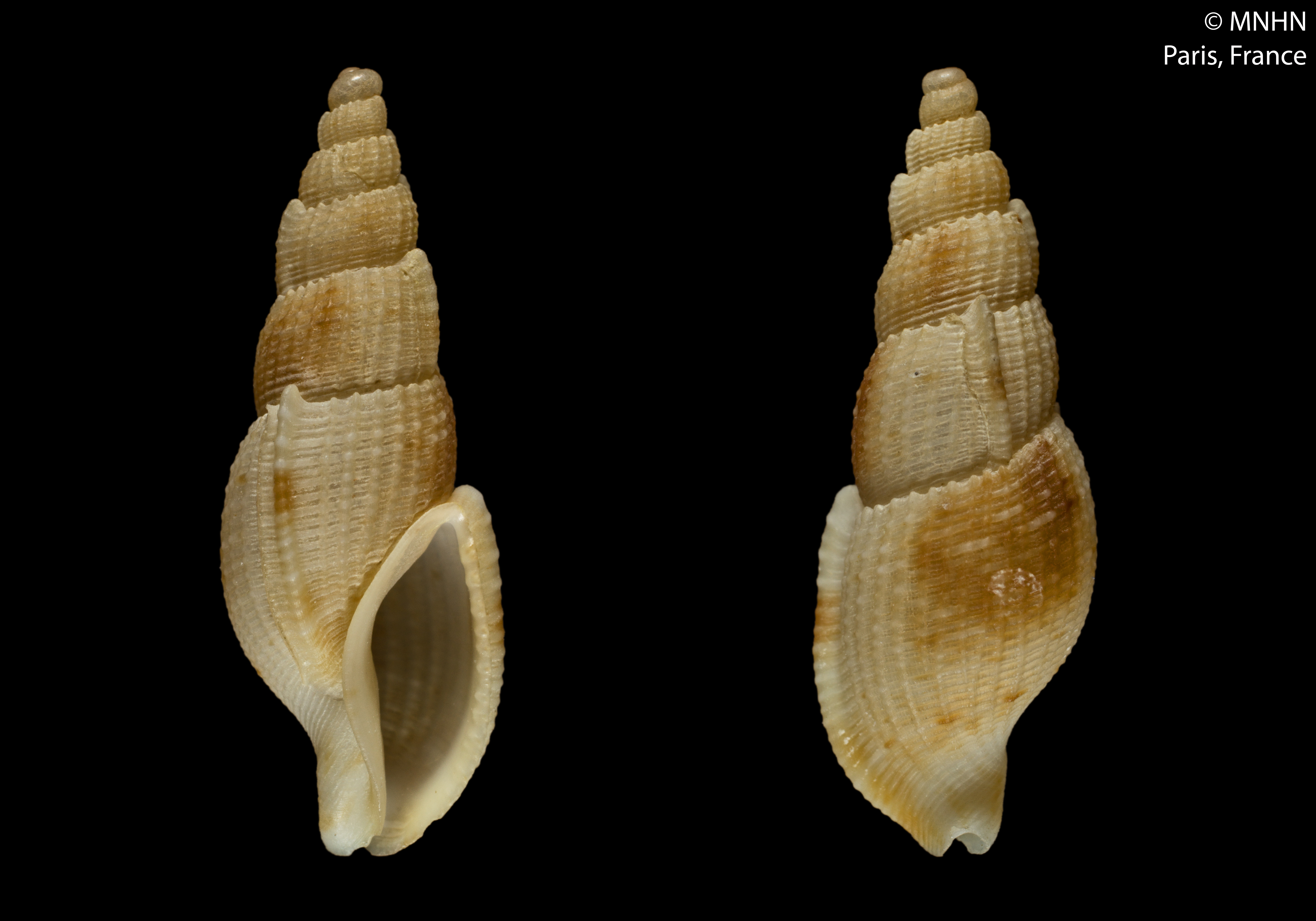
- Shell of Tritonoharpa beui (holotype at MNHN, Paris)

Scientific classification
- Kingdom: Animalia
- Phylum: Mollusca
- Class: Gastropoda
- Subclass: Caenogastropoda
- Order: Neogastropoda
- Family: Cancellariidae
- Subfamily: Plesiotritoninae
- Genus: Tritonoharpa
- Species: T. beui

Binomial name
- Tritonoharpa beui Verhecken, 1997

Synonyms
- Colubraria tchangsii X.-T. Ma & S.-P. Zhang, 2000

= Tritonoharpa beui =

Species of gastropod

Tritonoharpa beui is a species of sea snail, a marine gastropod mollusk in the family Cancellariidae, the nutmeg snails.
