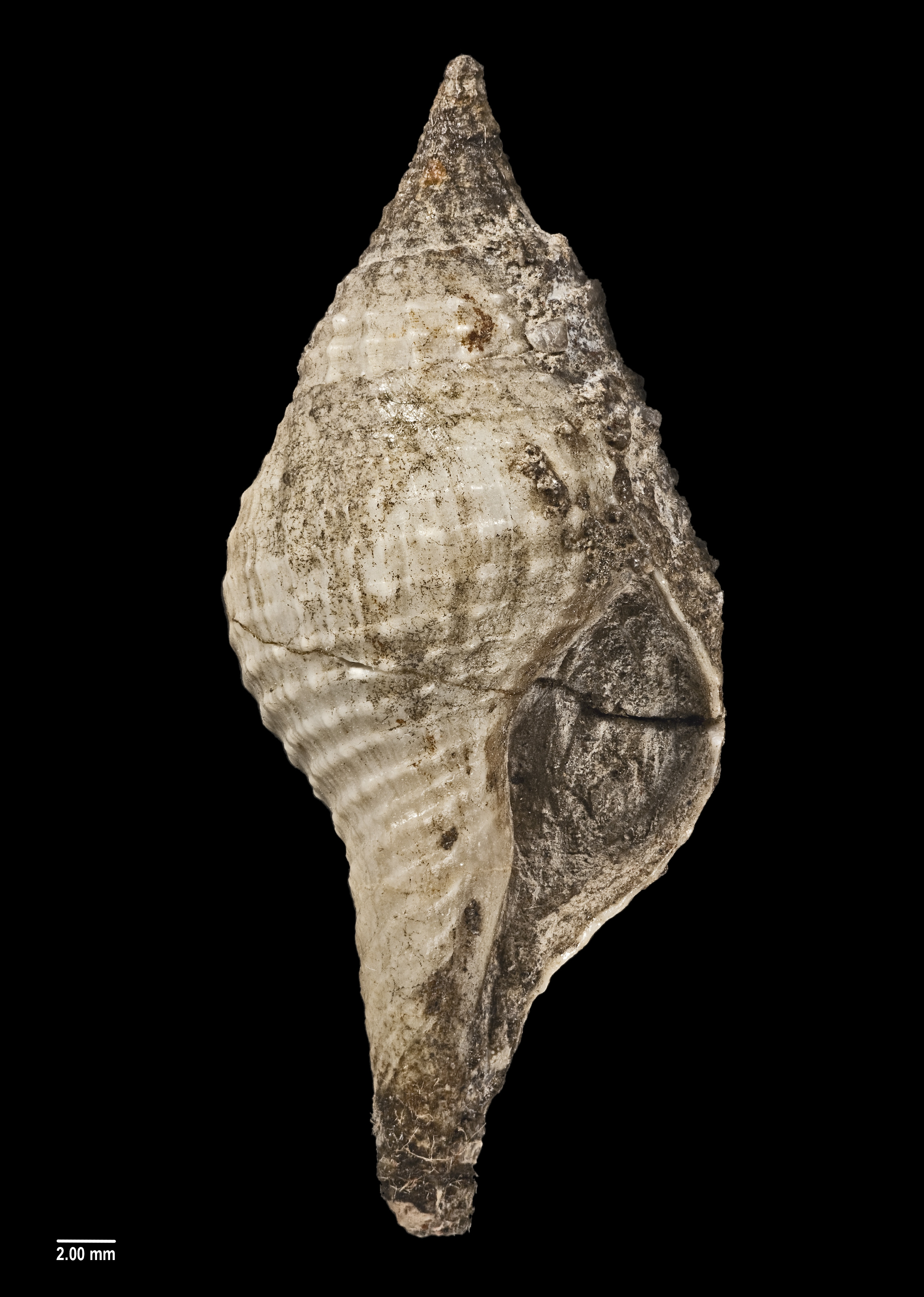
- Holotype from Auckland War Memorial Museum

Scientific classification
- Kingdom: Animalia
- Phylum: Mollusca
- Class: Gastropoda
- Subclass: Caenogastropoda
- Order: Neogastropoda
- Family: Fasciolariidae
- Genus: †Gemmocolus
- Species: †G. gemmata

Binomial name
- †Gemmocolus gemmata A. W. B. Powell, 1935

Synonyms
- Falsicolus (Gemmocolus) gemmatus (A. W. B. Powell, 1935); Falsicolus gemmatus A. W. B. Powell, 1935; Gemmocolus gemmatus (A. W. B. Powell, 1935)

= Gemmocolus gemmata =

Gemmocolus gemmata Temporal range: early Miocene

Extinct species of gastropod

Gemmocolus gemmata is an extinct species of sea snail, a marine gastropod mollusc, in the family Colloniidae. Fossils of the species date to early Miocene strata of the west coast of the Auckland Region.

== Description ==
In the original description, Powell described the species as follows:

Shell of moderate size, fusiform, massive. Spire elevated, conic, a little more than half the height of the aperture plus canal. Whorls about seven, apex small, unfortunately obscured by matrix in only complete specimen. Outline of whorls convex, almost fiat on spire, but with a very broad but extremely shallow subsutural depression. Canal rather short; pillar massive, straight, with a heavy oblique ridge at the base of the aperture. Outer lip not thickened. Sculpture of numerous rounded spiral cords and microscopic interstitial spiral threads, crossed by thin axials which render the cords slightly gemmate at the points of intersection. There are five spiral cords on the penultimate and about twenty-two on the body-whorl and canal-neck. The axials number nineteen on the penultimate, but on the body-whorl they become subobsolete and irregular, the gemmules being far more numerous and closely spaced. The axial sculpture does not extend over the spirals of the canal neck. Between each of the spiral cords on the spire whorls there are about six microscopic spiral threads, but these become obsolete below the periphery on the body-whorl. Aperture ovate, rather small.

The holotype of the species measures 42 mm (1.7 in) in length and has a diameter of 17 mm (0.67 in). The species can be differentiated from Risellopsis varia due to the presence of more strongly and evenly developed tricarinate keels, a more concave umbilical depression on the base sculpture, and a strong callus projection found on the outer reflexed edge of the inner-lip.

== Taxonomy ==
The species was first described by A. W. B. Powell in 1935, using the name Falsicolus gemmatus. In 1992, the species was recombined as Falsicolus (Gemmocolus) gemmatus, with Maxwell naming the species as the type species of the subgenus Gemmocolus. By 2009, Gemmocolus was raised to genus level, leading to the currently accepted name of the species. The holotype was collected at an unknown date prior to 1935 from southern Maukatia Bay near Muriwai, Auckland Region (then more commonly known as Motutara), and is held in the collections of Auckland War Memorial Museum.

== Distribution ==
This extinct marine species occurs in early Miocene strata of the Nihotupu Formation of New Zealand, on the west coast of the Waitākere Ranges of the Auckland Region, New Zealand.

== Gallery ==
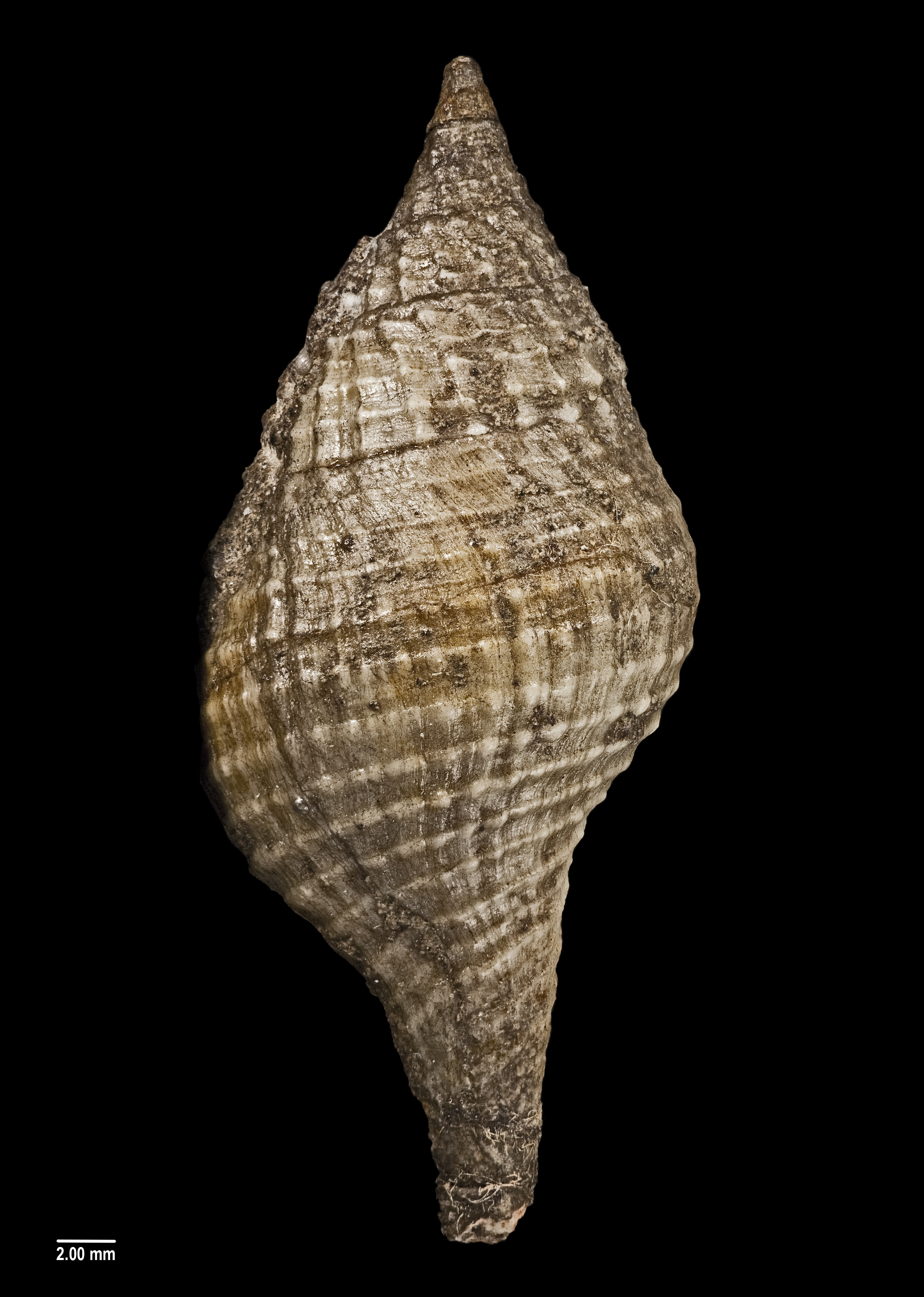
Reverse view of holotype

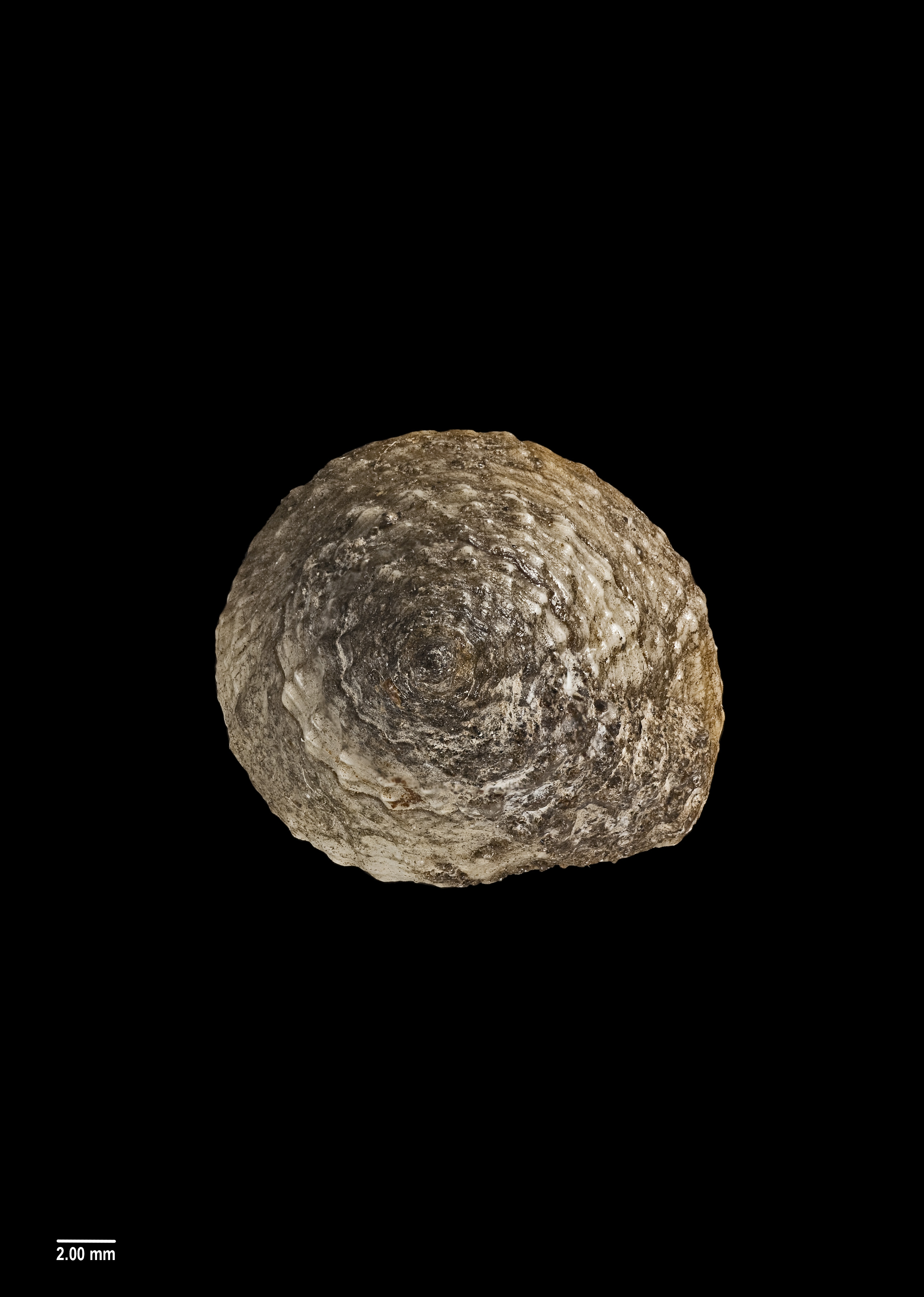
Top-down view of holotype
