= Liotina fijiensis =

Scientific classification
- Kingdom: Animalia
- Phylum: Mollusca
- Class: Gastropoda
- Subclass: Vetigastropoda
- Order: Trochida
- Superfamily: Trochoidea
- Family: Liotiidae
- Subfamily: Liotiinae
- Genus: Liotina
- Species: L. fijiensis

Binomial name
- Liotina fijiensis Pilsbry, 1934

Species of gastropod

Liotina fijiensis, common name the Pacific liotia, is a species of small sea snail, a marine gastropod mollusk, in the family Liotiidae.

== Description ==
Liotina fijiensis is a relatively large marine gastropod species characterized by its cream-white shell. The shell exhibits rounded axial ribs on the upper and peripheral regions, a strong spiral cord at the shoulder, and another prominent cord at the periphery. Between these primary sculptural elements, several smaller spiral cords are present, along with additional fine axial lineolation characteristic of the genus Liotia. Some specimens also exhibit fine pitting between the cords.

The base of the shell features multiple small spiral cords, followed by a larger cord, and a prominent smooth cord surrounding the umbilicus. This umbilical cord is bordered by a series of deep pits, with a sharply spiraling inner cord within the umbilicus. The aperture is slightly oblique, with a thick, crenulated peristome, accompanied by a double varix posteriorly.

== Distribution ==
This species occurs in the Pacific Ocean off Fiji.
