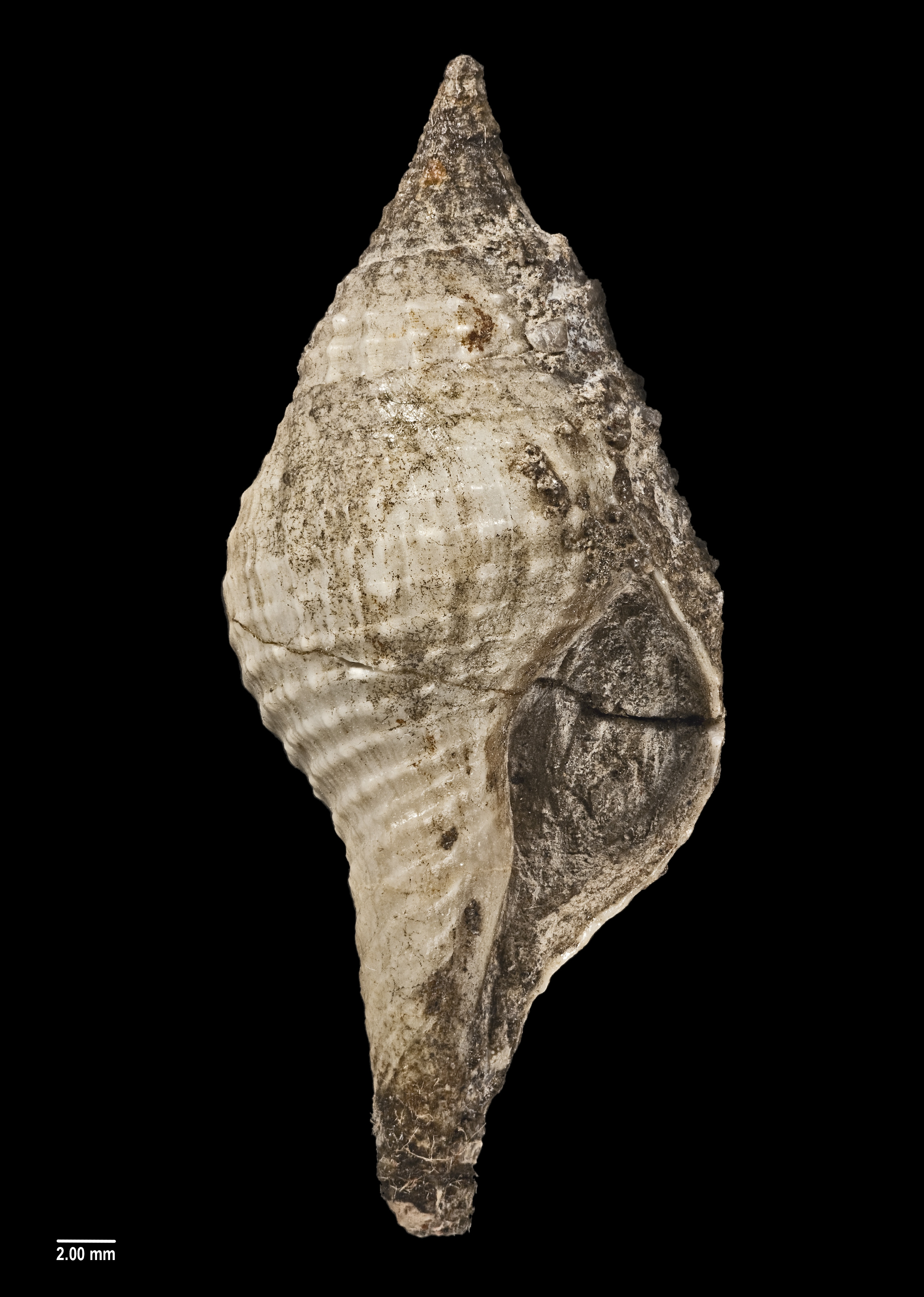
- Gemmocolus gemmata

Scientific classification
- Kingdom: Animalia
- Phylum: Mollusca
- Class: Gastropoda
- Subclass: Caenogastropoda
- Order: Neogastropoda
- Family: Fasciolariidae
- Subfamily: Fusininae
- Genus: †Gemmocolus; P. A. Maxwell, 1992

Type species
- † Falsicolus gemmatus A. W. B. Powell, 1935

Synonyms
- Falsicolus (Gemmocolus) P. A. Maxwell, 1992

= Gemmocolus =

Gemmocolus Temporal range: early Miocene–middle Miocene

Genus of gastropods

Gemmocolus is an extinct genus of sea snails, marine gastropod molluscs in the family Fasciolariidae. The genus includes two species, G. ectypa and G. gemmata, both known from the Miocene of New Zealand.

== Description ==
The genus has a differing gemmate sculpture compared to other closely related genera such as Falsicolus.

== Taxonomy ==
Gemmocolus was first described by Phillip A. Maxwell in 1992 as a subgenus of Falsicolus. By 2009, it was raised to genus level.

== Distribution ==
Fossils of the genus date to the early Miocene and middle Miocene of New Zealand. Fossils found in the Westland District may represent a third, undescribed species.

== Species ==
Species within the genus Gemmocolus include:

- † Gemmocolus ectypa (Marwick, 1931)
- † Gemmocolus gemmata (A. W. B. Powell, 1935)
