= Liotina gervilii =

Scientific classification
- Kingdom: Animalia
- Phylum: Mollusca
- Class: Gastropoda
- Subclass: Vetigastropoda
- Order: Trochida
- Superfamily: Trochoidea
- Family: Liotiidae
- Subfamily: Liotiinae
- Genus: Liotina
- Species: †L. gervilii

Binomial name
- †Liotina gervilii (Defrance, 1818)

Synonyms
- Delphinula gervilii Defrance, 1818; Liotina gervillei P. Fischer, 1885

Extinct species of gastropod

Liotina gervilii is an extinct species of sea snail, a marine gastropod mollusk, in the family Liotiidae.
