= Tritonoharpa siphonata =

Scientific classification
- Kingdom: Animalia
- Phylum: Mollusca
- Class: Gastropoda
- Subclass: Caenogastropoda
- Order: Neogastropoda
- Family: Cancellariidae
- Genus: Tritonoharpa
- Species: T. siphonata

Binomial name
- Tritonoharpa siphonata (Reeve, 1844)

Synonyms
- Triton siphonatus Reeve, 1844

Species of gastropod

Tritonoharpa siphonata is a species of sea snail, a marine gastropod mollusk in the family Cancellariidae, the nutmeg snails.
