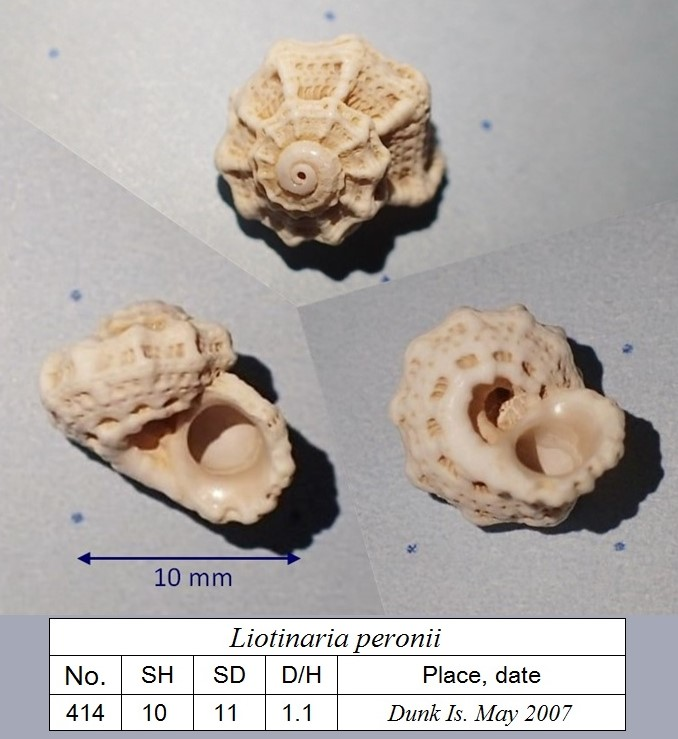

Scientific classification
- Kingdom: Animalia
- Phylum: Mollusca
- Class: Gastropoda
- Subclass: Vetigastropoda
- Order: Trochida
- Superfamily: Trochoidea
- Family: Liotiidae
- Genus: Liotinaria
- Species: L. peronii

Binomial name
- Liotinaria peronii (Kiener, 1838)

Synonyms
- Delphinula peronii Kiener, 1838; Liotina peronii (Kiener, 1838)

= Liotinaria peronii =

Species of gastropod

Liotinaria peronii is a species of sea snail, a marine gastropod mollusk, in the family Liotiidae.

== Description ==
The size of the shell varies between 4 mm and 20 mm. The shell is shouldered, radiately distinctly ribbed to the shoulder, below which they become obsolete, with a spiral rib forming the shoulder and another just below it. The tooth is somewhat tubercular, and there are numerous small elevated spiral lirae, becoming granular below. Between the lirae there are minute punctations, and a row of large, deep pits revolves around the base. The outer lip is strongly, crenulately varicose.
