= Tritonoharpa antiquata =

Scientific classification
- Kingdom: Animalia
- Phylum: Mollusca
- Class: Gastropoda
- Subclass: Caenogastropoda
- Order: Neogastropoda
- Family: Cancellariidae
- Genus: Tritonoharpa
- Species: T. antiquata

Binomial name
- Tritonoharpa antiquata (Hinds in Reeve, 1844)

Synonyms
- Colubraria antiquata; Epidromus antiquatus (Hinds in Reeve, 1844); Triton antiquatus Hinds in Reeve, 1844; Pisanella antiquata (Hinds, 1844)

Species of gastropod

Tritonoharpa antiquata is a species of sea snail, a marine gastropod mollusk in the family Cancellariidae, the nutmeg snails.
