= Liotinaria solidula =

Scientific classification
- Kingdom: Animalia
- Phylum: Mollusca
- Class: Gastropoda
- Subclass: Vetigastropoda
- Order: Trochida
- Superfamily: Trochoidea
- Family: Liotiidae
- Genus: Liotinaria
- Species: L. solidula

Binomial name
- Liotinaria solidula (Gould, 1859)

Synonyms
- Liotia solidula Gould, 1859; Liotina solidula (Gould, 1859)

Species of gastropod

Liotinaria solidula is a species of sea snail, a marine gastropod mollusk, in the family Liotiidae.
