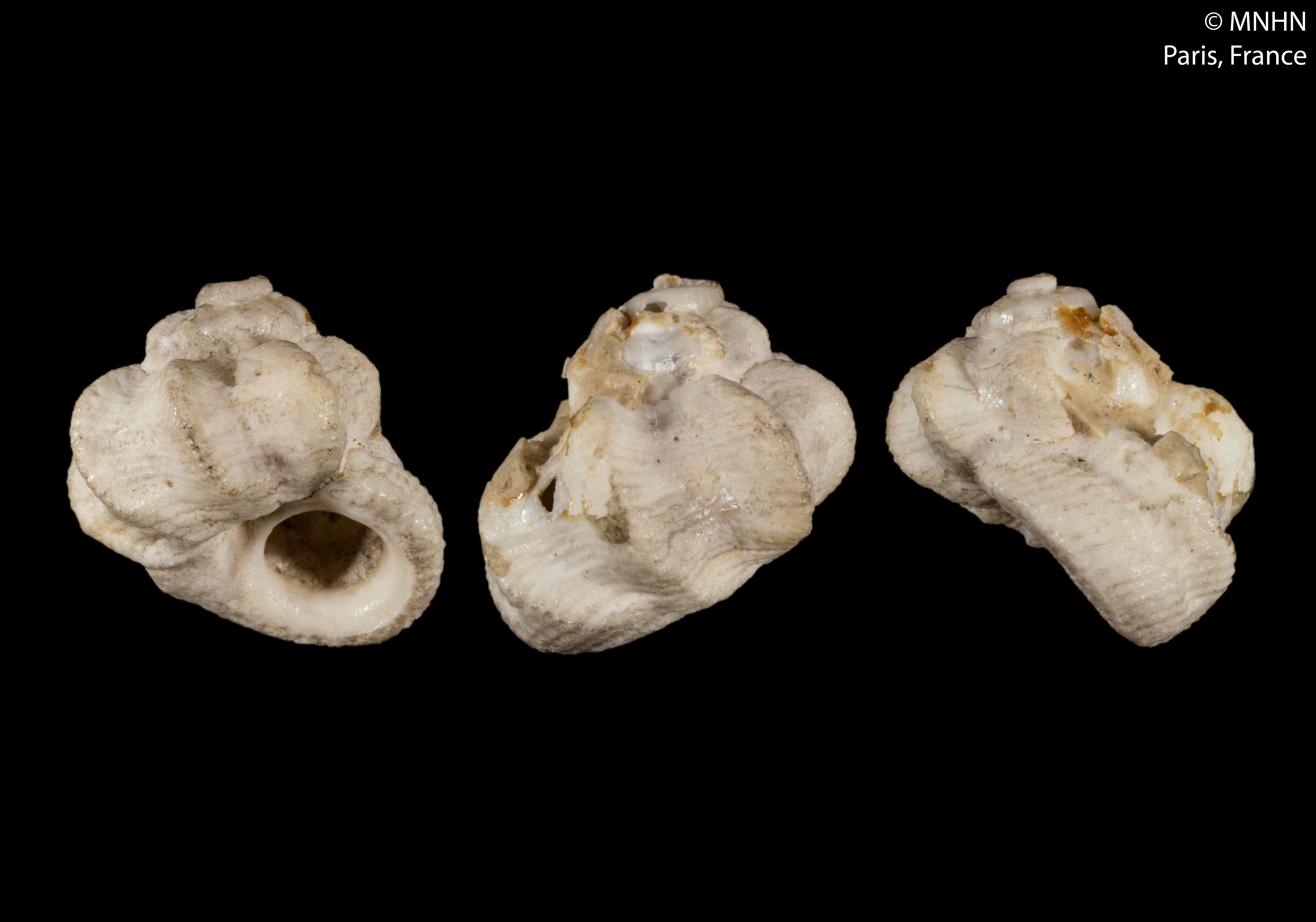
- Shells of Liotinaria scalarioides (syntype at MNHN, Paris)

Scientific classification
- Kingdom: Animalia
- Phylum: Mollusca
- Class: Gastropoda
- Subclass: Vetigastropoda
- Order: Trochida
- Superfamily: Trochoidea
- Family: Liotiidae
- Genus: Liotinaria
- Species: L. scalarioides

Binomial name
- Liotinaria scalarioides (Reeve, 1843)

Synonyms
- Delphinula scalarioides Reeve, 1843

= Liotinaria scalarioides =

Species of gastropod

Liotinaria scalarioides is a species of sea snail, a marine gastropod mollusk, in the family Liotiidae.

== Description ==
The length of the shell attains 15.4 mm.

== Distribution ==
This marine species occurs off the Philippines.
