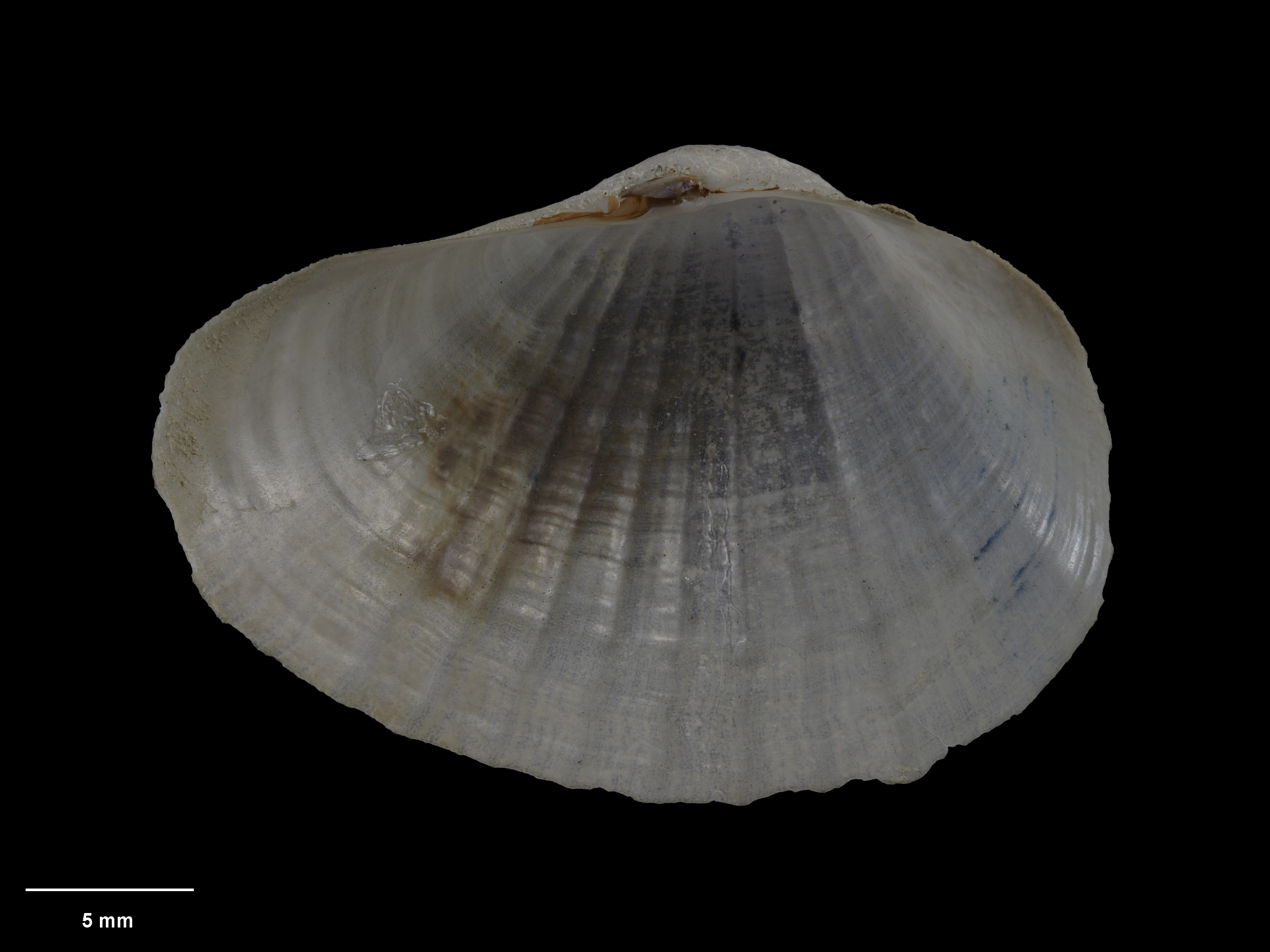
- Parilimya maoria

Scientific classification
- Kingdom: Animalia
- Phylum: Mollusca
- Class: Bivalvia
- Infraclass: Heteroconchia
- Subterclass: Heterodonta
- Superorder: Anomalodesmata
- Family: Parilimyidae; B. Morton, 1981

= Parilimyidae =

Family of bivalves

Parilimyidae is a family of bivalves belonging to the superorder Anomalodesmata.

Genera:

- Kanakimya Campbell & Grant-Mackie, 1995
- Panacca Dall, 1905
- Parilimya Melvill & Standen, 1899
- Procardia Meek, 1871
