= Phillip A. Maxwell =

New Zealand malacologist (1927–2014)

- Born: Phillip Alan Maxwell; 5 April 1940; Christchurch, New Zealand
- Died: 5 February 2007 (aged 66); Timaru, New Zealand
- Citizenship: New Zealand
- Education: University of Canterbury
- Scientific career
- Fields: Malacology
- Workplaces: GNS Science; Canterbury Museum
- Thesis: Studies on New Zealand cenozoic mollusca, including the eocene mollusca of McCullough's Bridge, Waihao River, South Canterbury (1975)

Phillip Alan Maxwell (5 April 1940 – 5 February 2007), was a New Zealand palaeontologist and malacologist, who became known as an expert on early to middle Cenozoic mollusca during the latter 20th century.

== Early life ==
Maxwell was born in Christchurch, attending Christ's College on a scholarship, later studying chemistry at Canterbury University. While completing his degree, Maxwell was inspired to study geology and paleontology after a field trip to Westland, winning the Sir Julius von Haast Prize for BSc (Hons) in Geology. For his Master of Science, Maxwell mapped the geology of the Kaiwara Valley of North Canterbury, and for his PhD focused on studying cenozoic mollusca, especially the Eocene molluscs found at the Waihao River in South Canterbury, which won Maxwell the McKay Hammer Award of the Geological Society of New Zealand.

== Career ==
After completing his master's degree, Maxwell began working for the New Zealand Geological Survey in Lower Hutt. Major publications of Maxwell's included his research into late Miocene mollusca of Stillwater Mudstone at Greymouth, and a major overview of New Zealand Cenozoic molluscan fauna in 1990, Cenozoic Mollusca of New Zealand, which won a DSIR Ministerial Award for Excellence in Scientific Research. A major work by Maxwell covering Eocene molluscs of the Waihaorunga Valley, covering more than 350 species, remains unpublished.

Maxwell moved to Waimate in 1990, and became a contract curator for Canterbury Museum. While Maxwell primarily focused on molluscs, his fieldwork led to discoveries outside of his field, including an archaeoceti skull Maxwell uncovered, and the holotype of Kaiika maxwelli, also known as Maxwell's penguin, which he discovered near the Waihao River in November 1998.

A significant amount of Maxwell's mollusc collection is held in the collections of Te Papa.

== Personal life ==
Maxwell had four children together with his wife Sue. Maxwell's hobbies included folk music, succulents, stamp collecting and construction using Meccano.

== Taxa identified by Maxwell ==
- Gemmocolus P. A. Maxwell, 1992
- Glyphea christeyi Feldmann & Maxwell, 1999
- Itiscala P. A. Maxwell, 1992
- Maoraxidae Bandel, Gründel & Maxwell, 2000
- Pileolidae Bandel, Gründel & Maxwell, 2000
- Sphaerocinidae Janssen & Maxwell, 1995
- Spinoseila P. A. Maxwell, 1992
- Tahuia P. A. Maxwell, 1992
- Zeatoma P. A. Maxwell, 1992

== Selected works ==
- Beu, A.G.; Maxwell, P.A. (1968). "Molluscan evidence for Tertiary sea temperatures in New Zealand: a reconsideration". Tuatara. 16: 69–74.
- Maxwell, P.A. "Middle Tertiary Mollusca from North Otago and South Canterbury, New Zealand, with a review of New Zealand species of Venericardia (Carditidae, Pelecypoda)". Transactions of the Royal Society of New Zealand Geology. 6: 155–185.
- Maxwell, Phillip A. (January 1978). "Taxonomic and nomenclatural notes on some New Zealand Cenozoic Mollusca, with descriptions of new taxa". New Zealand Journal of Zoology. 5 (1): 15–46. doi:10.1080/03014223.1978.10423743. ISSN 0301-4223. Wikidata Q99647734.
- Beu, A.G.; Maxwell, P.A. (1987). "A revision of the fossil and living gastropods related to Plesiotriton Fischer, 1884 (family Cancellariidae, subfamily Plesiotritoninae n. subfam.) with an appendix: Genera of Buccinidae Pisaniinae related to Colubraria Schumacher, 1817". New Zealand Geological Survey Paleontological Bulletin. 54: 1–140.
- Maxwell, Phillip A. (1988), Late Miocene deep-water mollusca from the stillwater mudstone at Greymouth, Westland, New Zealand: palaeoecology and systematics, Palaeontological Bulletin, LCCN 90118499, OCLC 21301858, Wikidata Q136815259
- Campbell, H. J.; Andrews, P. B.; Beu, A. G.; Edwards, A. W.; Hornibrook, NdeB; Laird, MG; Maxwell, P.A.; Mildenhall, D.C.; Watters, W.A. "Cretaceous–Cenozoic lithostratigraphy of the Chatham Islands, New Zealand". Journal of the Royal Society of New Zealand. 18: 285–308.
- Wood, RA; Andrews, P.B.; Herzer, R.H.; Cook, R.A.; Hornibrook, NdeB; Hoskins, R.H.; Beu, A. G.; Maxwell, P.A.; Keyes, I.W.; Raine, J.I.; Mildenhall, D.C.; Wilson, G.J.; Smale, D; Soong, R; Watters, WA (1989). "Cretaceous and Cenozoic geology of the Chatham Rise region, South Island, New Zealand". New Zealand Geological Survey Basin Studies. 3: 1–75.
- Beu, A.G.; Maxwell, P.A. (1990). "Cenozoic Mollusca of New Zealand". New Zealand Geological Survey Paleontological Bulletin. 58: 1–518.
- Feldmann, RM; Maxwell, PA (1990). "Late Eocene decapod Crustacea from North Westland, South Island, New Zealand". Journal of Paleontology. 64: 779–797.
- Maxwell, P.A. (1992). "Eocene Mollusca from the vicinity of McCulloch's Bridge, Waihao River, South Canterbury, New Zealand: paleoecology and systematics". New Zealand Geological Survey Paleontological Bulletin. 65: 1–280.
- Beu, A.G.; Griffin, M; Maxwell, P.A. (1997). "Opening of Drake Passage gateway and Late Miocene to Pleistocene cooling reflected in Southern Ocean molluscan dispersal: evidence from New Zealand and Argentina". Tectonophysics. 281: 83–97.
- Bandel, K.; Gründel, J.; Maxwell, P.A. (2000). "Gastropods from the upper Early Jurassic/early Middle Jurassic of Kaiwara Valley, North Canterbury, New Zealand". Paläontologie Stratigraphie Fazies 8; Freiberger Forschungshefte. C490: 67–132.
- Crampton, James S.; Beu, Alan G.; Cooper, Roger A.; Jones, Craig M.; Marshall, Bruce; Maxwell, Phillip A. (12 June 2003). "Estimating the rock volume bias in paleobiodiversity studies". Science. 301 (5631): 358–360. doi:10.1126/science.1085075. ISSN 0036-8075. PMID 12805555. Wikidata Q31146176.
- Cooper, Roger A.; Maxwell, Phillip A.; Crampton, James S.; Beu, Alan G.; Jones, Craig M.; Marshall, Bruce A. (2006). "Completeness of the fossil record: Estimating losses due to small body size". Geology. 34 (4): 241. Bibcode:2006Geo....34..241C. doi:10.1130/g22206.1. ISSN 0091-7613. Wikidata Q58457451.
- Maxwell, P.A. (2009). "Cenozoic Mollusca". In Gordon, D.P. (ed.). New Zealand Inventory of Biodiversity. Volume one. Kingdom Animalia: Radiata, Lophotrochozoa, Deuterostomia. Christchurch: Canterbury University Press. pp. 232–254. ISBN 978-1-877257-72-8.
