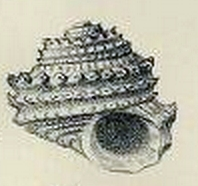
- Drawing with an apertural view of a shell of Liotia echinacantha

Scientific classification
- Kingdom: Animalia
- Phylum: Mollusca
- Class: Gastropoda
- Subclass: Vetigastropoda
- Order: Trochida
- Family: Liotiidae
- Subfamily: Liotiinae
- Genus: Liotia; Gray, 1842

Type species
- Delphinula cancellata Gray, 1828

= Liotia =

Genus of gastropods

Liotia is a genus of very small sea snails, marine gastropod mollusks in the family Liotiidae.

Liotia is the type genus of the family Liotiidae.

== Description ==
The species in this genus are small to minute. They have a depressed or turbinate shape. They are all umbilicated with a nacreous inner layer. The thickened outer lip, attached to the body whorl for a short length, is continuous. Where the operculum has been stated, it is horny and multispiral.

== Species ==
- Liotia admirabilis E. A. Smith, 1890
- Liotia affinis A. Adams, 1850
- Liotia arenula E. A. Smith, 1890
- Liotia atomus Issel, 1869
- Liotia cancellata (Gray, 1828)
- Liotia chilensis Osorio, 2012
- Liotia echinacantha Melvill & Standen, 1903
- Liotia fenestrata Carpenter, 1864
- Liotia microgrammata Dall, 1927
- Liotia romalea Melvill & Standen, 1903
- Liotia squamicostata E. A. Smith, 1903
- Liotia varicosa (Reeve, 1843)

Species brought into synonymy

- Liotia acrilla Dall, 1889: synonym of Cyclostrema cancellatum Marryat, 1818
- Liotia acryla Dall W.H., 1889: synonym of Cyclostrema cancellatum Marryat, 1818
- Liotia acuticostata Carpenter, 1864: synonym of Lirularia acuticostata (Carpenter, 1864)
- Liotia admirabilis auct. non E. A. Smith, 1890: synonym of Macrarene digitata McLean, Absalao & Santos Cruz, 1988
- Liotia amabilis Dall, 1889: synonym of Cyclostrema amabile (Dall, 1889)
- Liotia annulata Tenison-Woods, J.E. 1879: synonym of Liotella annulata (Tenison-Woods, J.E. 1879)
- Liotia aspina Dall, 1889: synonym of Arene briareus (Dall, 1881)
- Liotia asteriscus Gould, 1859: synonym of Pseudoliotia asteriscus (Gould, 1859)
- Liotia bairdii Dall, 1889: synonym of Arene bairdii (Dall, 1889)
- Liotia bellula H. Adams, 1873: synonym of Bothropoma bellulum (H. Adams, 1873)
- Liotia brasiliana Dall, 1927: synonym of Arene brasiliana (Dall, 1927)
- Liotia briareus Dall, 1881: synonym of Arene briareus (Dall, 1881)
- Liotia californica Dall, 1908: synonym of Arene californica (Dall, 1908)
- Liotia carinata Carpenter, 1857: synonym of Arene lurida (Dall, 1913)
- Liotia centrifuga Dall, 1896: synonym of Arene centrifuga (Dall, 1896)
- Liotia cookeana Dall, 1918: synonym of Liotia fenestrata Carpenter, 1864
- Liotia dautzenbergi Bavay, 1917: synonym of Astrosansonia dautzenbergi (Bavay, 1917)
- Liotia discoidea Reeve, 1843: synonym of Pseudoliotina discoidea (Reeve, 1843)
- Liotia disjuncta Hedley, C. 1903: synonym of Liocarinia disjuncta (Hedley, C. 1903)
- Liotia erici Strong & Hertlein, 1939: synonym of Haplocochlias erici (Strong & Hertlein, 1939)
- Liotia fulgens Gould, 1859: synonym of Turbo cidaris cidaris Gmelin, 1791
- Liotia gemma auct. non Tuomey & Holmes, 1856: synonym of Arene tricarinata (Stearns, 1872)
- Liotia hedleyi Prichard & Gatliff, 1899: synonym of Munditia hedleyi (Prichard & Gatliff, 1899)
- Liotia heimi Strong & Hertlein, 1939: synonym of Parviturbo stearnsii (Dall, 1918)
- Liotia huesonica Dall, 1927: synonym of Cyclostrema huesonicum (Dall, 1927)
- Liotia incerta Tenison-Woods, 1877: synonym of Munditia tasmanica (Tenison-Woods, 1875)
- Liotia krausii Gray J.E. in Gray M.E., 1850: synonym of Pseudotorinia kraussi J.E. Gray in M.E. Gray, 1850
- Liotia lamellosa Schepman, 1908: synonym of Bathyliotina lamellosa (Schepman, 1908)
- Liotia lucasensis Strong, 1934: synonym of Haplocochlias lucasensis (Strong, 1934)
- Liotia lurida Dall, 1913: synonym of Arene lurida (Dall, 1913)
- Liotia mayana Tate, R. 1899: synonym of Munditia mayana (Tate, 1899)
- Liotia microforis Dall, 1889: synonym of Arene microforis (Dall, 1889)
- Liotia minima Tenison-Woods, 1878: synonym of Lodderena minima (Tenison-Woods, 1878)
- Liotia miniata Dall, 1889: synonym of Arene miniata (Dall, 1889)
- Liotia nitida Verrill & Smith, 1885: synonym of Eccliseogyra nitida (Verrill & Smith, 1885)
- Liotia olivacea Dall, 1918: synonym of Arene olivacea (Dall, 1918)
- Liotia pacis Dall, 1908: synonym of Arene pacis (Dall, 1908)
- Liotia perforata Dall, 1889: synonym of Arene briareus (Dall, 1881)
- Liotia pergemma Gardner, 1948: synonym of Arene tricarinata (Stearns, 1872)
- Liotia planorbis Dall, 1927: synonym of Palazzia planorbis (Dall, 1927)
- Liotia polypleura Hedley, 1904: synonym of Liotella polypleura (Hedley, 1904)
- Liotia radiata Kiener, 1838: synonym of Arene cruentata (Mühlfeld, 1824)
- Liotia riisei Rehder, 1943: synonym of Arene riisei Rehder, 1943
- Liotia rostrata Hedley, 1900: synonym of Canimarina rostrata (Hedley, 1900)
- Liotia siderea Angas, 1865: synonym of Munditia tasmanica (Tenison-Woods, 1875)
- Liotia socorroensis Strong, 1934: synonym of Arene socorroensis (Strong, 1934)
- Liotia subquadrata Tenison-Woods, 1878: synonym of Munditia subquadrata (Tenison-Woods, 1878)
- Liotia tasmanica Tenison-Woods, 1875: synonym of Munditia tasmanica (Tenison-Woods, 1875)
- Liotia tortugana Dall, 1927: synonym of Cyclostrema tortuganum (Dall, 1927)
- Liotia tricarinata Stearns, 1872: synonym of Arene tricarinata (Stearns, 1872)
- Liotia trullata Dall, 1889: synonym of Arene bairdii (Dall, 1889)
- Liotia variabilis Dall, 1889: synonym of Arene variabilis (Dall, 1889)
- Liotia venusta Woodring, 1928: synonym of Arene venusta (Woodring, 1928) (primary homonym of Liotia venusta Hedley, 1901)
- Liotia venusta Hedley, 1901: synonym of Circulus venustus (Hedley, 1901)
