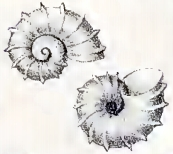
- Drawing with two views of a shell of Liotella annulata

Scientific classification
- Kingdom: Animalia
- Phylum: Mollusca
- Class: Gastropoda
- Subclass: Vetigastropoda
- Order: Trochida
- Superfamily: Trochoidea
- Family: Skeneidae
- Genus: Liotella; Iredale, 1915

Type species
- Liotia polypleura Hedley, 1904

= Liotella =

Genus of gastropods

Liotella is a genus of minute sea snails or micromolluscs, marine gastropod molluscs in the family Skeneidae.

== Description ==
The shells lack a thickened peristome. The shell is depressed. In some species the shell is coiled nearly into one plane, in others it is somewhat more elevated. The whorls are loosely coiled. The operculum is multispiral with a central nucleus. The sculpture shows strong transverse ribs. The spiral sculpture consists of fine lirae between the ribs or is sometimes almost or entirely obsolete.

== Species ==
Species within the genus Liotella include:

- Liotella annulata (Tenison Woods, 1874)
- Liotella anxia (Hedley, 1909)
- Liotella aupouria Powell, 1937
- Liotella cancellata (Krauss, 1848)
- Liotella capitata (Hedley, 1907)
- Liotella compacta (Petterd, 1884)
- Liotella corona (Hedley, 1902)
- Liotella crassicostata (Strebel, 1908)
- Liotella elegans Laseron, 1958
  - Liotella elegans darwinensis
- Liotella endeavourensis Dell, 1990
- Liotella indigens Finlay, 1927
- Liotella johnstoni (Beddome, 1883)
- Liotella kilcundae (Gatliff & Gabriel, 1914)
- Liotella mackenae Dell, 1956
- Liotella petalifera (Hedley & May, 1908)
- Liotella polypleura (Hedley, 1904)
- Liotella pulcherrima (Henn & Brazier, 1894)
- Liotella rotula (Suter, 1908)
- Liotella vercoi (Gatliff & Gabriel, 1914)

Species brought into synonymy

- Liotella coatsiana Melvill & Standen, 1912: synonym of Lodderia coatsiana (Melvill & Standen, 1912)
- Liotella gravicosta Laseron, 1954: synonym of Liotella petalifera (Hedley & May, 1908)
- Liotella kirai Habe, 1961: synonym of Munditiella kirai (Habe, 1961)
- Liotella littoralis Laseron, 1954: synonym of Liotella johnstoni (Beddome, 1883)
- Liotella parvirota Laseron, 1954: synonym of Liotella kilcundae (Gatliff & Gabriel, 1914)
- Liotella patonga Laseron, 1954: synonym of Liotella annulata (Tenison Woods, 1874)
- Liotella princeps Laseron, 1954: synonym of Liotella johnstoni (Beddome, 1883)
