= Lodderia waitemata =

Scientific classification
- Kingdom: Animalia
- Phylum: Mollusca
- Class: Gastropoda
- Subclass: Vetigastropoda
- Order: Trochida
- Superfamily: Trochoidea
- Family: Skeneidae
- Genus: Lodderia
- Species: L. waitemata

Binomial name
- Lodderia waitemata (Powell, 1940)

Species of gastropod

Lodderia waitemata is a minute sea snail or micromollusc, a marine gastropod mollusc in the family Skeneidae.

== Description ==
The height of the shell attains 0.5 mm, its diameter is 0.5 mm. Shell is closely related to the Lodderia iota but more strongly biangulate and with fewer axial threads. It has a notable characteristic of a smooth dome-shaped protoconch of one whorl. In spite of their minute size they seem to conform fairly well to the genus Lodderia.

== Distribution ==
This marine species is endemic to New Zealand and occurs off North Island.
