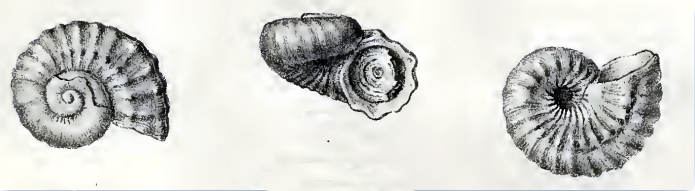
- Original drawing with three views of a shell of Munditia gaudens

Scientific classification
- Kingdom: Animalia
- Phylum: Mollusca
- Class: Gastropoda
- Subclass: Vetigastropoda
- Order: Trochida
- Family: Liotiidae
- Genus: Munditia
- Species: M. gaudens

Binomial name
- Munditia gaudens (Melvill & Standen, 1912)

Synonyms
- Cyclostrema gaudens Melvill & Standen, 1912

= Munditia gaudens =

Species of gastropod

Munditia gaudens is a species of sea snail, a marine gastropod mollusk in the family Liotiidae.

== Description ==
The height of the shell attains 1 mm. The small, white shell is deeply umbilicated. It has a depressed discoidal shape with a rather flat top. It contains 3½ whorls with a depressed apex. It is bluntly carinate at the periphery. The ribs are longitudinally closely lirate with about twenty two lirae. The region around the umbilicus is spirally carinate. The aperture is round. The peristome is thin. The operculum is multispiral with a central nucleus.

The species is lightly allied to Lodderia coatsiana (Melvill & Standen, 1912), but much differing in sculpture, especially in the suppression of the prominent peripheral keeling of the body whorl.

== Distribution ==
This species occurs in the South Atlantic Ocean, in the Magellanic Strait off Argentina at depths between 100 m and 570 m.
