= Liotella aupouria =

Scientific classification
- Kingdom: Animalia
- Phylum: Mollusca
- Class: Gastropoda
- Subclass: Vetigastropoda
- Order: Trochida
- Family: Skeneidae
- Genus: Liotella
- Species: L. aupouria

Binomial name
- Liotella aupouria Powell, 1937

Species of gastropod

Liotella aupouria is a species of small sea snail, a marine gastropod mollusc in the family Skeneidae.

== Description ==
The height of the shell attains 0.6 mm, its diameter 1.2 mm.

== Distribution ==
This marine species is endemic to New Zealand and occurs off Three Kings Islands at a depth of 260 m.
