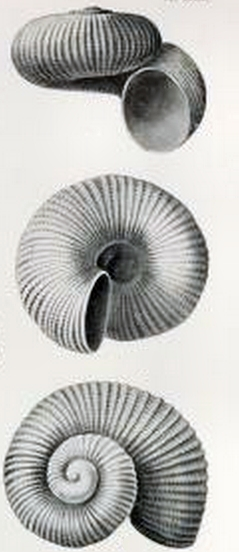
- Original drawing with three views of a shell of Liotella anxia

Scientific classification
- Kingdom: Animalia
- Phylum: Mollusca
- Class: Gastropoda
- Subclass: Vetigastropoda
- Order: Trochida
- Family: Skeneidae
- Genus: Liotella
- Species: L. anxia

Binomial name
- Liotella anxia (Hedley, 1909)

Synonyms
- Liotia anxia Hedley, 1909

= Liotella anxia =

Species of gastropod

Liotella anxia is a species of minute sea snail, a marine gastropod mollusc in the family Skeneidae.

== Description ==
(Original description by Ch. Hedley) The height of the shell attains 0.7 mm, its diameter 1.1 mm. The minute, depressed, pale buff shell has a turbinate shape and is widely umbilicate. The three whorls increase rapidly in size and are loosely coiled. The final half-whorl descends and departs from the remainder. The sculpture shows fine radial threads that traverse the whole shell. There are about sixty of these on the body whorl. Their interstices are closely latticed by rather finer spirals. The simple aperture is free and circular. The broad umbilicus is deep.

== Distribution ==
This marine species is endemic to Australia and occurs off Queensland.
