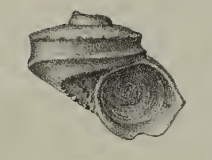
- Original drawing of a shell of Munditia meridionalis

Scientific classification
- Kingdom: Animalia
- Phylum: Mollusca
- Class: Gastropoda
- Subclass: Vetigastropoda
- Order: Trochida
- Superfamily: Trochoidea
- Family: Liotiidae
- Genus: Munditia
- Species: M. meridionalis

Binomial name
- Munditia meridionalis (Melvill & Standen, 1912)

Synonyms
- Brookula meridionale (Melvill & Standen, 1912); Cyclostrema meridionale Melvill & Standen, 1912

= Munditia meridionalis =

Species of gastropod

Munditia meridionalis is a species of small sea snail, a marine gastropod mollusk, in the family Liotiidae.

== Description ==
The height of this minute shell attains 0.75 mm and its diameter 0.50 mm. The delicate, white-gray shell has a depressed trochoidal shape and is deeply umbilicate. it contains 4 whorls. The nuclear whorls are slightly nepionic, and shapelessly turgid, but the penultimate and body whorl are very well sculptured and defined, being acutely spirally bicarinate. The aperture is round. The peristome is continuous. It is slightly thickened at the base around the umbilicus. Around the umbilicus, likewise, a third keel, crenulate, and not so acute, revolves. The dark red-brown operculum is multispiral with a not quite central nucleus. A pale straw-coloured epidermis covers the whole surface uniformly.

== Distribution ==
This species occurs in subantarctic waters off the South Orkney Islands and the South Shetland Islands at depths between 16 m and 18 m.
