= Lodderia eumorpha cookiana =

Scientific classification
- Kingdom: Animalia
- Phylum: Mollusca
- Class: Gastropoda
- Subclass: Vetigastropoda
- Order: Trochida
- Family: Skeneidae
- Genus: Lodderia
- Species: L. eumorpha
- Subspecies: L. e. cookiana

Trinomial name
- Lodderia eumorpha cookiana (Dell, 1952)

Synonyms
- Crosseola cookiana Dell, 1952

Subspecies of gastropod

Lodderia eumorpha cookiana is a subspecies of minute sea snail or micromollusc, a marine gastropod mollusc in the family Skeneidae.

== Description ==
The height of the shell attains 1.1 mm, its diameter is 1.2 mm.

== Distribution ==
This marine species is endemic to New Zealand and found off Chatham Rise.
