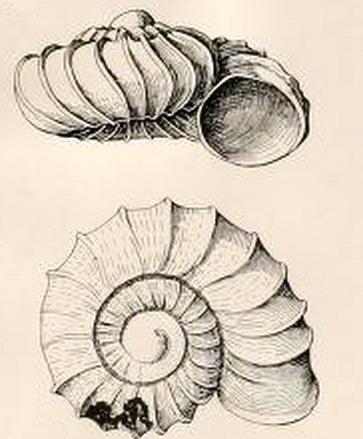
- Original drawing with two views of a shell of Liotella capitata

Scientific classification
- Kingdom: Animalia
- Phylum: Mollusca
- Class: Gastropoda
- Subclass: Vetigastropoda
- Order: Trochida
- Family: Skeneidae
- Genus: Liotella
- Species: L. capitata

Binomial name
- Liotella capitata (Hedley, 1907)

Synonyms
- Liotia capitata Hedley, 1907

= Liotella capitata =

Species of gastropod

Liotella capitata is a species of minute sea snail, a marine gastropod mollusk in the family Skeneidae.

== Description ==
(Original description by Ch. Hedley) The height of the shell attains 0.6 mm, its diameter 1.3 mm. The minute, cream-colored shell has a subdiscoidal shape. The spire is slightly elevated. The umbilicus is wide. The shell contains 3 whorls. The 1½ whorl of the protoconch is tilted and inflated. The body whorl comes scarcely in contact with the penultimate whorl, at last deeply descending. The sculpture of the shell shows sharp, projecting ring ribs, widely spaced on the last half whorl, but crowded on the penultimate. The interspaces and protoconch are smooth. The oblique aperture is oval and entire. It is downwardly directed and fortified by a prominent ring varix.

== Distribution ==
This marine species is endemic to Australia and occurs off New South Wales at a depth of 1460 m.
