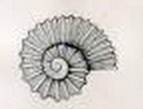
- Original drawing of a shell of Liotella rotula

Scientific classification
- Kingdom: Animalia
- Phylum: Mollusca
- Class: Gastropoda
- Subclass: Vetigastropoda
- Order: Trochida
- Family: Skeneidae
- Genus: Liotella
- Species: L. rotula

Binomial name
- Liotella rotula (Suter, 1908)

Synonyms
- Liotia rotula Suter, 1908; Cyclostremella neozelanica Suter, 1908; Liotella rotuloides Powell, 1937

= Liotella rotula =

Species of gastropod

Liotella rotula is a species of small sea snail, a marine gastropod mollusc in the family Skeneidae.

== Description ==
The height of the shell attains 1 mm, its diameter 1.7 mm. This thin, white, translucent shell has a discoidal shape and is widely umbilicate. The flat spire consists of 4 whorls, including the 2 narrow, smooth, convex whorls of the slightly raised protoconch. The shell is ornamented with many radial riblets and intercostal spiral striae. The rounded, elevated spiral riblets are prominent. These are much closer together on approaching the aperture. The Interstices are distantly microscopically spirally striate. The large, convex body whorl contains 17 radial riblets. It is rounded at the periphery, but convex at the base. The sutures are impressed. The aperture is rounded. The thin peristome is continuous, thickened by the last radiate rib. The columella is arcuate, not reflexed. The umbilicus is wide. Its perspective shows all the whorls.

== Distribution ==
This marine species is endemic to New Zealand.
