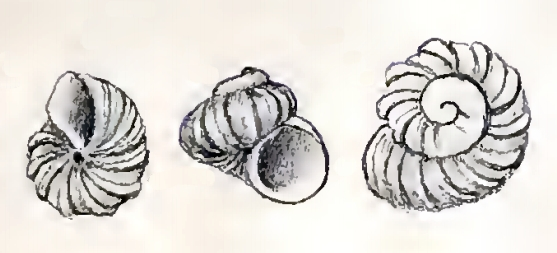
- Original drawing with three views of a shell of Liotella crassicostata

Scientific classification
- Kingdom: Animalia
- Phylum: Mollusca
- Class: Gastropoda
- Subclass: Vetigastropoda
- Order: Trochida
- Family: Skeneidae
- Genus: Liotella
- Species: L. crassicostata

Binomial name
- Liotella crassicostata (Strebel, 1908)

Synonyms
- Brookula crassicostata (Strebel, 1908); Cyclostrema crassicostatum Strebel, 1908 (original description)

= Liotella crassicostata =

Species of gastropod

Liotella crassicostata is a species of sea snail, a marine gastropod mollusk in the family Skeneidae,.

== Description ==
The height of the shell attains 0.8 mm, its diameter 0.8 mm. The yellowish white shell has a helicoidal shape. Its umbilicus is narrow. The shell contains 2½ whorls, slightly flattened at the periphery and then rounded. The sculpture consists, besides the lines of growth, of strong ribs (their number is shown about correctly in the image). The aperture is almost round. The columella is thickened.
