= Lodderia eumorpha =

Scientific classification
- Kingdom: Animalia
- Phylum: Mollusca
- Class: Gastropoda
- Subclass: Vetigastropoda
- Order: Trochida
- Superfamily: Trochoidea
- Family: Skeneidae
- Genus: Lodderia
- Species: L. eumorpha

Binomial name
- Lodderia eumorpha (Suter, 1908)

Synonyms
- Cyclostrema eumorpha Suter, 1908

Species of gastropod

Lodderia eumorpha is a species of small sea snail or micromollusc, a marine gastropod mollusc in the family Skeneidae.

== Description ==
The height of the shell attains 1.3 mm, its diameter 1.7 mm. The very small, umbilicate shell has a turbinate shape. It is white and translucent. It is distantly ribbed, and radiately striate. The sculpture consists of 5 prominent spiral riblets, the first just above the periphery. There is a low and indistinct spiral riblet on the body whorl outside the suture, and sometimes a fine riblet bordering the funnel-shaped umbilicus. The radiate sculpture is formed by distinct threads, which are equidistant and slightly directed backward, with their interstices wider than the threads. The spire is depressed conoidal. lower than the aperture. The minute protoconch is spherical and contains one whorl only. The three whorls of the teleoconch increase regularly. They are convex, the last flattened between the suture and the first spiral riblet. The periphery is rounded. The base of the shell is convex. The suture is impressed. The circular aperture is oblique. The peristome is continuous, smooth inside and ornamented outside by the spiral sculpture. The strong columella is arcuate and not reflexed. The deep umbilicus is rather narrow.

== Distribution ==
This marine species is endemic to New Zealand.

== Subspecies ==
- Lodderia eumorpha cookiana (Dell, 1952)
- Lodderia eumorpha eumorpha (Suter, 1908)
