= Munditia delicatula =

Conservation status
- Naturally Uncommon (NZ TCS)

Scientific classification
- Kingdom: Animalia
- Phylum: Mollusca
- Class: Gastropoda
- Subclass: Vetigastropoda
- Order: Trochida
- Family: Liotiidae
- Genus: Munditia
- Species: M. delicatula

Binomial name
- Munditia delicatula Powell, 1940

Species of gastropod

Munditia delicatula is a minute sea snail, a marine gastropod mollusc in the family Liotiidae, found only in New Zealand.

== Description ==
The height of the shell attains 0.5 mm, its diameter 1.5 mm.

== Distribution ==
This marine species is endemic to Three Kings Islands, New Zealand.
