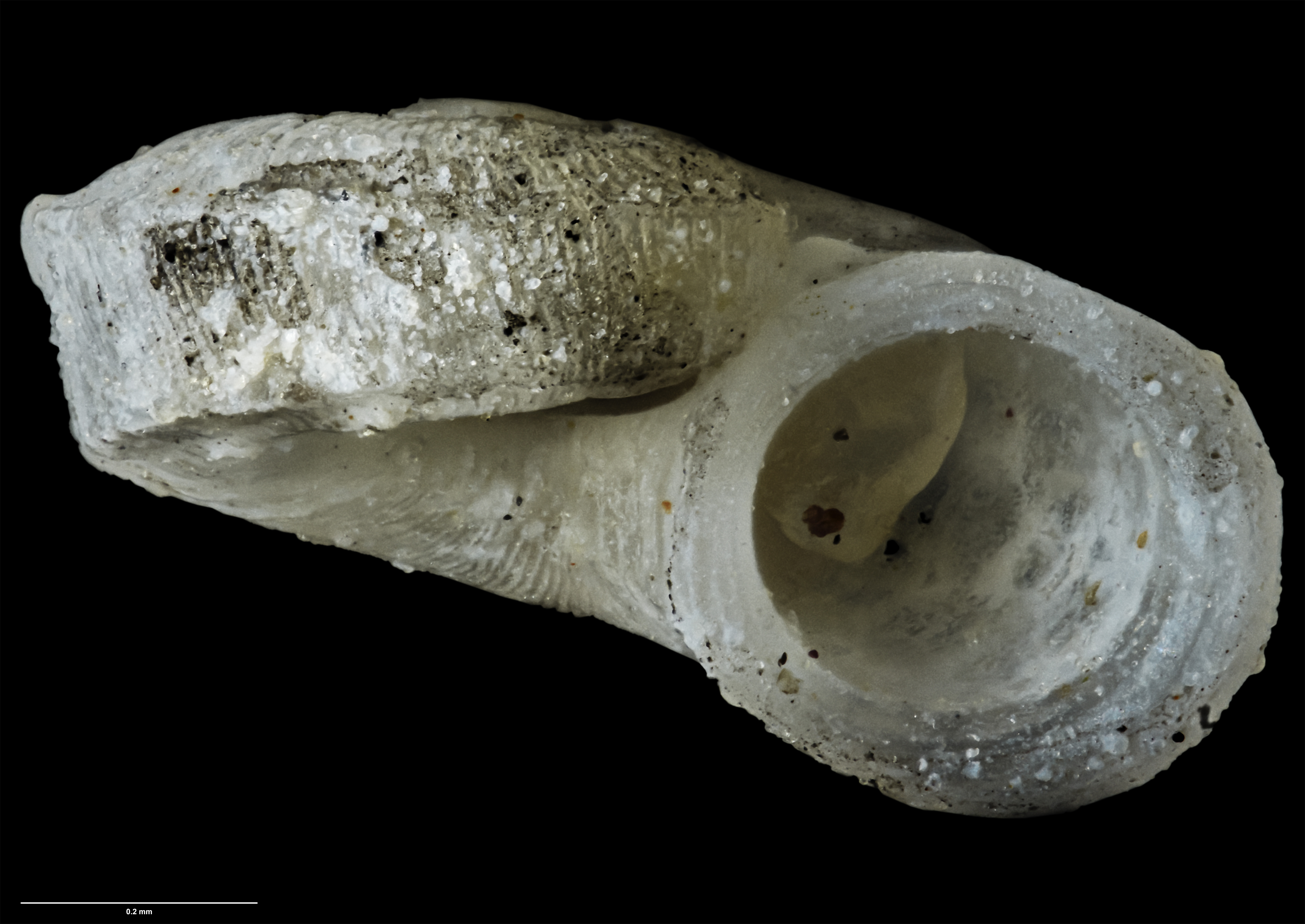

Conservation status
- Naturally Uncommon (NZ TCS)

Scientific classification
- Kingdom: Animalia
- Phylum: Mollusca
- Class: Gastropoda
- Subclass: Vetigastropoda
- Order: Trochida
- Family: Liotiidae
- Genus: Munditia
- Species: M. anomala

Binomial name
- Munditia anomala (Powell, 1940)

= Munditia anomala =

Species of gastropod

Munditia anomala is a minute sea snail, a marine gastropod mollusc in the family Liotiidae.

== Description ==
The shell of this species reaches a height of about 0.45 mm and a diameter of about 1 mm, making it one of the smaller marine gastropods. The shell exhibits a turbiniform or discoidal shape, characteristic of the Liotiidae family. The aperture is circular and feebly nacreous, with a thickened outer lip that is continuous and attached to the body whorl for a short length. The operculum is multispiral, horny, and hispid, with a soft, calcareous outer layer formed of pearly beads disposed spirally.

== Distribution ==
It occurs at Tom Bowling Bay, North Island, New Zealand.
