= Munditia aupouria =

Conservation status
- Naturally Uncommon (NZ TCS)

Scientific classification
- Kingdom: Animalia
- Phylum: Mollusca
- Class: Gastropoda
- Subclass: Vetigastropoda
- Order: Trochida
- Family: Liotiidae
- Genus: Munditia
- Species: M. aupouria

Binomial name
- Munditia aupouria Powell, 1937

Species of gastropod

Munditia aupouria is a minute sea snail, a marine gastropod mollusc in the family Liotiidae.

== Description ==
The height of the shell attains 1.7 mm, its diameter 3.5 mm.

== Distribution ==
It is an endemic marine species, known only from Three Kings Islands, New Zealand.
