= Munditia tryphenensis =

Scientific classification
- Kingdom: Animalia
- Phylum: Mollusca
- Class: Gastropoda
- Subclass: Vetigastropoda
- Order: Trochida
- Family: Liotiidae
- Genus: Munditia
- Species: M. tryphenensis

Binomial name
- Munditia tryphenensis (Powell, 1926)

Synonyms
- Liotina tryphenensis Powell, 1926

Species of gastropod

Munditia tryphenensis is a species of small sea snail, a marine gastropod mollusc in the family Liotiidae.

== Distribution ==
This endemic marine species occurs in New Zealand's North Island.
