= Munditia owengaensis =

Scientific classification
- Kingdom: Animalia
- Phylum: Mollusca
- Class: Gastropoda
- Subclass: Vetigastropoda
- Order: Trochida
- Family: Liotiidae
- Genus: Munditia
- Species: M. owengaensis

Binomial name
- Munditia owengaensis Powell, 1933

Species of gastropod

Munditia owengaensis is a minute sea snail, a marine gastropod mollusc in the family Liotiidae.

== Distribution ==
This marine species is endemic to New Zealand and occurs at the Chatham Islands, New Zealand.
