= Liotia fenestrata =

- Drawing with an apertural view of a shell of Liotia fenestrata

Scientific classification
- Kingdom: Animalia
- Phylum: Mollusca
- Class: Gastropoda
- Subclass: Vetigastropoda
- Order: Trochida
- Family: Liotiidae
- Subfamily: Liotiinae
- Genus: Liotia
- Species: L. fenestrata

Binomial name
- Liotia fenestrata Carpenter, 1864

Synonyms
- Liotia cookeana Dall, 1918

Species of gastropod

Liotia fenestrata is a species of sea snail, a marine gastropod mollusk in the family Liotiidae.

== Description ==
The small, brownish white shell is clathrate by equidistant spiral and radiating riblets, with deep interstices. Its shape is at first subdiscoidal, but later variable. The apex is depressed. The nuclear whorls are flat and smooth. The teleoconch contains 2½ convex whorls. It is clathrate by about 15 equidistant radiating and 7 spiral ribs, with deep pitted interspaces. The sculpture terminates with a spiral ridge surrounding the rather wide, deep umbilicus. The circular aperture is frequently slightly sloping and is slightly attached to the parietal wall. The inner lip is sinuated in the umbilical region.

== Distribution ==
This marine species occurs in the Pacific Ocean off California.
