= Liotella endeavourensis =

Scientific classification
- Kingdom: Animalia
- Phylum: Mollusca
- Class: Gastropoda
- Subclass: Vetigastropoda
- Order: Trochida
- Family: Skeneidae
- Genus: Liotella
- Species: L. endeavourensis

Binomial name
- Liotella endeavourensis Dell, 1990

Species of gastropod

Liotella endeavourensis is a species of sea snail, a marine gastropod mollusk in the family Skeneidae.

== Distribution ==
This species occurs in Antarctic Ocean.
