= Liotella compacta =

Scientific classification
- Kingdom: Animalia
- Phylum: Mollusca
- Class: Gastropoda
- Subclass: Vetigastropoda
- Order: Trochida
- Family: Skeneidae
- Genus: Liotella
- Species: L. compacta

Binomial name
- Liotella compacta (Petterd, 1884)

Synonyms
- Liotia compacta Petterd, 1884

Species of gastropod

Liotella compacta is a species of small sea snail, a marine gastropod mollusc in the family Skeneidae.

== Description ==
The diameter of the shell attains 1.3 mm.

== Distribution ==
This marine species is endemic to Australia and occurs off South Australia and Tasmania.
