= Liotia varicosa =

Scientific classification
- Kingdom: Animalia
- Phylum: Mollusca
- Class: Gastropoda
- Subclass: Vetigastropoda
- Order: Trochida
- Superfamily: Trochoidea
- Family: Liotiidae
- Subfamily: Liotiinae
- Genus: Liotia
- Species: L. varicosa

Binomial name
- Liotia varicosa (Reeve, 1843)

Synonyms
- Delphinula varicosa Reeve, 1843

Species of gastropod

Liotia varicosa is a species of sea snail, a marine gastropod mollusk, in the family Liotiidae.
