= Munditia manawatawhia =

Conservation status
- Naturally Uncommon (NZ TCS)

Scientific classification
- Kingdom: Animalia
- Phylum: Mollusca
- Class: Gastropoda
- Subclass: Vetigastropoda
- Order: Trochida
- Family: Liotiidae
- Genus: Munditia
- Species: M. manawatawhia

Binomial name
- Munditia manawatawhia Powell, 1937

Species of gastropod

Munditia manawatawhia is a minute sea snail, a marine gastropod mollusc in the family Liotiidae.

== Description ==
The height of the smooth shell attains 0.8 mm, its diameter 1.5 mm. This very small, white shell has a discoidal shape and wide umbilicus. It contains 2½ rapidly increasing whorls. The aperture is circular.

== Distribution ==
This marine species is endemic to New Zealand. It is known from the Three Kings Islands, New Zealand.
