= Liotia microgrammata =

Scientific classification
- Kingdom: Animalia
- Phylum: Mollusca
- Class: Gastropoda
- Subclass: Vetigastropoda
- Order: Trochida
- Family: Liotiidae
- Genus: Liotia
- Species: L. microgrammata

Binomial name
- Liotia microgrammata Dall, 1927

Species of gastropod

Liotia microgrammata is a species of sea snail, a marine gastropod mollusk in the family Liotiidae.

== Description ==
The shell grows to a length of 2 mm.

== Distribution ==
This species occurs in the Caribbean Sea off Cuba at a depth of about 350 m.
