= Liotia chilensis =

Scientific classification
- Kingdom: Animalia
- Phylum: Mollusca
- Class: Gastropoda
- Subclass: Vetigastropoda
- Order: Trochida
- Superfamily: Trochoidea
- Family: Liotiidae
- Subfamily: Liotiinae
- Genus: Liotia
- Species: L. chilensis

Binomial name
- Liotia chilensis Osorio, 2012

Species of gastropod

Liotia chilensis is a species of sea snail, a marine gastropod mollusk, in the family Liotiidae.
