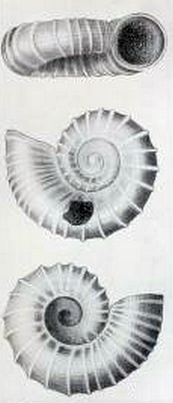
- Original drawing with three views of a shell of Liotella kilcundai

Scientific classification
- Kingdom: Animalia
- Phylum: Mollusca
- Class: Gastropoda
- Subclass: Vetigastropoda
- Order: Trochida
- Family: Skeneidae
- Genus: Liotella
- Species: L. kilcundae

Binomial name
- Liotella kilcundae (Gatliff & Gabriel, 1914)

Synonyms
- Chunula kilcundae (Gatliff & Gabriel, 1914); Cyclostrema kilcundae Gatliff & Gabriel, 1914 (original combination); Liotella parvirota Laseron, 1954

= Liotella kilcundae =

Species of gastropod

Liotella kilcundae is a species of minute sea snail, a marine gastropod mollusc in the family Skeneidae.

== Description ==
The height of the shell attains 0.25mm, its diameter 1.25 mm. The very minute, white, hyaline shell consists of four whorls, including the smooth, globular protoconch. It has a discoidal shape with a sunken spire and is widely umbilicated. It is ornamented with transverse riblets. On the body whorl they number about 27. They are irregularly spaced, becoming more crowded towards the aperture. The intervening spaces are traversed by very fine, encircling incised lines. The aperture is circular.

== Distribution ==
This marine species is endemic to Australia and occurs off New South Wales and Victoria.
