= Munditia suteri =

Scientific classification
- Kingdom: Animalia
- Phylum: Mollusca
- Class: Gastropoda
- Subclass: Vetigastropoda
- Order: Trochida
- Family: Liotiidae
- Genus: Munditia
- Species: M. suteri

Binomial name
- Munditia suteri (Mestayer, 1919)

Synonyms
- Liotia suteri Mestayer, 1919

Species of gastropod

Munditia suteri is a minute sea snail, a marine gastropod mollusc in the family Liotiidae.

== Description ==
The height of the shell attains 1.5 mm, its diameter 3 mm. This marine spêcies is endemic to the Bounty Islands, New Zealand.
