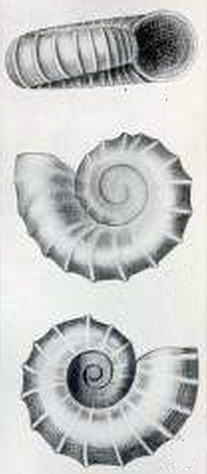
- Original drawing with three views of a shell of Liotella vercoi

Scientific classification
- Kingdom: Animalia
- Phylum: Mollusca
- Class: Gastropoda
- Subclass: Vetigastropoda
- Order: Trochida
- Family: Skeneidae
- Genus: Liotella
- Species: L. vercoi

Binomial name
- Liotella vercoi (Gatliff & Gabriel, 1914)

Synonyms
- Cyclostrema vercoi Gatliff & Gabriel, 1914 (original combination); Granigyra vercoi (Gatliff & Gabriel, 1914)

= Liotella vercoi =

Species of gastropod

Liotella vercoi is a species of minute sea snail, a marine gastropod mollusc in the family Skeneidae.

== Description ==
The height of this poorly known shell attains 0.27 mm, its diameter 0.75 mm. The very minute, white, opaque shell consists of four whorls, including the smooth, globular protoconch. It has a discoidal shape with a sunken spire and is widely umbilicated. It is ornamented with transverse riblets. On the body whorl they number about 17. The intervening spaces are smooth, with the exception of a median spiral thread on the base. The aperture is circular.

== Distribution ==
This marine species is endemic to Australia and was dredged at Wilson's Promontory off Victoria.
