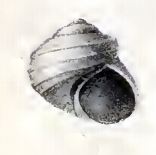
- Original drawing with an apertural view of a shell of Liotia arenula

Scientific classification
- Kingdom: Animalia
- Phylum: Mollusca
- Class: Gastropoda
- Subclass: Vetigastropoda
- Order: Trochida
- Family: Liotiidae
- Subfamily: Liotiinae
- Genus: Liotia
- Species: L. arenula

Binomial name
- Liotia arenula E. A. Smith, 1890

= Liotia arenula =

Species of gastropod

Liotia arenula is a species of sea snail, a marine gastropod mollusk in the family Liotiidae.

== Description ==
The shell grows to a length of 0.5 mm and a diameter of 1.1 mm. The umbilicate, white shell has a depressed globose shape. The shell contains 3-3½ whorls. The upper whorl is almost plane, the middle one is round and angulated and contains spiral, microscopic striae. The cancellation of the body whorl is strongly developed, so that the pittings between the cross-ridges are deep and striking. The suture is deep and channelled. The uppermost of the six revolving lirae borders the channelled suture, and the umbilicus is encompassed by a swollen ridge, which is in addition to the six lines referred to. The microscopic striae are seen upon the lirae.

== Distribution ==
This species occurs in the Atlantic Ocean off St Helena
