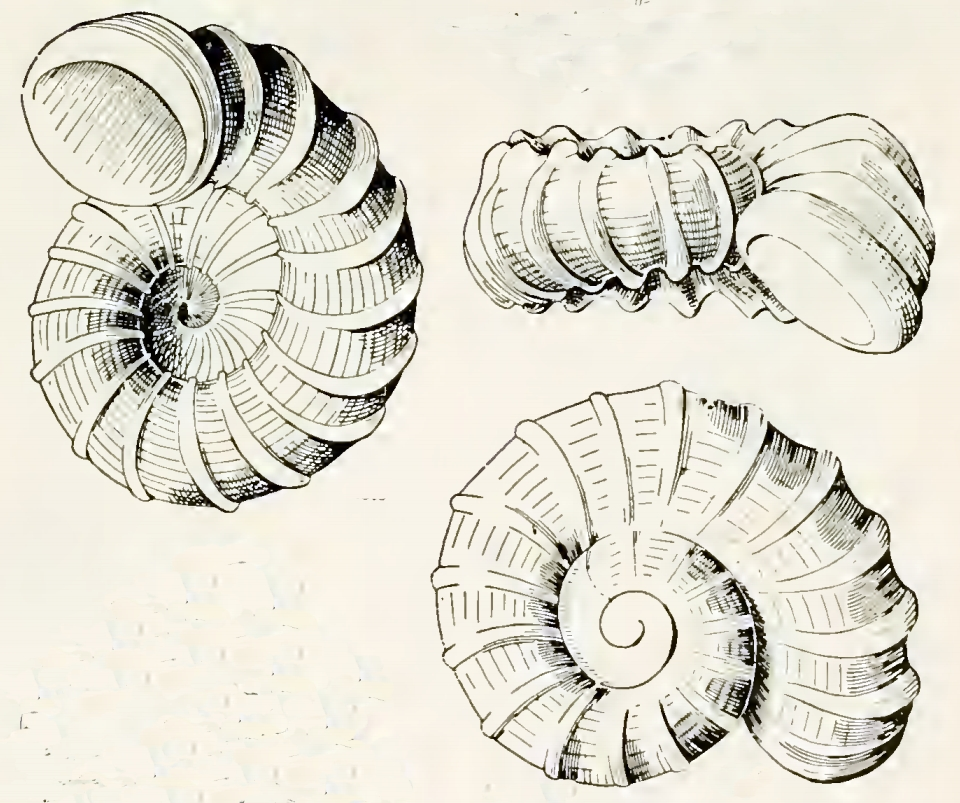
- Original drawing with three views of a shell of Liotella corona

Scientific classification
- Kingdom: Animalia
- Phylum: Mollusca
- Class: Gastropoda
- Subclass: Vetigastropoda
- Order: Trochida
- Family: Skeneidae
- Genus: Liotella
- Species: L. corona

Binomial name
- Liotella corona (Hedley, 1902)

Synonyms
- Liotia corona Hedley, 1902

= Liotella corona =

Species of gastropod

Liotella corona is a species of small sea snail, a marine gastropod mollusc in the family Skeneidae.

== Description ==
The height of the white shell attains 0.28 mm, its diameter 0.82 mm. The minute shell has a discoid shape. It is not nacreous. The spire is sunken. The umbilicus is wide and shallow. The shell consists of three whorls. The last half-whorl comes scarcely in contact with the others, and is suddenly and deeply deflected.

Sculpture: The body whorl is ringed by 16 thick, projecting, distant ribs which fade above and below at the sutures. These ribs continue on the suture for about half a whorl. The interstices of the ribs are faintly spirally scratched. The very oblique aperture is circular and fortified by a varix.

== Distribution ==
This marine species is endemic to Australia.
