= Munditia proavita =

Scientific classification
- Kingdom: Animalia
- Phylum: Mollusca
- Class: Gastropoda
- Subclass: Vetigastropoda
- Order: Trochida
- Superfamily: Trochoidea
- Family: Liotiidae
- Genus: Munditia
- Species: †M. proavita

Binomial name
- †Munditia proavita Laws, 1936

Extinct species of gastropod

Munditia proavita is an extinct species of sea snail, a marine gastropod mollusk, in the family Liotiidae.

== Distribution ==
This species occurs in New Zealand.
