= Munditia echinata =

Conservation status
- Naturally Uncommon (NZ TCS)

Scientific classification
- Kingdom: Animalia
- Phylum: Mollusca
- Class: Gastropoda
- Subclass: Vetigastropoda
- Order: Trochida
- Family: Liotiidae
- Genus: Munditia
- Species: M. echinata

Binomial name
- Munditia echinata Powell, 1937

Species of gastropod

Munditia echinata is a minute sea snail, a marine gastropod mollusc in the family Liotiidae.

== Distribution ==
This marine species is endemic to the Three Kings Islands, New Zealand.

The species is found at depths of about 475 m (1,558 ft).

== Description ==
Its shell is very small, solid, boldly sculptured with three spiral rows of long spines, otherwise the surface is smooth. It is white in colour and up to 0.6 mm high and 1.4 mm wide.
