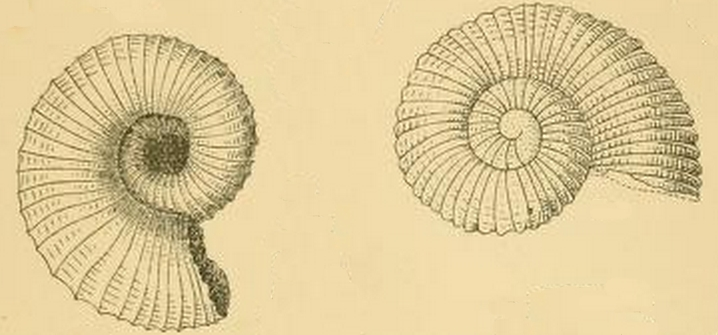
- Original drawing with two views of a shell of Liotella pulcherrima

Scientific classification
- Kingdom: Animalia
- Phylum: Mollusca
- Class: Gastropoda
- Subclass: Vetigastropoda
- Order: Trochida
- Family: Skeneidae
- Genus: Liotella
- Species: L. pulcherrima

Binomial name
- Liotella pulcherrima (Henn & Brazier, 1894)

Synonyms
- Homalogyra pulcherrima Henn & Brazier, 1894

= Liotella pulcherrima =

Species of gastropod

Liotella pulcherrima is a species of small sea snail, a marine gastropod mollusc in the family Skeneidae.

== Description ==
The diameter of the shell attains 1.4 mm. The thin, colorless and transparent shell is flat-coiled. It consists of three whorls, the body whorl rounded and rapidly descending. The suture is moderately deep. The whole surface is distinctly cancellated. The spiral striae are very minute and close together, with 30–50 on the body whorl. The longitudinals are much thicker and wider apart. The umbilicus is wide and deep. The aperture is round, with an entire margin that is not thickened. The thin peristome is continuous.

== Distribution ==
This marine species is endemic to Australia and occurs off New South Wales and Victoria.
