= Liotia affinis =

Scientific classification
- Kingdom: Animalia
- Phylum: Mollusca
- Class: Gastropoda
- Subclass: Vetigastropoda
- Order: Trochida
- Superfamily: Trochoidea
- Family: Liotiidae
- Subfamily: Liotiinae
- Genus: Liotia
- Species: L. affinis

Binomial name
- Liotia affinis A. Adams, 1850

Species of gastropod

Liotia affinis is a species of sea snail, a marine gastropod mollusk, in the family Liotiidae.
