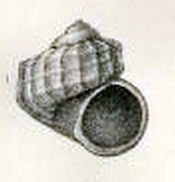
- Original drawing with an apertural view of a shell of Liotia admirabilis

Scientific classification
- Kingdom: Animalia
- Phylum: Mollusca
- Class: Gastropoda
- Subclass: Vetigastropoda
- Order: Trochida
- Family: Liotiidae
- Subfamily: Liotiinae
- Genus: Liotia
- Species: L. admirabilis

Binomial name
- Liotia admirabilis E. A. Smith, 1890

= Liotia admirabilis =

Species of gastropod

Liotia admirabilis is a species of sea snail, a marine gastropod mollusk in the family Liotiidae.

== Description ==
The shell grows to a length of 1 mm and a diameter of 1.3 mm. The shell has a depressed globose shape. It is strongly sculptured and profoundly umbilicated. The shell contains 3½ whorls. The uppermost of the keels on the body whorl revolves up to the spire and forms the angle on the upper volutions. The lowermost carina borders the umbilicus and the next one occupies the middle of the under surface. The longitudinal lamellae are continuous on and between the keels. The aperture is round.

== Distribution ==
This species occurs in the Atlantic Ocean off St Helena
