= Liotia cancellata =

- Drawing of a shell of Liotia cancellata

Scientific classification
- Kingdom: Animalia
- Phylum: Mollusca
- Class: Gastropoda
- Subclass: Vetigastropoda
- Order: Trochida
- Superfamily: Trochoidea
- Family: Liotiidae
- Subfamily: Liotiinae
- Genus: Liotia
- Species: L. cancellata

Binomial name
- Liotia cancellata (Gray J.E., 1828)

Synonyms
- Delphinula cancellata Gray, 1828; Delphinula cobijensis Reeve, 1843

Species of gastropod

Liotia cancellata is a species of small sea snail, a marine gastropod mollusk in the family Liotiidae.

== Description ==
The shell size ranges from 2.5 mm to 4 mm. It is thick, solid and turbinate in shape, with a relatively elevated spire . The convex whorls are regularly latticed with equidistant spiral and longitudinal ribs. The moderately sizedumbilicus is defined by a spiral rib. The outer lip is simple.

== Distribution ==
This species is seen in the Pacific Ocean off Northern Chile and Peru.
