= Liotella indigens =

Scientific classification
- Kingdom: Animalia
- Phylum: Mollusca
- Class: Gastropoda
- Subclass: Vetigastropoda
- Order: Trochida
- Family: Skeneidae
- Genus: Liotella
- Species: L. indigens

Binomial name
- Liotella indigens Finlay, 1927

Species of gastropod

Liotella indigens is a species of minute sea snail, a marine gastropod mollusc in the family Skeneidae.

== Description ==
The height of the shell attains 0.55 mm, its diameter is 0.95 mm.

== Distribution ==
This marine species is endemic to New Zealand and occurs off Three Kings Islands.
