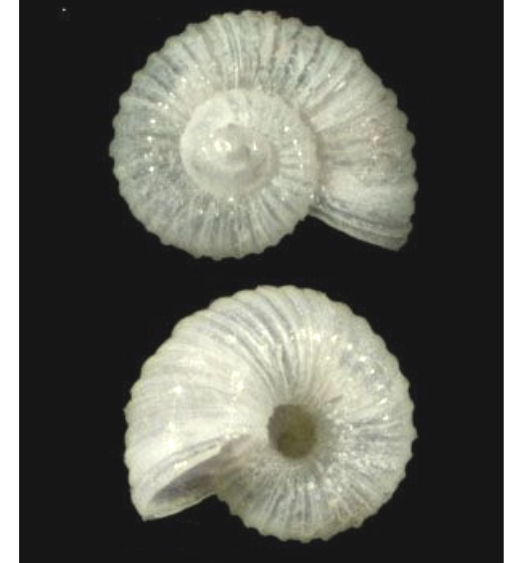
- Shell of Liotella johnstoni (specimen at the Natural History Museum, Rotterdam)

Scientific classification
- Kingdom: Animalia
- Phylum: Mollusca
- Class: Gastropoda
- Subclass: Vetigastropoda
- Order: Trochida
- Family: Skeneidae
- Genus: Liotella
- Species: L. johnstoni

Binomial name
- Liotella johnstoni (Beddome, 1883)

Synonyms
- Chunula johnstoni (Beddome, 1883); Cyclostrema johnstoni Beddome, 1883 (original description); Liotella littoralis Laseron, 1954; Liotella princeps Laseron, 1954

= Liotella johnstoni =

Species of gastropod

Liotella johnstoni is a species of small sea snail, a marine gastropod mollusc in the family Skeneidae.

== Description ==
The diameter of the shell attains 1.3 mm. The height to width ratio is 0.54 - 0.68. Protoconch is smooth and elevated. Teleoconch up to 2¼ rounded whorls with suture deep. The axial sculpture has low, moderately thick ribs, extending from suture into umbilicus, 20-30 on last whorl. Umbilicus is open and wide. Aperture is circular. Shell is colourless and transparent when fresh, becoming opaque over time with age.

== Distribution ==
This marine species is endemic to Australia and occurs off New South Wales, Victoria, South Australia and Tasmania at depths of 137 metres.
