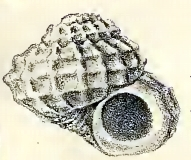
- Original drawing with an apertural view of a shell of Liotia romalea

Scientific classification
- Kingdom: Animalia
- Phylum: Mollusca
- Class: Gastropoda
- Subclass: Vetigastropoda
- Order: Trochida
- Family: Liotiidae
- Subfamily: Liotiinae
- Genus: Liotia
- Species: L. romalea

Binomial name
- Liotia romalea Melvill & Standen, 1903

= Liotia romalea =

Species of gastropod

Liotia romalea is a species of sea snail, a marine gastropod mollusk in the family Liotiidae.

== Description ==
The height of the shell reaches 5 mm and its diameter 5 mm. The small, solid shell has an ovate-round shape with 5 whorls. It is narrowly umbilicate. The two apical whorls are smooth, the antepenultimate has one keel, the penultimate two and the body whorl three keels. The shell contains longitudinally close, thick ribs. The interstices show longitudinal striae. The aperture is circular and white on the inside. The conspicuously thickened peristome is five-angled.

== Distribution ==
This species occurs in the Gulf of Oman and the Persian Gulf.
