= Liotia squamicostata =

Scientific classification
- Kingdom: Animalia
- Phylum: Mollusca
- Class: Gastropoda
- Subclass: Vetigastropoda
- Order: Trochida
- Superfamily: Trochoidea
- Family: Liotiidae
- Subfamily: Liotiinae
- Genus: Liotia
- Species: L. squamicostata

Binomial name
- Liotia squamicostata E. A. Smith, 1903

Species of gastropod

Liotia squamicostata is a species of small sea snail, a marine gastropod mollusk, in the family Liotiidae.

== Distribution ==
This species occurs in the Indian Ocean off the Maldives.
