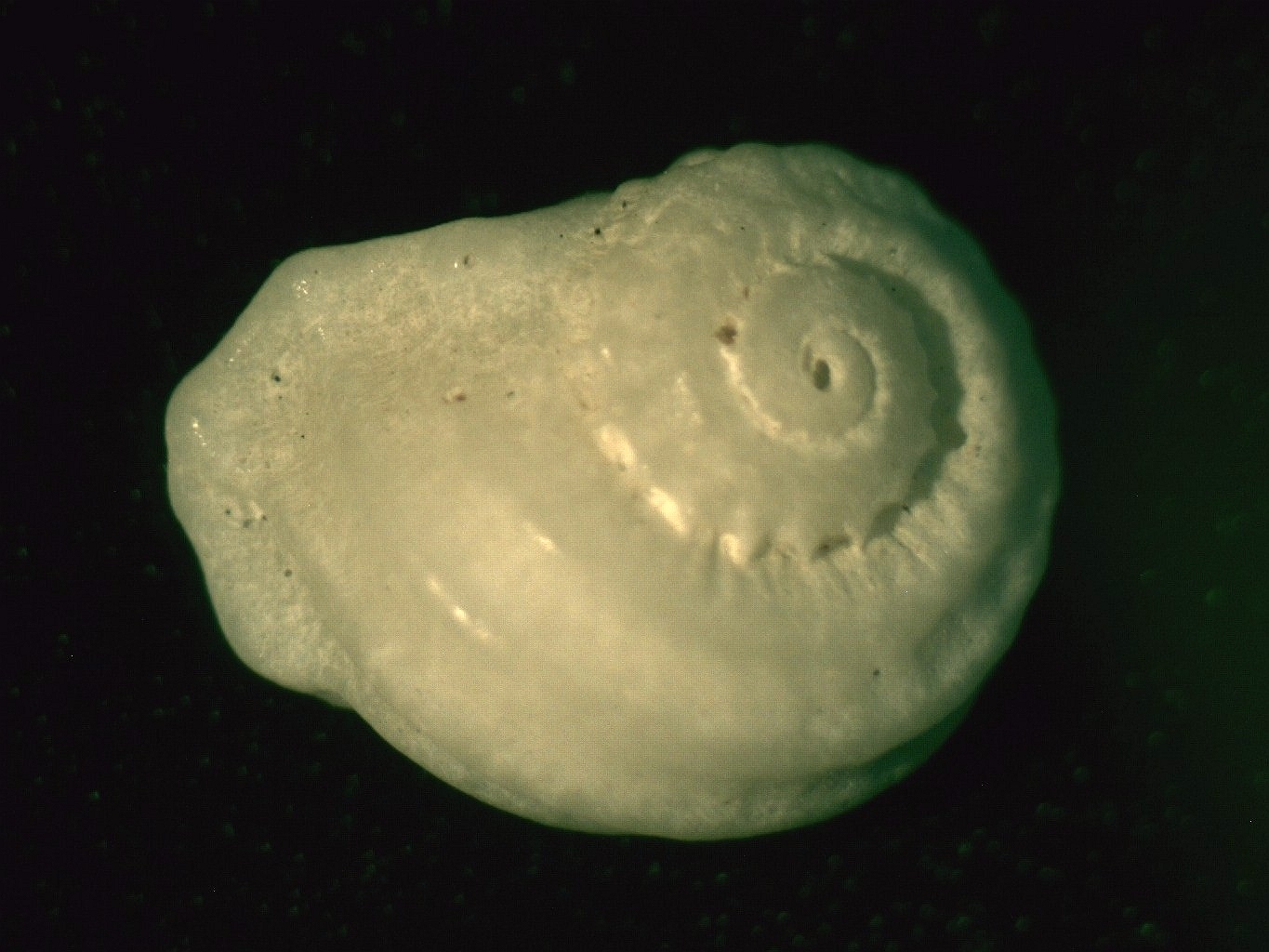
- Munditia subquadrata

Scientific classification
- Kingdom: Animalia
- Phylum: Mollusca
- Class: Gastropoda
- Subclass: Vetigastropoda
- Order: Trochida
- Family: Liotiidae
- Genus: Munditia; Finlay, 1926

Type species
- Liotina tryphenensis Powell, A.W.B., 1926

= Munditia (gastropod) =

Genus of gastropods

Munditia is a genus of sea snails, marine gastropod molluscs in the family Liotiidae.

== Distribution ==
This marine genus occurs off New South Wales, South Australia, Tasmania, Victoria and Western Australia. Some species are endemic to New Zealand. Munditia meridionalis occurs in subantarctic waters off the South Orkney Islands and the South Shetland Islands

== Species ==
Species within the genus Munditia include:

- Munditia anomala Powell, 1940
- Munditia aupouria Powell, 1937
- Munditia daedala (A. Adams, 1863)
- Munditia delicatula Powell, 1940
- Munditia echinata Powell, 1937
- Munditia gaudens (Melvill & Standen, 1912)
- Munditia hedleyi (Prichard & Gatliff, 1899)
- Munditia manawatawhia Powell, 1937
- Munditia mayana (Tate, 1899)
- Munditia meridionalis (Melvill & Standen, 1912)
- Munditia owengaensis Powell, 1933
- †Munditia proavita Laws, 1936
- Munditia serrata (Suter, 1908)
- Munditia subquadrata (Tenison-Woods, 1878)
- Munditia suteri (Mestayer, 1919)
- Munditia tasmanica (Tenison-Woods, 1875)
- Munditia tryphenensis Powell, 1926

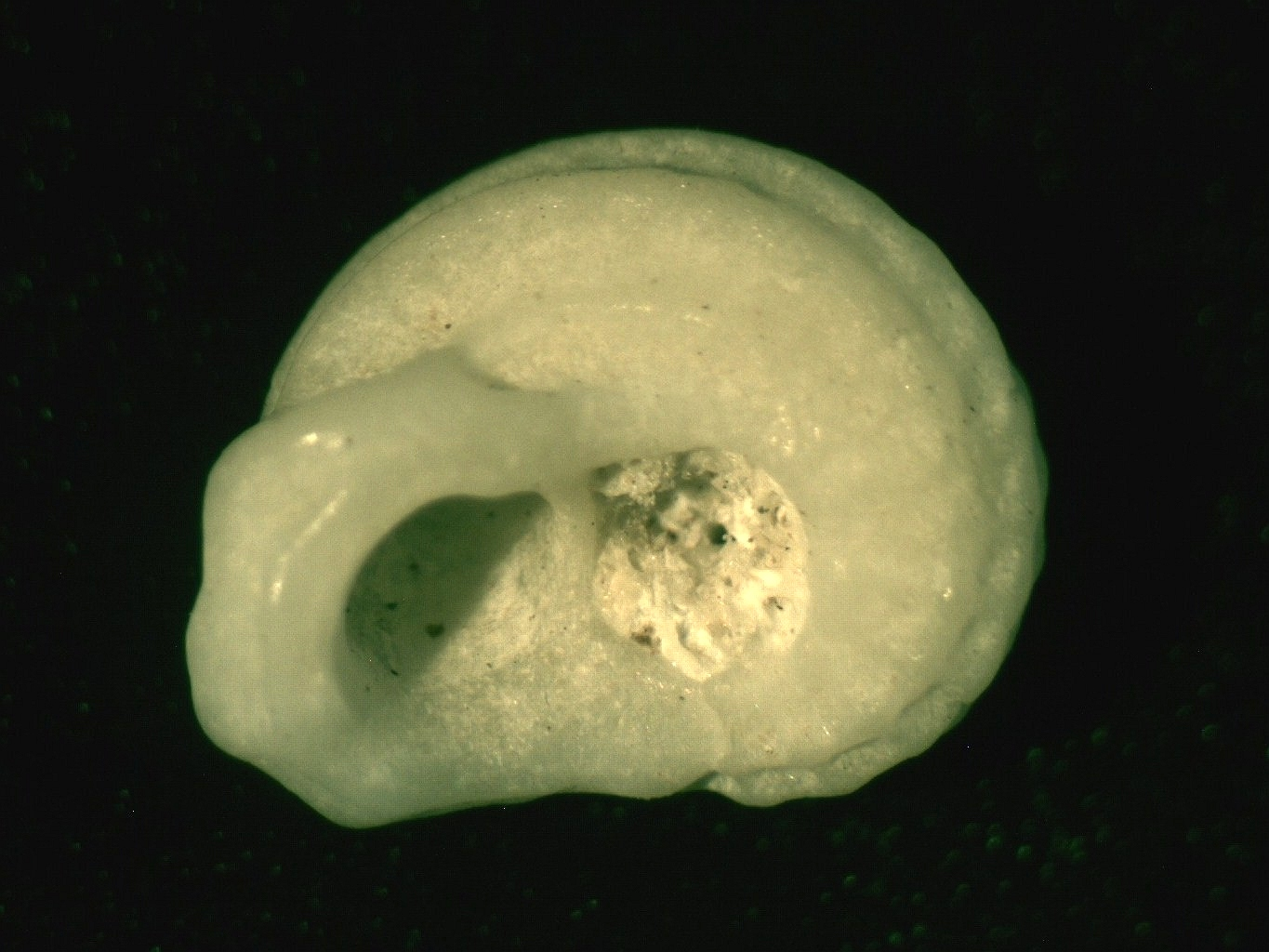
Munditia subquadrata, ventral view

Species brought into synonymy

- Munditia immaculata Tenison-Woods, J.E., 1877: synonym of Munditia subquadrata (Tenison-Woods, 1878)
- Munditia siderea Angas, G.F., 1865: synonym of Munditia tasmanica (Tenison-Woods, 1875)
