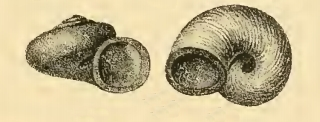
- Drawing with two views of a shell of Liotia atomus

Scientific classification
- Kingdom: Animalia
- Phylum: Mollusca
- Class: Gastropoda
- Subclass: Vetigastropoda
- Order: Trochida
- Superfamily: Trochoidea
- Family: Liotiidae
- Subfamily: Liotiinae
- Genus: Liotia
- Species: L. atomus

Binomial name
- Liotia atomus Issel, 1869

Synonyms
- Cyclostrema atomus (Issel, 1869)

= Liotia atomus =

Species of gastropod

Liotia atomus is a species of small sea snail, a marine gastropod mollusk, in the family Liotiidae.

== Description ==
The diameter of the shell is 1.5 mm. The somewhat solid shell is narrowly umbilicated. It is greenish and a little shining. It is obliquely longitudinally striate. The 4½ slightly convex whorls enlarge rapidly. The body whorl is subangulated at the base. The umbilical area is longitudinally crispate. The continuous peristome is thickened.

== Distribution ==
This marine species occurs off Suez, Red Sea.
