= Munditia daedala =

Scientific classification
- Kingdom: Animalia
- Phylum: Mollusca
- Class: Gastropoda
- Subclass: Vetigastropoda
- Order: Trochida
- Superfamily: Trochoidea
- Family: Liotiidae
- Genus: Munditia
- Species: M. daedala

Binomial name
- Munditia daedala (A. Adams, 1863)

Species of gastropod

Munditia daedala is a species of small sea snail, a marine gastropod mollusk, in the family Liotiidae.

== Distribution ==
This marine species occurs off Japan.
