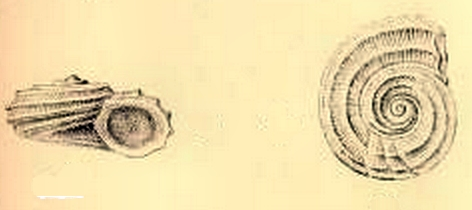
- Drawing with two views of Lodderia novemcarinata

Scientific classification
- Kingdom: Animalia
- Phylum: Mollusca
- Class: Gastropoda
- Subclass: Vetigastropoda
- Order: Trochida
- Family: Skeneidae
- Genus: Lodderia; Tate, 1899

Type species
- Lodderia lodderae Petterd, W.F., 1884

Species
- See text

Synonyms
- Circulus (Lodderia) Tate, 1899

= Lodderia =

Lodderia Temporal range: Miocene to Recent

Genus of gastropods

Lodderia is a genus of minute sea snails or micromolluscs, marine gastropod molluscs in the family Skeneidae. This genus belonged previously to the family Liotiidae.

== Description ==
The shell has a depressed turbinate shape and a deep umbilicus. The sculpture consists of a number of spiral keels. The circular aperture is oblique and shows a prominent varix. The peristome is continuous. The white operculum is multispiral with a central nucleus.

== Species ==
Species within the genus Lodderia include:

- Lodderia coatsiana (Melvill & Standen, 1912)
- Lodderia eumorpha (Suter, 1908)
  - Lodderia eumorpha cookiana (Dell, 1952)
  - Lodderia eumorpha eumorpha (Suter, 1908)
- Lodderia iota (Powell, 1940)
- Lodderia lodderae Petterd, 1884
- † Lodderia mandulana C. Beets, 1984
- Lodderia novemcarinata (Melvill, 1906)
- Lodderia waitemata (Powell, 1940)

Species brought into synonymy

- Lodderia virginiae (Jousseaume, 1872): synonym of Cyclostrema virginiae Jousseaume, 1872
