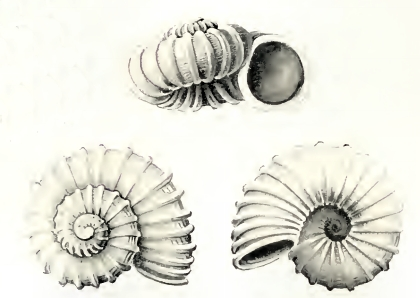
- Original drawing with three views of a shell of Liotella petalifera

Scientific classification
- Kingdom: Animalia
- Phylum: Mollusca
- Class: Gastropoda
- Subclass: Vetigastropoda
- Order: Trochida
- Family: Skeneidae
- Genus: Liotella
- Species: L. petalifera

Binomial name
- Liotella petalifera (Hedley & May, 1908)

Synonyms
- Chunula petalifera (Hedley & May, 1908); Liotella gravicosta Laseron, 1954; Liotia petalifera Hedley & May, 1908 (original description)

= Liotella petalifera =

Species of gastropod

Liotella petalifera is a species of sea snail, a marine gastropod mollusk in the family Skeneidae.

== Description ==
(Original description by Hedley & May) The height of the shell attains 0.6 mm, its diameter 1.2 mm. The minute, white shell has a subdiscoidal shape. Its spire is very little elevated. The base of the shell is broadly and deeply umbilicate. The shell contains 4 whorls, of which two constitute the protoconch, the last descending, and in slight contact with its predecessor. The protoconch is smooth, helicoid, and sharply defined. The sculpture of the shell shows in the body whorl twenty-four, in the penultimate whorl nineteen, elevated curled and forwardly-directed lamellae, whose broad summits nearly equal their interstices. The lamellae are smooth and glossy, but the interstices are distantly spirally striated. The aperture is complete circular.

== Distribution ==
This marine species is endemic to Australia and occurs off Queensland to South Australia and off Tasmania, at depths between 73 m and 183 m.
