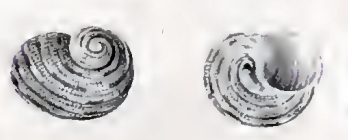
- Original drawing with two views of a shell of Liotella cancellata

Scientific classification
- Kingdom: Animalia
- Phylum: Mollusca
- Class: Gastropoda
- Subclass: Vetigastropoda
- Order: Trochida
- Family: Skeneidae
- Genus: Liotella
- Species: L. cancellata

Binomial name
- Liotella cancellata (Krauss, 1848)

Synonyms
- Stomatella ? cancellata Krauss, 1848

= Liotella cancellata =

Species of gastropod

Liotella cancellata is a species of sea snail, a marine gastropod mollusk in the family Skeneidae.

== Description ==
(Original description by Ferdinand Krauss) The umbilicate shell has an orbicular shape. It is convex, solid, gray-whitish with dirty red stripes. The transverse ribs are blunt. The irregular, longitudinal striae are slender. The curve of the penultimate whorl is canceled. The shell has a prominent spire, acute at the apex;. The four whorls increase in size The body whorl has 26-28 ribs, of which 8-10 are larger, the penultimate whorl only 8, including 3 - 4 larger. These form a lattice with numerous, oblique, longitudinal threads. These are more prominent above but closer to the aperture they become weaker. The oblique aperture is small and almost rounded. The margin of the columella is slightly subreflexed; The umbilicus is smooth.

== Distribution ==
This marine species occurs off Cape of Good Hope, South Africa.
