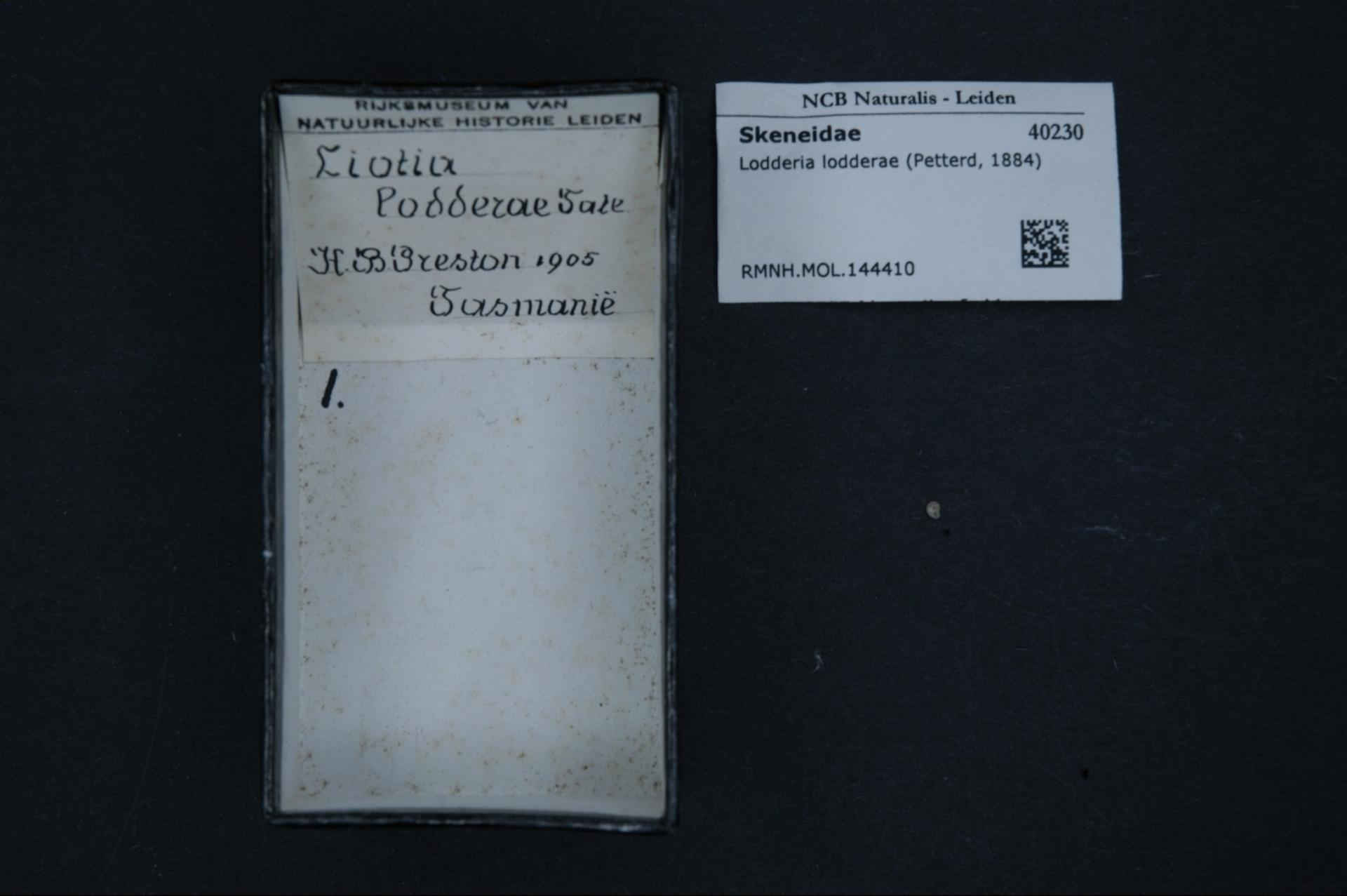
- Preserved Specimen - Lodderia lodderae (Petterd, 1884)

Scientific classification
- Kingdom: Animalia
- Phylum: Mollusca
- Class: Gastropoda
- Subclass: Vetigastropoda
- Order: Trochida
- Superfamily: Trochoidea
- Family: Skeneidae
- Genus: Lodderia
- Species: L. lodderae

Binomial name
- Lodderia lodderae (Petterd, 1884)

Synonyms
- Circulus (Lodderia) lodderae (Petterd, 1884); Liotia lodderae Petterd, W. 1884

= Lodderia lodderae =

Species of gastropod

Lodderia lodderae, common name Lodder's liotia, is a minute sea snail or micromollusc, a marine gastropod mollusc in the family Skeneidae.

== Description ==
The diameter of the shell attains 2 mm. The small, white shell has a discoidal shape. The 4½ whorls are ornamented with several spiral subobsolete lirae. The umbilicus is open. The aperture is almost circular, reflexed and thickened. It is recognized by the strong concentric keels and the absence of transverse sculpture.

== Distribution ==
This marine species is endemic to Australia. It is common and occurs off New South Wales, Victoria, South Australia and Tasmania.
