= Lodderia mandulana =

Scientific classification
- Kingdom: Animalia
- Phylum: Mollusca
- Class: Gastropoda
- Subclass: Vetigastropoda
- Order: Trochida
- Superfamily: Trochoidea
- Family: Skeneidae
- Genus: Lodderia
- Species: L. mandulana

Binomial name
- Lodderia mandulana C. Beets, 1984

Species of gastropod

Lodderia mandulana is a minute, fossil sea snail or micromollusc, a marine gastropod mollusc in the family Skeneidae.

== Description ==
The length of the shell attains 1.6 mm, its diameter 3 mm.

== Distribution ==
This fossil marine species is found in the Mandul Marl Formation of the Mandul Island, northeast of Kalimantan Island.
