= Munditia serrata =

Scientific classification
- Kingdom: Animalia
- Phylum: Mollusca
- Class: Gastropoda
- Subclass: Vetigastropoda
- Order: Trochida
- Family: Liotiidae
- Genus: Munditia
- Species: M. serrata

Binomial name
- Munditia serrata (Suter, 1908)

Synonyms
- Liotia serrata Suter, 1908

Species of gastropod

Munditia serrata is a minute sea snail, a marine gastropod mollusc in the family Liotiidae.

== Description ==
(Original description by Henry Suter) The height of the shell attains 0.5 mm, its diameter 2.5 mm. The rather solid, umbilicated, white shell is small and has a discoidal shape. The sculpture consists of minute fine and slightly wavy radiate riblets. The periphery of the flat whorls is adorned with distant sharp denticles. The base has on the outside a spiral carina, with low and rounded tubercles. The margin of the umbilicus is more or less crenulate. The spire is flat. The protoconch is very small and consists of one flat whorl only. The 3½ whorls increase rapidly. They are flat above, with a pronounced angle at the periphery, and a rounded carina below. The space between them is convex. The base is flat. The suture is impressed, with the serrate processes extending over it. The circular aperture is slightly oblique. The peristome is continuous, with a callous varix. The columella is arcuate, with an outer tubercle at its base. The umbilicus is rather large and deep. The operculum is not seen.

== Distribution ==
This marine species is endemic to New Zealand. It has been found at Little Barrier Island, New Zealand.
