= Liotella elegans =

Scientific classification
- Kingdom: Animalia
- Phylum: Mollusca
- Class: Gastropoda
- Subclass: Vetigastropoda
- Order: Trochida
- Family: Skeneidae
- Genus: Liotella
- Species: L. elegans

Binomial name
- Liotella elegans Laseron, 1958

Synonyms
- Chunula elegans (Laseron, 1958)

Species of gastropod

Liotella elegans is a species of sea snail, a marine gastropod mollusk in the family Skeneidae,.

== Distribution ==
This marine species occurs off the Northern Territory, Australia.
