= Liotella mackenae =

Scientific classification
- Kingdom: Animalia
- Phylum: Mollusca
- Class: Gastropoda
- Subclass: Vetigastropoda
- Order: Trochida
- Family: Skeneidae
- Genus: Liotella
- Species: L. mackenae

Binomial name
- Liotella mackenae Dell, 1956

Species of gastropod

Liotella mackenae is a species of minute sea snail, a marine gastropod mollusc in the family Skeneidae.

== Description ==
The height of the shell attains 1.3 mm, its diameter 1.6 mm.

== Distribution ==
This marine species is endemic to New Zealand and occurs off the Chatham Islands.
