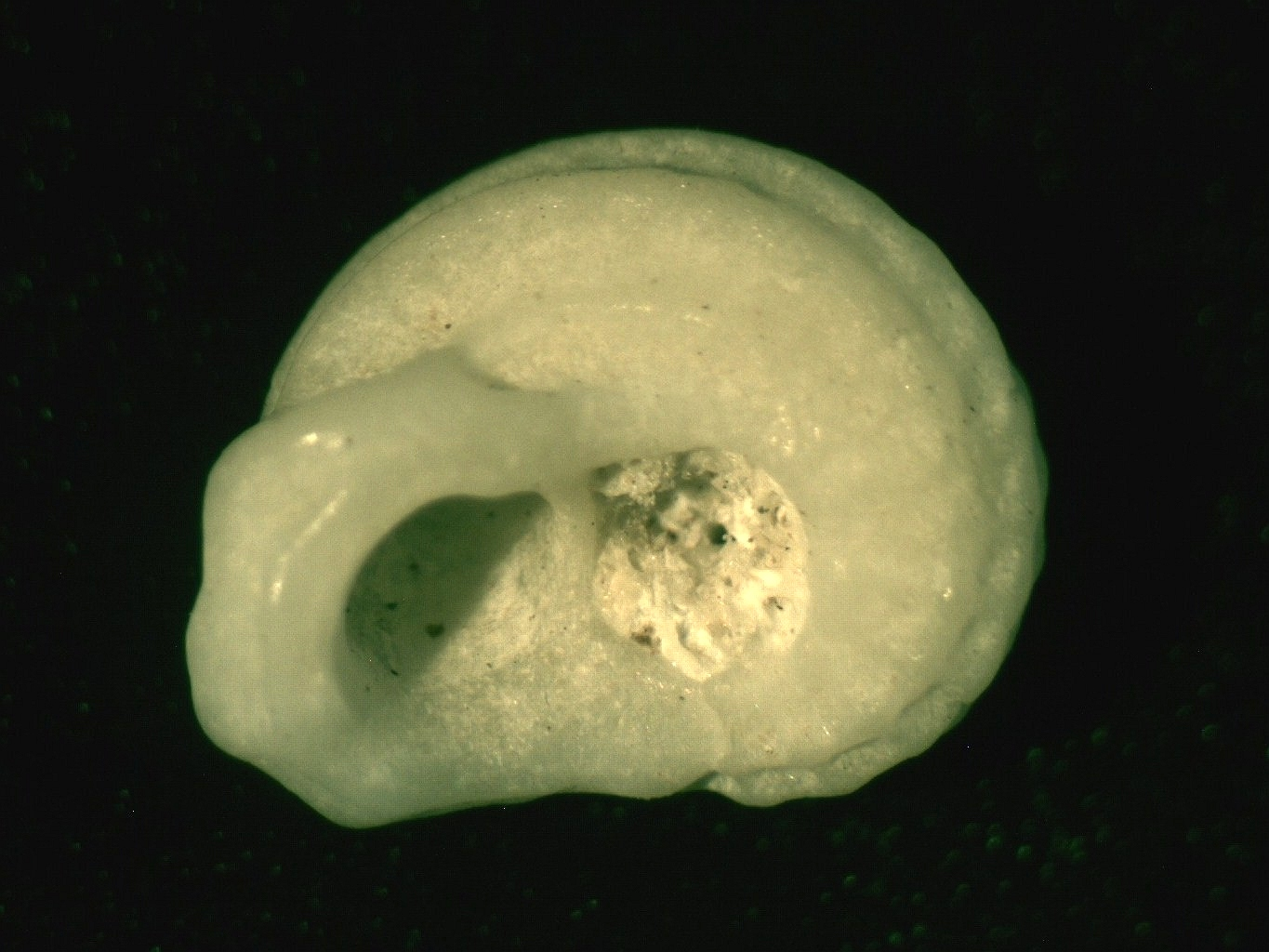
- Munditia subquadrata (Tenison-Woods, 1878), a sea snail in the family Liotiidae; South Australia

Scientific classification
- Kingdom: Animalia
- Phylum: Mollusca
- Class: Gastropoda
- Subclass: Vetigastropoda
- Order: Trochida
- Superfamily: Trochoidea
- Family: Liotiidae
- Genus: Munditia
- Species: M. subquadrata

Binomial name
- Munditia subquadrata (Tenison Woods, 1878)

Synonyms
- Cyclostrema immaculata Tenison-Woods, 1877; Liotia subquadrata Tenison-Woods, 1878; Munditia immaculata Tenison-Woods, J.E., 1877

= Munditia subquadrata =

Species of gastropod

Munditia subquadrata, common name the squared munditia, is a species of small sea snail, a marine gastropod mollusk, in the family Liotiidae.

== Description ==
The size of the shell varies between 3.5 mm and 6.5 mm. The Tasmanian specimen attains a diameter of 9 mm. The small, white, thickly shell has a discoid shape. It is flattened above. It is very finely undulately striate all over. The four whorls are angular above, coronate and radiately ribbed, rounded below, and furnished with two rounded obsolete granular keels. The umbilicus is very ample, with an elegantly dentate margin. The orbicular aperture is toothed.

== Distribution ==
This marine species is endemic to Australia. It occurs off South Australia, Tasmania, Victoria and Western Australia.
