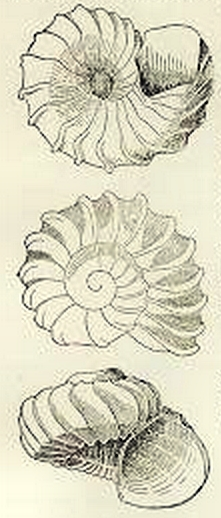
- Original drawing with three views of a shell of Liotella polypleura

Scientific classification
- Kingdom: Animalia
- Phylum: Mollusca
- Class: Gastropoda
- Subclass: Vetigastropoda
- Order: Trochida
- Family: Skeneidae
- Genus: Liotella
- Species: L. polypleura

Binomial name
- Liotella polypleura (Hedley, 1904)

Synonyms
- Liotia polypleura Hedley, 1904

= Liotella polypleura =

Species of gastropod

Liotella polypleura is a minute species of minute sea snail, a marine gastropod mollusc in the family Skeneidae.

== Description ==
The height of the shell is 0.6 mm, its diameter 0.9 mm. The minute, thin, white shell has a turbinate shape. It is widely umbilicate. The spire is slightly umbilicate. The three whorls are loosely coiled. The body whorl contains 16 thick, prominent ribs that cross the whorl, slender on leaving the suture. They slant forward, thickening rapidly, but when turning they descend the periphery perpendicularly. On the base they bend and then taper and rapidly curve into the umbilicus, crenelating its margin. The interstices are smooth. The ribs on the penultimate whorl gradually vanish and the first whorl and a half is smooth. The subquadrate aperture is almost free. The peristome is formed by one of the ribs.

== Distribution ==
This marine species is endemic to New Zealand.
