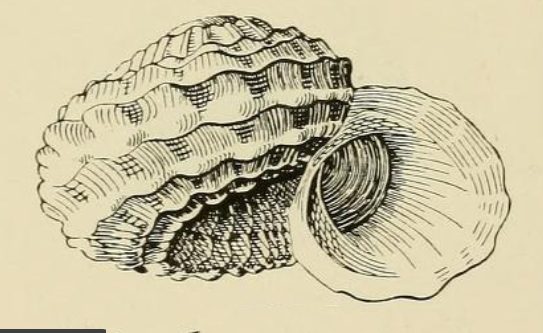
- Shell of Munditia mayana (holotype)

Scientific classification
- Kingdom: Animalia
- Phylum: Mollusca
- Class: Gastropoda
- Subclass: Vetigastropoda
- Order: Trochida
- Superfamily: Trochoidea
- Family: Liotiidae
- Genus: Munditia
- Species: M. mayana

Binomial name
- Munditia mayana (Tate, 1899)

Synonyms
- Liotia mayana Tate, R. 1899

= Munditia mayana =

Species of gastropod

Munditia mayana, common name May's munditia, is a species of small sea snail, a marine gastropod mollusk, in the family Liotiidae.

== Description ==
The size of the shell varies between 4 mm and 8 mm.

(Original description) In size and general appearance, this species resembles Liotia subquadrata. However, the suture is not excavated, the aperture is not so explanulately thickened, and its columella-margin is detached from the umbilical rim.

Its affinity is, however, greater with Liotia clathrata. Liotia clathrata has three lirae of equal size on the periphery instead of them gradually diminishing in strength from above downwards. Additionally, its ribs are more elevated, imbricating, and closer.

In Munditia mayana, the body whorl is more rounded, and the keels are less elevated, presenting with four instead of three on the periphery. The posterior whorls feature three, not two, keels, and the keel at the suture is nodular, not spinulose.

== Distribution ==
This marine species is endemic to Australia. It occurs off South Australia, Tasmania, Victoria and Western Australia.
