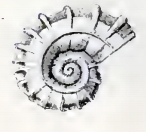
- Drawing with a top view of a shell of Cyclostrema cancellatum

Scientific classification
- Kingdom: Animalia
- Phylum: Mollusca
- Class: Gastropoda
- Subclass: Vetigastropoda
- Order: Trochida
- Family: Liotiidae
- Genus: Cyclostrema
- Species: C. cancellatum

Binomial name
- Cyclostrema cancellatum Marryat, 1818

Synonyms
- Delphinula cancellata Kiener, L.C., 1838; Liotia (Lipistes) acrilla Dall, W.H., 1889

= Cyclostrema cancellatum =

Species of gastropod

Cyclostrema cancellatum is a species of sea snail, a marine gastropod mollusk in the family Liotiidae. It was described by novelist and Royal Navy Captain Frederick Marryat.

== Description ==
The size of the shell varies between 8 mm and 15 mm. The white, sublenticular shell is flattened convex above, more convex below. It contains oblique radiating riblets, interrupted by an obtuse peripheral rib The interstices of the riblets are finely spirally striated. The umbilicus has a moderate size.

(Description by W.H. Dall) The thin, white shell has a planorboid shape with 3½ whorls. The radiating sculpture consists of about fifteen ridges, faint on the base and summit, making small nodules where they cross the fine spirals, and prominent and strong on the periphery between the three peripheral carinae. Other radiations are only due to lines of growth which are sometimes slightly elevated. The spiral sculpture consists of three prominent and strong peripheral ridges, of which the uppermost forms the chief periphery. The others are slightly nearer the axis. Between these, nearly square deep reticulations are formed by the radiating ridges before described. Beside these there are three faint spirals on the upper and three on the basal surface, nodulated at their intersections with the radii. There is an ample umbilicus. The inner margin of the aperture is nearly circular, the outer part modified by the sculpture.

== Distribution ==
This species occurs in the Caribbean Sea, the Gulf of Mexico and the Lesser Antilles; in the Atlantic Ocean from southeast Florida to Brazil at depths between 0 m and 2012 m. Found in the Cayman Islands.
