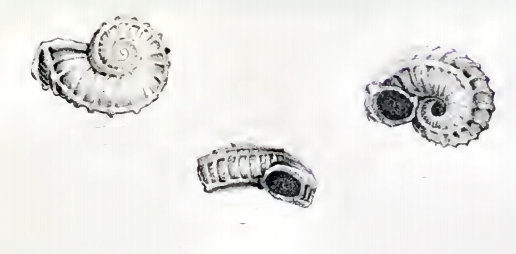
- Original drawing with three views of a shell of Munditia hedleyi

Scientific classification
- Kingdom: Animalia
- Phylum: Mollusca
- Class: Gastropoda
- Subclass: Vetigastropoda
- Order: Trochida
- Superfamily: Trochoidea
- Family: Liotiidae
- Genus: Munditia
- Species: M. hedleyi

Binomial name
- Munditia hedleyi (Pritchard & Gatliff, 1899)

Synonyms
- Liotia hedleyi Pritchard, G.B. & Gatliff, J.H. 1899

= Munditia hedleyi =

Species of gastropod

Munditia hedleyi is a species of small sea snail, a marine gastropod mollusk, in the family Liotiidae.

== Description ==
(Original description by Pritchard & Gatliff) The height of the shell attains 2 mm, its diameter 4 mm. The discoid shellcontains three and a half whorls. The body whorl is angulated by the uppermost of three prominent spiral keels, which are crossed by about twenty well-defined transverse ridges, causing distinct serration of the keel, from an apical aspect. These ridges are directed obliquely backwards, only slightly noticeable between the suture and first keel, more distinct between that and the second, and continuing so to the umbilical keel. The interstices are under the lens finely striated, the striae running parallel to the ridges. These fine striae cause interference with the light, giving rise to iridescence when viewed obliquely.

The aperture is circular and continuous. The lip is broadly margined, the margin being sculptured in a manner similar to the other portion of the body whorl. The shell is widely umbilicated, the umbilicus is carinated, the area between the carination and keel concave. The shell is a uniform cream colour, slightly tinted with brown. The operculum is concentric, of uniform thickness, concave and shelly on the exterior, which is faintly granular. It is horny on its inner face. (described as Liotia hedleyi )

== Distribution ==
This marine species is endemic to Australia. It is found off South Australia, Tasmania and Victoria
