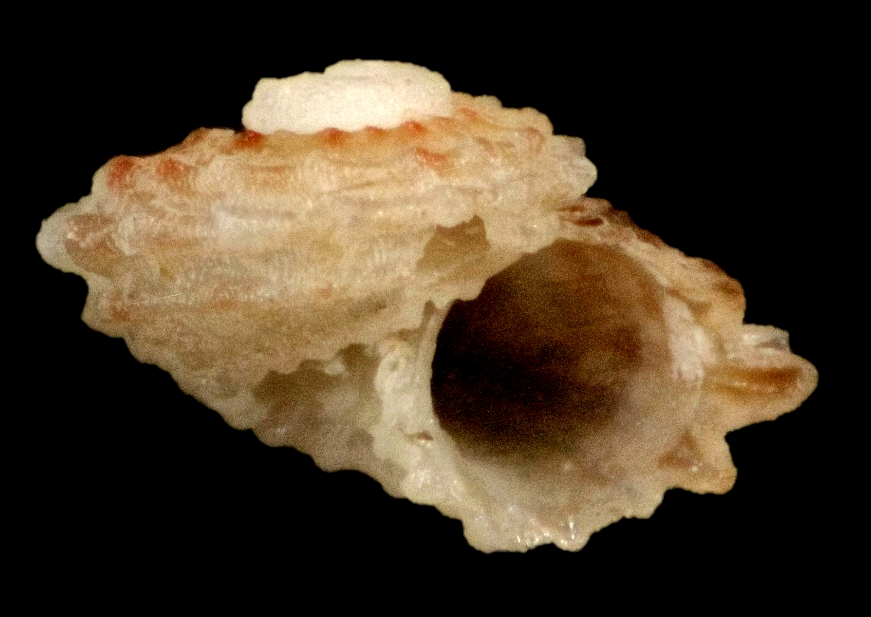
- Shell of Arene briarea (specimen at Naturalis Biodiversity Center)

Scientific classification
- Kingdom: Animalia
- Phylum: Mollusca
- Class: Gastropoda
- Subclass: Vetigastropoda
- Order: Trochida
- Family: Areneidae
- Genus: Arene
- Species: A. briarea

Binomial name
- Arene briarea (Dall, 1881)

Synonyms
- Liotia (Arene) briareus (Dall, 1881) superseded combination; Liotia (Arene) briareus var. aspina Dall, 1889 junior subjective synonym; Liotia (Arene) briareus var. perforata Dall, 1889 junior subjective synonym; Turbo (Liotia) briareus Dall, 1881 superseded combination; Turbo briareus Dall, 1881 superseded combination

= Arene briarea =

Species of gastropod

Arene briarea is a species of sea snail, and is a known member of the group turban snails. It is a marine gastropod mollusc in the family Areneidae and order Trochida.

== Description ==
The size of the shell varies between 4 mm and 9 mm. The species has a purple-orangish tint.

(Original description) The small shell is elevated, comprising five rounded whorls culminating in an obtuse apex. The shell substance is thick and solid, exhibiting a pearly interior.

The protoconch is flattened, lemon-yellow, and has an appearance similar to a small Angaria Röding, 1798. The subsequent shell may be whitish with the backs of the spines streaked with rose-color, or the entire shell (excluding the protoconch) may be of a darker shade of rose.

The protoconch has transverse ridges. The following 1½ whorls are covered with spiny rugosities that are spirally arranged. The remaining whorls feature a complex sculpture of revolving ridges and spines. Superior whorls (above the periphery) bear four to five close-set revolving ridges armed with hollow spines up to a millimeter long (or less). These spines resemble little curved tubes, slit down on the anterior side, but can sometimes appear dwarfed, thickened, and stunted. A thread bearing smaller spines runs just below the periphery (or appears at the suture in earlier whorls). Internal to this thread are three strong, closely nodulated ribs.

The umbilical area is defined by a very pronounced, coarsely nodulated umbilical rib. Internal to this rib are three rows of small spines that twist into the umbilicus.

The entire shell surface is furthermore covered with growth lines that rise into elegantly imbricated (overlapping) scales. These scales are regular on the base but irregular on the superior surface, where their irregularity creates a shagreened (granular) effect.

The aperture is circular and becomes thickened in the adult. The umbilicus's walls are smooth above the rows of spines, but the twisting of the whorl results in the proper perforation being very small.

== Distribution ==
The species lives in the tropical to polar areas of the northern hemisphere. The species occurs in the Caribbean Sea and the Gulf of Mexico; in the Atlantic Ocean off Northern Brazil.
