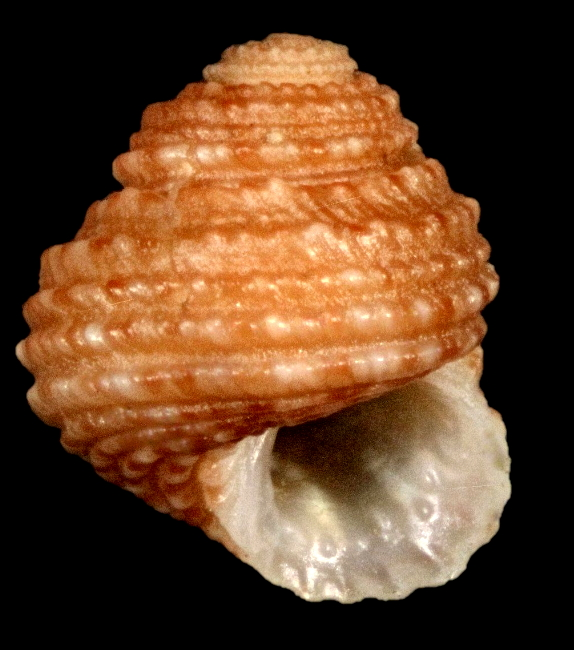
- Shell of Arene bairdii (specimen at Naturalis Biodiversity Center)

Scientific classification
- Kingdom: Animalia
- Phylum: Mollusca
- Class: Gastropoda
- Subclass: Vetigastropoda
- Order: Trochida
- Family: Areneidae
- Genus: Arene
- Species: A. bairdii

Binomial name
- Arene bairdii (Dall, 1889)

Synonyms
- Liotia bairdii Dall, 1889 superseded combination; Liotia bairdii trullata Dall, 1889 junior subjective synonym; Liotia bairdii var. trullata Dall, 1889 junior subjective synonym; Liotia trullata Dall, 1889 junior subjective synonym

= Arene bairdii =

Species of gastropod

Arene bairdii is a species of sea snail, a marine gastropod mollusc in the family Areneidae.

== Description ==
The shell can grow up to be 3.5 mm to 8 mm in length.

(Original description) The shell is small and fusiform, composed of five post-nuclear whorls and an initial small, smooth protoconch. The spire is slightly tabulated, defined by a channelled suture and a central, smaller spiral ridge situated between two larger superior ridges.

The sculpture of the whorls is dominated by noduled, revolving ridges and a faint, fine surface sculpture that follows the incremental growth lines. There are 11 prominent spiral ridges on the body whorl n, grouped as: six basal, two peripheral, and three superior revolving ridges. The largest of the basal spirals is the outermost one, which is separated from others by wide channels.

The aperture in the adult shell shows only a slight reflection of the margin and almost no varix. The margin is machicolated (notched) by the squared ends of the strong spiral ridges. The umbilicus is small, rounded at the base's entrance. Internally, the umbilicus contains a single, rounded spiral ridge, but is devoid of spines or nodules.

The shell is whitish, often covered entirely or in patches by a dull, livid red. The operculum is horny.

== Distribution ==
Arene bairdii can be found from the Southeast USA to South Brazil.
