= Astrosansonia dautzenbergi =

Scientific classification
- Kingdom: Animalia
- Phylum: Mollusca
- Class: Gastropoda
- Subclass: Caenogastropoda
- Order: incertae sedis
- Family: Pickworthiidae
- Genus: Astrosansonia
- Species: A. dautzenbergi

Binomial name
- Astrosansonia dautzenbergi (Bavay, 1917)

Synonyms
- Liotia dautzenbergi Bavay, 1917

Species of sea snail

Astrosansonia dautzenbergi is a species of small sea snail, a marine gastropod mollusc, in the family Pickworthiidae.

== Distribution ==
This species occurs in the Western Pacific Ocean off Wallis Islands.
