= Lodderia iota =

Scientific classification
- Kingdom: Animalia
- Phylum: Mollusca
- Class: Gastropoda
- Subclass: Vetigastropoda
- Order: Trochida
- Superfamily: Trochoidea
- Family: Skeneidae
- Genus: Lodderia
- Species: L. iota

Binomial name
- Lodderia iota (Powell, 1940)

Species of gastropod

Lodderia iota is a minute sea snail or micromollusc, a marine gastropod mollusc in the family Skeneidae.

== Description ==
The height of the shell attains 0.55 mm, its diameter 0.65 mm.

== Distribution ==
This marine species occurs off New Zealand.
