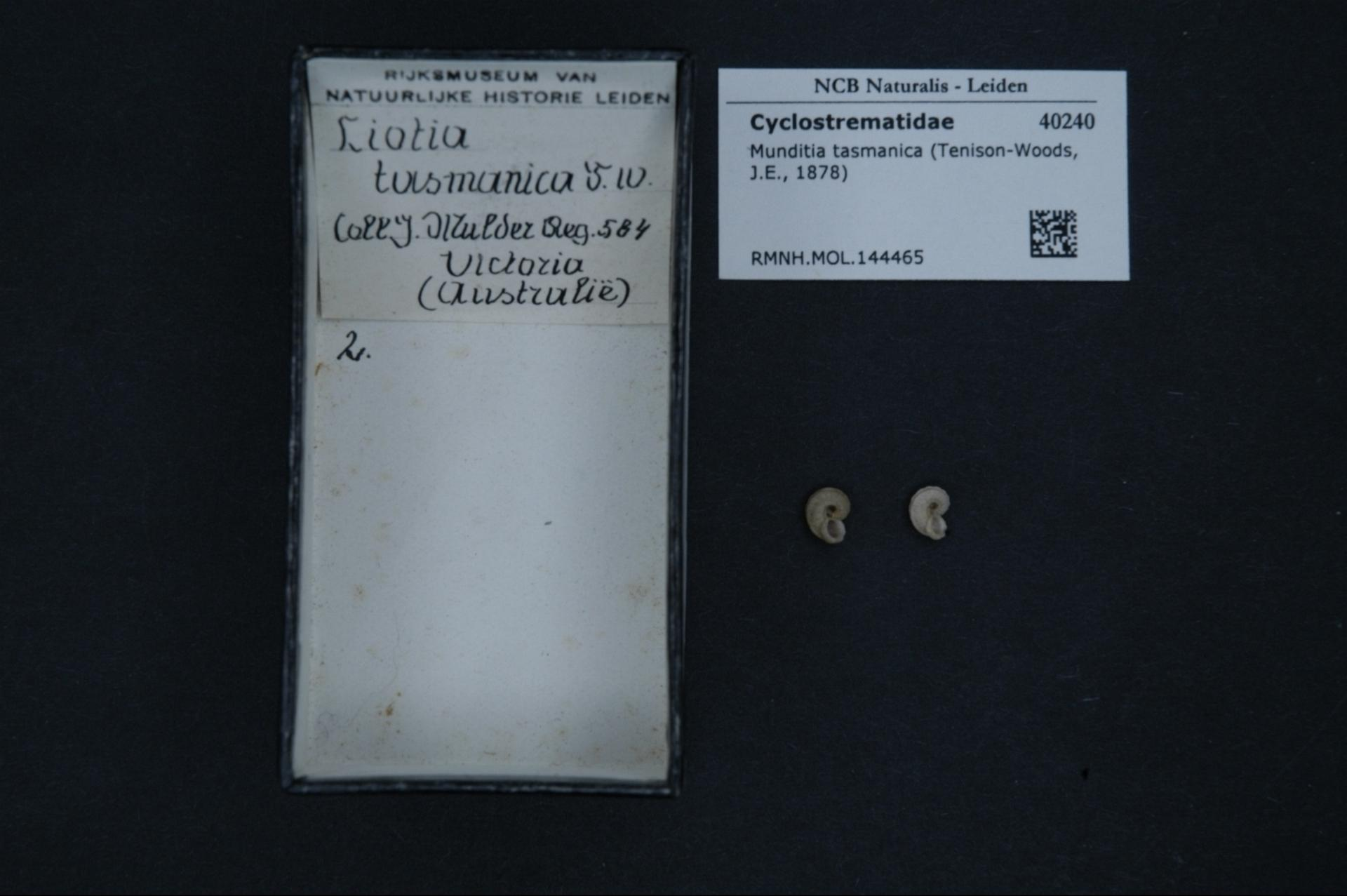
- Preserved Specimen - Munditia tasmanica (Tenison-Woods, J.E., 1878)

Scientific classification
- Kingdom: Animalia
- Phylum: Mollusca
- Class: Gastropoda
- Subclass: Vetigastropoda
- Order: Trochida
- Superfamily: Trochoidea
- Family: Liotiidae
- Genus: Munditia
- Species: M. tasmanica

Binomial name
- Munditia tasmanica (Tenison Woods, 1875)

Synonyms
- Liotia incerta Tenison-Woods, 1877; Liotia siderea Angas, 1865; Liotia tasmanica Tenison-Woods, 1875; Munditia siderea Angas, G.F., 1865

= Munditia tasmanica =

Species of gastropod

Munditia tasmanica, common name the Tasmanian liotia, is a species of small sea snail, a marine gastropod mollusk, in the family Liotiidae.

== Description ==
(Original description by J.E. Tenison-Woods) The height of the shell attains 3 mm, its diameter 8 mm. The small, sordidly white shell has a discoid shape. The spire is plano-depressed, ornamented thickly with spiral sub-obsolete ribs and longitudinal lirae, with two nodose keels at the periphery. The nodes in the second whorl are raised and imbricated. The nodes on the upper carina become little raised hollow rounded squamae on the second whorl. The aperture has a reflexed and thickened margin. The umbilicus is very wide and spirally dentate. This shell is nacreous within.

== Distribution ==
This marine species is endemic to Australia. It occurs off New South Wales, South Australia, Tasmania and Victoria
