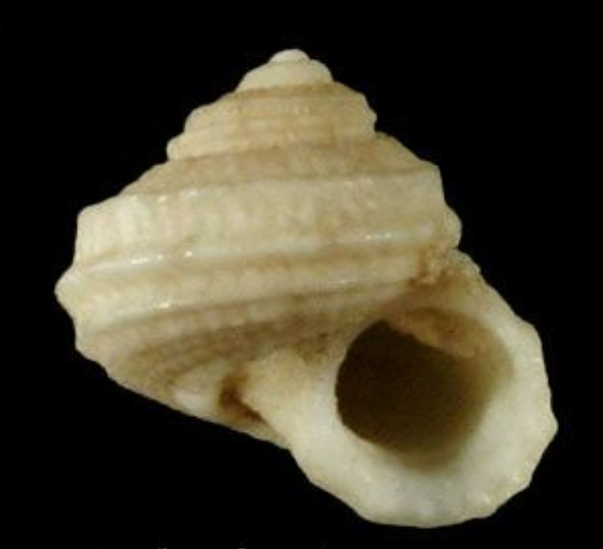
- Shell of Arene tricarinata (specimen at the Natural History Museum, Rotterdam)

Scientific classification
- Kingdom: Animalia
- Phylum: Mollusca
- Class: Gastropoda
- Subclass: Vetigastropoda
- Order: Trochida
- Family: Areneidae
- Genus: Arene
- Species: A. tricarinata

Binomial name
- Arene tricarinata (Stearns, 1872)

Synonyms
- Architectonica tricarinata Stearns, 1872 (original combination); Liotia tricarinata (Stearns, 1872); Marevalvata tricarinata (Stearns, 1872)

= Arene tricarinata =

Species of gastropod

Arene tricarinata is a species of sea snail, a marine gastropod mollusk in the family Areneidae.

== Description ==
The shell can grow to be 3 mm to 12 mm in length.

(Original description) The small, solid shell is trochiform, and moderately elevated. It is composed of four whorls, each distinctly angulated. The body whorl features three prominent, evenly spaced, revolving ribs along its periphery, while the whorl above bears two similar ribs. The suture is well-defined and occasionally accompanied by a subtle, subnodose rib. The aperture is circular, with a markedly thickened peritreme. The umbilicus is deep and strongly crenulated.

The shell is white in color, typically adorned with irregular spots and blotches of light red or dark umber.

Specimen, examined by the original author, s exhibit variation in both sculpture and coloration. In one individual, the sutural rib is as prominently developed as the other spiral ribs. In all specimens examined, the sutural rib is interrupted into subtle nodules, which, along with the crenulations of the umbilicus, are regularly marked with dark umber pigmentation. Some individuals also display faint riblets on the external surface of the outer lip, which gradually merge into the general shell surface.

== Distribution ==
Arene tricarinata can be found from North Carolina to Colombia and Northeast Brazil.
