= Arene lurida =

Scientific classification
- Kingdom: Animalia
- Phylum: Mollusca
- Class: Gastropoda
- Subclass: Vetigastropoda
- Order: Trochida
- Superfamily: Trochoidea
- Family: Areneidae
- Genus: Arene
- Species: A. lurida

Binomial name
- Arene lurida (Dall, 1913)

Synonyms
- Liotia lurida Dall, 1913

Species of gastropod

Arene lurida is a species of sea snail, a marine gastropod mollusk in the family Areneidae.

== Description ==
The height of the shell attains 4.5 mm and its diameter 5.5 mm.

(Original description) The small shell has a dull red or purplish-brown color. It is more or less reticulated on the ridges. It contains about four and a half whorls. The minute nucleus is flattish. The body whorl contains four strong, beaded, spiral cords with subequal interspaces, peripherally. Between these and the suture, there are three slightly smaller similar cords, the space at the suture giving a channeled effect. On the base there are two less prominent cords and two wider nodulous ridges around the deep, rather narrow umbilicus. The aperture is circular. The thick outer lip is fringed by the ends of the spiral cords. The axial sculpture consists of numerous fine radial threads, most obvious in the channels between the cords. (described as Liotia lurida)

== Distribution ==
This marine species occurs in the Gulf of California.
