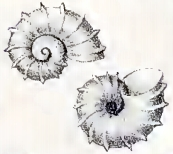
- Drawing with two views of a shell of Liotella annulata

Scientific classification
- Kingdom: Animalia
- Phylum: Mollusca
- Class: Gastropoda
- Subclass: Vetigastropoda
- Order: Trochida
- Family: Skeneidae
- Genus: Liotella
- Species: L. annulata

Binomial name
- Liotella annulata (Tenison-Woods, 1874)

Synonyms
- Liotia annulata Tenison-Woods, J.E. 1879

= Liotella annulata =

Species of gastropod

Liotella annulata is a species of small sea snail, a marine gastropod mollusc in the family Skeneidae.

== Description ==
The diameter of the shell is 1.5 mm. The opaque white shell has a planorbiform shape. It is flattened above, rounded below, with somewhat distant longitudinal lamellae, above and below. Otherwise it is smooth. The umbilicus is wide. One of the ring-like lamellae forms the peristome.

== Distribution ==
This marine species is endemic to Australia and occurs off South Australia and Tasmania.
