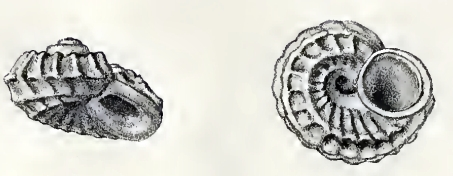
- Original drawing with two views of a shell of Lodderia coatsiana

Scientific classification
- Kingdom: Animalia
- Phylum: Mollusca
- Class: Gastropoda
- Subclass: Vetigastropoda
- Order: Trochida
- Superfamily: Trochoidea
- Family: Skeneidae
- Genus: Lodderia
- Species: L. coatsiana

Binomial name
- Lodderia coatsiana (Melvill & Standen, 1912)

Synonyms
- Liotella coatsiana (Melvill & Standen, 1912); Cyclostrema coatsianum (Melvill & Standen, 1912)

= Lodderia coatsiana =

Species of gastropod

Lodderia coatsiana is a species of sea snail, a marine gastropod mollusk in the family Skeneidae.

== Description ==
The height of the shell attains 2.25 mm. This is a small, solid, white shell with a deep umbilicus, elegantly sculptured. It contains 4 whorls, with two apical sleek, white whorls. The two others are aequicostate with smooth, thickened, subflexuous ribs. The penultimate whorl is very flat. The last whorl has four spiral keels, with a blunt keel below the sutures, two at the periphery. The aperture is round.

== Distribution ==
This marine species occurs in the Magellanic Strait off Argentina at a depth of about 100 m.
