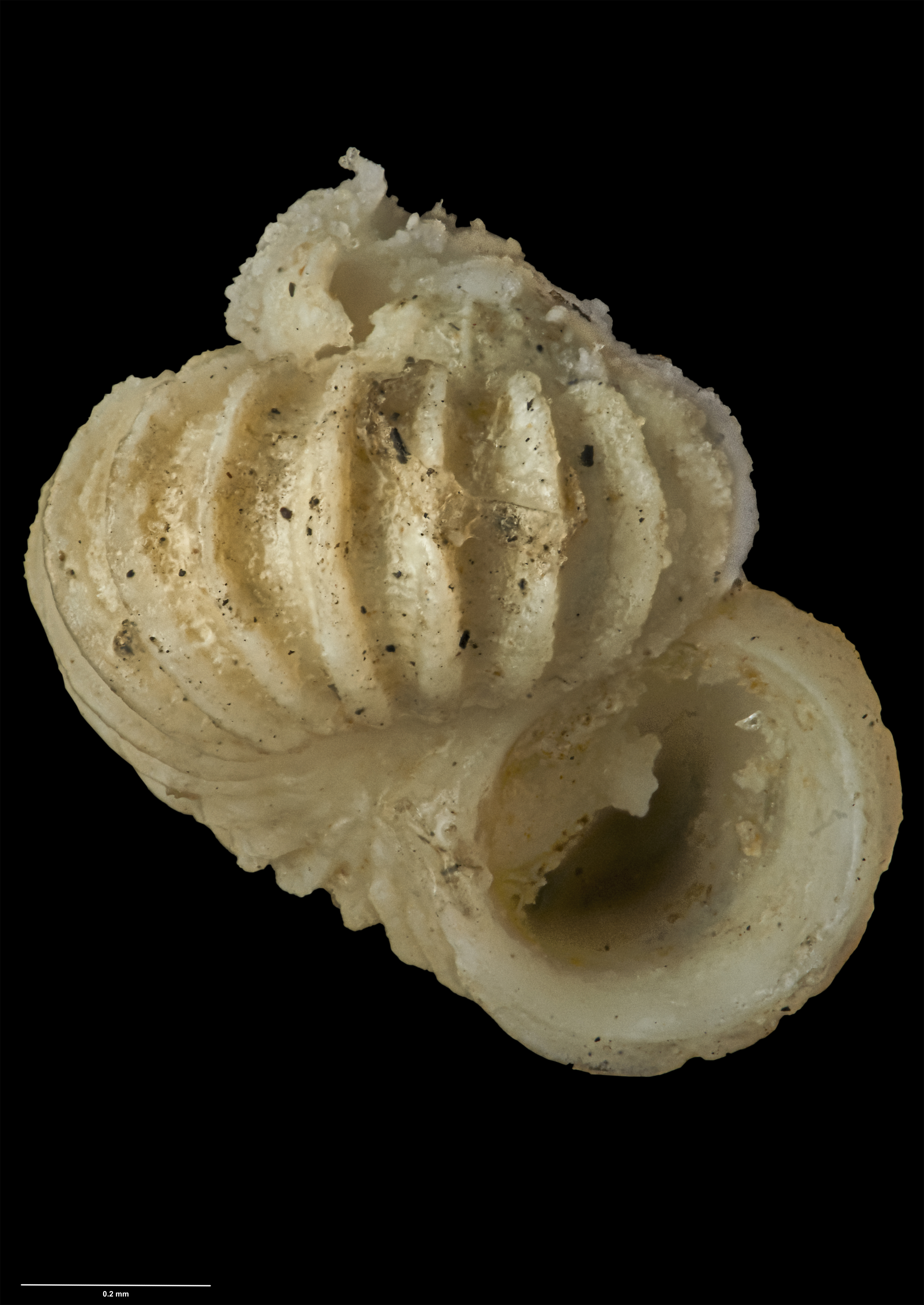
- Brookula contigua

Scientific classification
- Kingdom: Animalia
- Phylum: Mollusca
- Class: Gastropoda
- Subclass: Vetigastropoda
- Superfamily: Seguenzioidea
- Family: incertae sedis
- Genus: Brookula; Iredale, 1912

Type species
- Brookula stibarochila Iredale, T., 1912

Species
- See text

Synonyms
- Benthobrookula A. H. Clarke, 1961; Brookula (Aequispirella) Finlay, 1924

= Brookula =

Genus of gastropods

Brookula is a genus of minute sea snails or micromolluscs, marine gastropod molluscs unassigned in the superfamily Seguenzioidea.

== Species ==
Species within the genus Brookula include:

- Brookula angeli (Tenison-Woods, 1876)
- Brookula annectens Powell, 1937
- Brookula benthicola Dell, 1956
- Brookula bohni Schwabe & Engl, 2008
- Brookula brevis (d'Orbigny, 1841)
- Brookula capensis A. H. Clarke, 1961
- Brookula contigua Powell, 1940
- Brookula crebresculpta (Tate, 1899)
- Brookula decussata (Pelseneer, 1903)
- Brookula densilaminata (Verco, 1907)
- † Brookula endodonta Finlay, 1924
- Brookula finesia Laseron, 1954
- † Brookula fossilis Finlay, 1924
- † Brookula funiculata Finlay, 1924
- Brookula iki Kay, 1979
- Brookula lamonti Clarke, 1961
- Brookula megaumbilicata Absalão & Pimenta, 2005
- Brookula murawskii Fernández-Garcés, Rubio & Rolán, 2018
- Brookula prognata Finlay, 1927
- Brookula proseila Absalão & Pimenta, 2005
- † Brookula pukeuriensis Finlay, 1924
- † Brookula singletoni Chapman & Crespin, 1928
- Brookula spinulata Absalão, R.S., Miyaji & A.D. Pimenta, 2001 - Brazil
- Brookula stibarochila Iredale, 1912
- Brookula tanseimaruae Tsuchida & Hori, 1996

Species brought into synonymy

- Brookula (Aequispirella) Finlay, 1924: synonym of Aequispirella Finlay, 1924
- Brookula (Aequispirella) corula (Hutton, 1885): synonym of Brookula corula (Hutton, 1885)
- Brookula antarctica Dell, 1990: synonym of Brookula strebeli A. W. B. Powell, 1951
- Brookula argentina (Zelaya, Absalão & Pimenta, 2006): synonym of Benthobrookula argentina Zelaya, Absalão & Pimenta, 2006
- Brookula augeria Laseron, 1954: synonym of Brookula angeli (Tenison-Woods, 1877)
- Brookula bifurcata Maxwell, 1992: synonym of Aequispirella bifurcata (P. A. Maxwell, 1992)
- Brookula calypso (Melvill & Standen, 1912): synonym of Benthobrookula calypso (Melvill & Standen, 1912)
- Brookula charleenae (Schwabe & Engl, 2008): synonym of Benthobrookula charleenae (Schwabe & Engl, 2008)
- Brookula conica (R. B. Watson, 1880): synonym of Benthobrookula conica (R. B. Watson, 1880)
- Brookula consobrina May, 1923: synonym of Brookula crebresculpta (Tate, 1899)
- Brookula coronis Barnard, 1963: synonym of Imbricoscelis coronis (Barnard, 1963)
- Brookula corula (Hutton, 1885): synonym of Aequispirella corula (Hutton, 1885)
- Brookula corulum (Hutton, 1885): synonym of Aequispirella corula (Hutton, 1885)
- Brookula crassicostata (Strebel, 1908): synonym of Liotella crassicostata (Strebel, 1908)
- Brookula delli Numanami, 1996: synonym of Brookula pfefferi Powell, 1951
- Brookula enderbyensis Powell, 1931: synonym of Aequispirella enderbyensis (Powell, 1931)
- Brookula exquisita A. H. Clarke, 1961: synonym of Benthobrookula exquisita (A. H. Clarke, 1961)
- Brookula finlayi Powell, 1933: synonym of Aequispirella finlayi (Powell, 1933)
- Brookula galapagana (Dall, 1913): synonym of Vetulonia galapagana (Dall, 1913)
- Brookula gemmula (Turton, 1932): synonym of Benthobrookula gemmula (Turton, 1932)
- Brookula iredalei Finlay, 1924: synonym of Aequispirella iredalei (Finlay, 1924)
- Brookula jacksonensis Laseron, 1954: synonym of Brookula nepeanensis (Gatliff, 1906)
- Brookula kaawaensis Laws, 1940: synonym of Aequispirella kaawaensis (Laws, 1940)
- Brookula kerguelensis (Thiele, 1925): synonym of Benthobrookula kerguelensis (Thiele, 1925)
- Brookula meridionale (Melvill & Standen, 1912): synonym of Munditia meridionalis (Melvill & Standen, 1912)
- Brookula nepeanensis (Gatliff, 1906): synonym of Benthobrookula nepeanensis (Gatliff, 1906)
- Brookula obscura Laseron, 1954: synonym of Brookula angeli (Tenison-Woods, 1877)
- Brookula olearia Absalão & Pimenta, 2005: synonym of Benthobrookula olearia (Absalão & Pimenta, 2005)
- Brookula orospatia Laseron, 1954: synonym of Brookula angeli (Tenison-Woods, 1877)
- Brookula paranaensis (Zelaya, Absalão & Pimenta, 2006): synonym of Benthobrookula paranaensis Zelaya, Absalão & Pimenta, 2006
- Brookula pfefferi Powell, 1951: synonym of Benthobrookula pfefferi (A. W. B. Powell, 1951)
- Brookula polypleura (Hedley, 1904): synonym of Liotella polypleura (Hedley, 1904)
- Brookula powelli Clarke, 1961: synonym of Benthobrookula powelli (A. H. Clarke, 1961)
- Brookula rossiana Dell, 1990: synonym of Brookula pfefferi Powell, 1951
- Brookula sinusbreidensis Numanami & Okutani, 1991: synonym of Brookula pfefferi Powell, 1951
- Brookula strebeli A. W. B. Powell, 1951: synonym of Benthobrookula strebeli (A. W. B. Powell, 1951)
- Brookula tenuilirata Finlay, 1924: synonym of Aequispirella tenuilirata (Finlay, 1924)
- Brookula tumida Laseron, 1954: synonym of Brookula angeli (Tenison-Woods, 1877)
- Brookula turbinata Laseron, 1954: synonym of Brookula angeli (Tenison-Woods, 1877)
