= Aequispirella finlayi =

Scientific classification
- Kingdom: Animalia
- Phylum: Mollusca
- Class: Gastropoda
- Subclass: Vetigastropoda
- Family: incertae sedis
- Genus: Aequispirella
- Species: A. finlayi

Binomial name
- Aequispirella finlayi (A. W. B. Powell, 1933)

Synonyms
- Brookula finlayi Powell, 1933; Brookula (Aequispirella) finlayi Powell, 1933

Species of gastropod

Aequispirella finlayi is a species of sea snail, a marine gastropod mollusc in the superfamily Seguenzioidea, currently unassigned to a family. The species is endemic to New Zealand, found in the Chatham Islands and off the northern coast of the North Island.

== Description ==
In the original description, Powell described the species as follows:

Shell minute, elevated-turbinate, thin, narrowly perforate, white, translucent, shining. Whorls 4 1/2, including a bluntly rounded but moderately elevated smooth globose protoconch of 1 1/4 whorls. Spire tall, 1 1/2 times height of aperture. Sculpture consisting of numerous narrow but prominent axial ribs with the interspaces four to six times the width of the ribs. These interspaces are crossed by less conspicuous sculpture of fine spiral threads. There are 21 axials on the penultimate and 27 on the body-whorl. The number of axials in corulum, averaged from four topotypes, is 28 for the penultimate and 32.5 for the body-whorl. The spirals number six on the early spire whorls and about ten on the penultimate. On the base the axials become weaker, finishing abruptly before reaching the umbilicus, and the spirals are more numerous and closely spaced, they, likewise, terminating just before reaching the umbilical cavity. Umbilicus narrow but deep. Aperture circular, peristome continuous, thin and sharp.

The holotype of the species measures 1.3 mm (0.051 in) in height and 0.95 mm (0.037 in) in diameter. The species has spiral threats that cross the whorls on the shell, with approximately 10 found on the penultimate whorl. Both the axials and spirals finish abruptly at the umbilicus. The umbilicus is narrow and deeply crescentic. Powell noticed similarities between the species and Aequispirella corula, but can be differentiated due to A. finlayi has more narrowly conical apical whorls, as well as fewer axial ribs and a much wider body-whorl. The species has a taller spire than A. enderbyensis.

== Taxonomy ==
A. finlayi was first described by A.W.B. Powell in 1933, using the name Brookula (Aequispirella) finlayi. The holotype was collected from a depth of 18 m (59 ft) off the coast of Owenga in the Chatham Islands by Powell himself in February 1933. Aequispirella, while originally a subgenus of Brookula, has been treated as a genus since at least 2009, after which the accepted name for the species became Aequispirella finlayi.

== Distribution and habitat ==
The species is endemic to New Zealand, found in the waters of the Chatham Islands, and off the coast of the northern North Island including Manawatāwhi / Three Kings Islands to the northwest, and some areas of the west coast including Boulder Bay on the Manukau Harbour.

A. finyali is known to occur underneath rocks on shorelines, as well as areas further off the coast.
