= Benthobrookula =

Scientific classification
- Kingdom: Animalia
- Phylum: Mollusca
- Class: Gastropoda
- Subclass: Vetigastropoda
- Superfamily: Seguenzioidea
- Family: incertae sedis
- Genus: Benthobrookula; A. H. Clarke, 1961

Genus of sea snails

Benthobrookula is a genus of sea snails, marine gastropod mollusks, unassigned in the superfamily Seguenzioidea.

== Species ==
Species within the genus Benthobrookula include:

- Benthobrookula aethiopica (Thiele, 1925)
- Benthobrookula araneum D. G. Herbert, 2024
- Benthobrookula argentina Zelaya, Absalão & Pimenta, 2006
- Benthobrookula calypso (Melvill & Standen, 1912)
- Benthobrookula charleenae (Schwabe & Engl, 2008)
- Benthobrookula conica (R. B. Watson, 1880)
- Benthobrookula exquisita (A. H. Clarke, 1961)
- Benthobrookula galenae D. G. Herbert, 2024
- Benthobrookula gemmula (W. H. Turton, 1932)
- Benthobrookula kerguelensis (Thiele, 1925)
- Benthobrookula laticostata D. G. Herbert, 2024
- Benthobrookula nepeanensis (Gatliff, 1906)
- Benthobrookula olearia (Absalão & Pimenta, 2005)
- Benthobrookula paranaensis Zelaya, Absalão & Pimenta, 2006
- Benthobrookula pfefferi (A. W. B. Powell, 1951)
- Benthobrookula powelli (A. H. Clarke, 1961)
- Benthobrookula scalaroides D. G. Herbert, 2024
- Benthobrookula semisculpta D. G. Herbert, 2024
- Benthobrookula strebeli (A. W. B. Powell, 1951)
- Benthobrookula valdiviae (Thiele, 1925)
