= Brookula decussata =

Scientific classification
- Kingdom: Animalia
- Phylum: Mollusca
- Class: Gastropoda
- Subclass: Vetigastropoda
- Family: incertae sedis
- Genus: Brookula
- Species: B. decussata

Binomial name
- Brookula decussata (Pelseneer, 1903)

Synonyms
- Brookula rossiana Dell, 1990; Brookula sinusbreidensis Numanami & Okutani, 1991; Brookula delli Numanami, 1996; Cyclostrema decussatum Pelseneer, 1903 (original combination)

Species of gastropod

Brookula decussata is a species of sea snail, a marine gastropod mollusk unassigned to the superfamily Seguenzioidea.

This species is considered sometimes a synonym of Brookula pfefferi Powell, A.W.B., 1951, but B. decussata is somewhat smaller and a has a more definite sculpture with fewer spirals and more axials.

== Description ==
The maximum recorded size of the shell is 2.5 mm.

== Distribution ==
This marine species occurs off the South Orkney Islands and off The Antarctic Peninsula.
