= Vetulonia densilirata =

Scientific classification
- Domain: Eukaryota
- Kingdom: Animalia
- Phylum: Mollusca
- Class: Gastropoda
- Subclass: Vetigastropoda
- Superfamily: Seguenzioidea
- Family: incertae sedis
- Genus: Vetulonia
- Species: V. densilirata

Binomial name
- Vetulonia densilirata Dall, 1927

Synonyms
- Brookula densilirata W.H. Dall, 1927

Species of gastropod

Vetulonia densilirata is a species of sea snail, a marine gastropod mollusk, unassigned in the superfamily Seguenzioidea.

== Description ==
The length of the shell attains 2 mm; its diameter: 3 mm.

(Original description) the shell resembles Vetulonia paucivaricosa (Dautzenberg, 1889) but with a depressed, almost flat spire. There are about 35 axial lamellae on the body whorl. The spiral sculpture is finer and closer, and the aperture is almost circular with a continuous margin.

== Distribution ==
This marine species occurs off Florida, USA.
