= Brookula densilaminata =

Scientific classification
- Kingdom: Animalia
- Phylum: Mollusca
- Class: Gastropoda
- Subclass: Vetigastropoda
- Superfamily: Seguenzioidea
- Family: incertae sedis
- Genus: Brookula
- Species: B. densilaminata

Binomial name
- Brookula densilaminata (Verco, 1907)

Species of gastropod

Brookula densilaminata is a species of sea snail, a marine gastropod mollusk, unassigned in the superfamily Seguenzioidea.

== Distribution ==
The height of the shell attains 5 mm.

== Distribution ==
This marine species occurs off Australia.
