= Brookula fossilis =

Scientific classification
- Kingdom: Animalia
- Phylum: Mollusca
- Class: Gastropoda
- Subclass: Vetigastropoda
- Superfamily: Seguenzioidea
- Family: incertae sedis
- Genus: Brookula
- Species: †B. fossilis

Binomial name
- †Brookula fossilis Finlay, 1924

Synonyms
- Brookula (Brookula) fossilis Finlay, 1924

Extinct species of gastropod

Brookula fossilis is an extinct species of sea snail, a marine gastropod mollusk, unassigned in the superfamily Seguenzioidea.
