= Brookula lamonti =

Scientific classification
- Kingdom: Animalia
- Phylum: Mollusca
- Class: Gastropoda
- Subclass: Vetigastropoda
- Superfamily: Seguenzioidea
- Family: incertae sedis
- Genus: Brookula
- Species: B. lamonti

Binomial name
- Brookula lamonti Clarke, 1961

Species of gastropod

Brookula lamonti is a species of sea snail, a marine gastropod mollusk, unassigned in the superfamily Seguenzioidea.

== Description ==
The shell reaches a height of 1.6 mm.

== Distribution ==
This marine species occurs off the South Georgia Islands.
