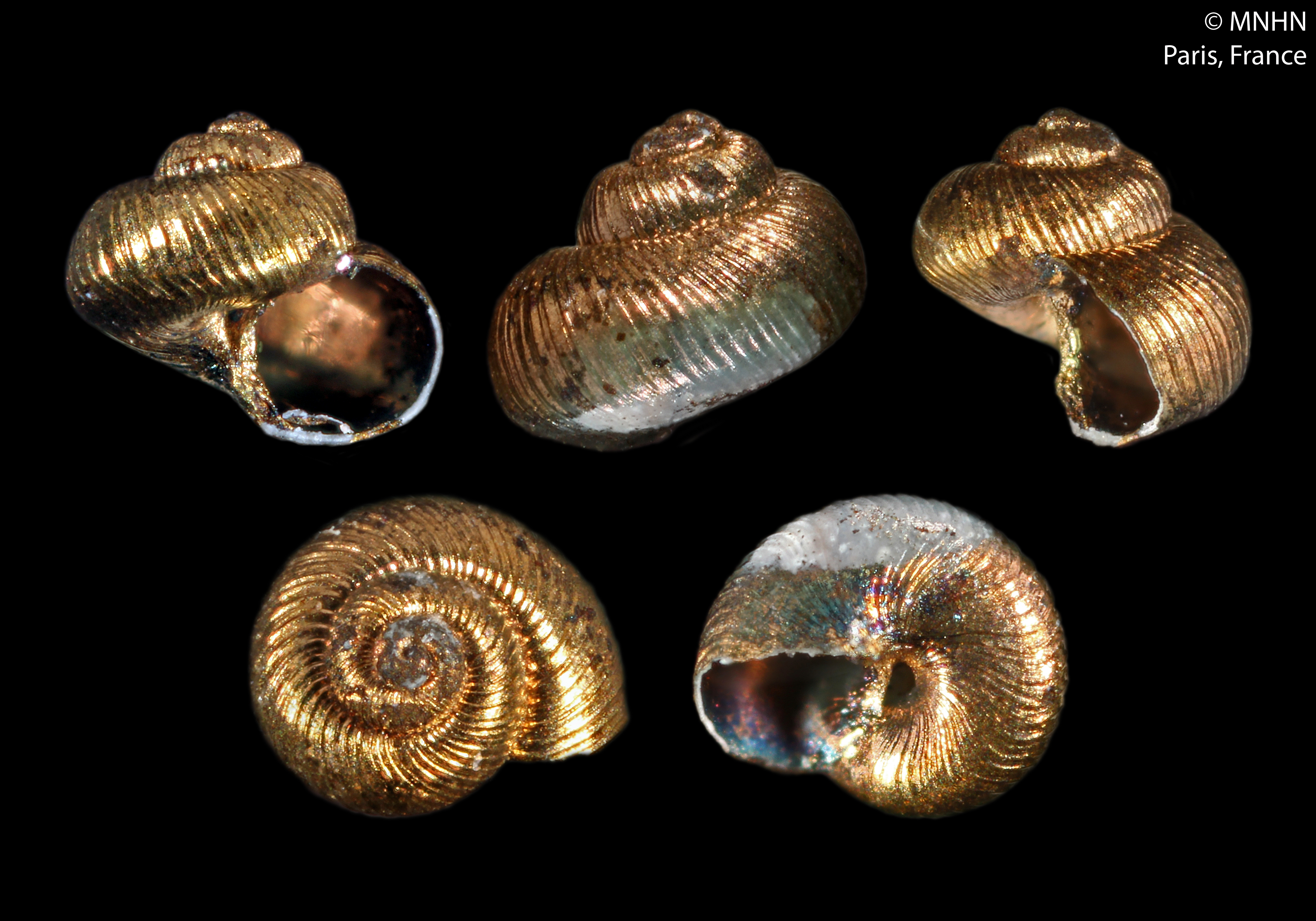
- Shell of Vetulonia phalcata (holotype at MNHN, Paris)

Conservation status
- Vulnerable (IUCN 3.1)

Scientific classification
- Kingdom: Animalia
- Phylum: Mollusca
- Class: Gastropoda
- Subclass: Vetigastropoda
- Superfamily: Seguenzioidea
- Family: incertae sedis
- Genus: Vetulonia
- Species: V. phalcata

Binomial name
- Vetulonia phalcata Warén & Bouchet, 1993

= Vetulonia phalcata =

Species of gastropod

Vetulonia phalcata is a species of sea snail, a marine gastropod mollusk, unassigned in the superfamily Seguenzioidea.

== Distribution ==
This species occurs in North Fiji Basin.
