= Brookula prognata =

Scientific classification
- Domain: Eukaryota
- Kingdom: Animalia
- Phylum: Mollusca
- Class: Gastropoda
- Subclass: Vetigastropoda
- Family: incertae sedis
- Genus: Brookula
- Species: B. prognata

Binomial name
- Brookula prognata Finlay, 1927

Species of gastropod

Brookula prognata is a species of minute sea snail, a marine gastropod mollusc, unassigned in the superfamily Seguenzioidea.

== Distribution ==
This species is found only in the vicinity of the three Kings Islands, New Zealand.
