= Brookula crebresculpta =

Scientific classification
- Domain: Eukaryota
- Kingdom: Animalia
- Phylum: Mollusca
- Class: Gastropoda
- Subclass: Vetigastropoda
- Superfamily: Seguenzioidea
- Family: incertae sedis
- Genus: Brookula
- Species: B. crebresculpta

Binomial name
- Brookula crebresculpta (Tate, 1899)

Synonyms
- Brookula consobrina May, 1923; Brookula turbinata Laseron, 1954; Cyclostrema crebresculptum Tate, 1899

Species of gastropod

Brookula crebresculpta is a species of sea snail, a marine gastropod mollusk, unassigned in the superfamily Seguenzioidea.
