= Brookula megaumbilicata =

Scientific classification
- Kingdom: Animalia
- Phylum: Mollusca
- Class: Gastropoda
- Subclass: Vetigastropoda
- Family: incertae sedis
- Genus: Brookula
- Species: B. megaumbilicata

Binomial name
- Brookula megaumbilicata Absalao & Pimenta, 2005

Synonyms
- Benthobrookula megaumbilicata Absalao & Pimenta, 2005

Species of gastropod

Brookula megaumbilicata is a species of sea snail, a marine gastropod mollusk unassigned in the superfamily Seguenzioidea.

== Description ==
The maximum recorded size of the shell is 1.54 mm.

== Distribution ==
This species occurs in the Atlantic Ocean off Brazil, found at depths between 1,195 m and 1,222 m.
