= Brookula bohni =

Scientific classification
- Kingdom: Animalia
- Phylum: Mollusca
- Class: Gastropoda
- Subclass: Vetigastropoda
- Family: incertae sedis
- Genus: Brookula
- Species: B. bohni

Binomial name
- Brookula bohni Schwabe & Engl, 2008

Species of gastropod

Brookula bohni is a species of sea snail, a marine gastropod mollusk, unassigned in the superfamily Seguenzioidea.

== Description ==
The size of the shell varies between 0.95 mm and 1.3 mm.

== Distribution ==
This marine species occurs off South Shetland Islands and in the Weddell Sea, Antarctica, found at depths between 3,683 m and 3,959 m.
