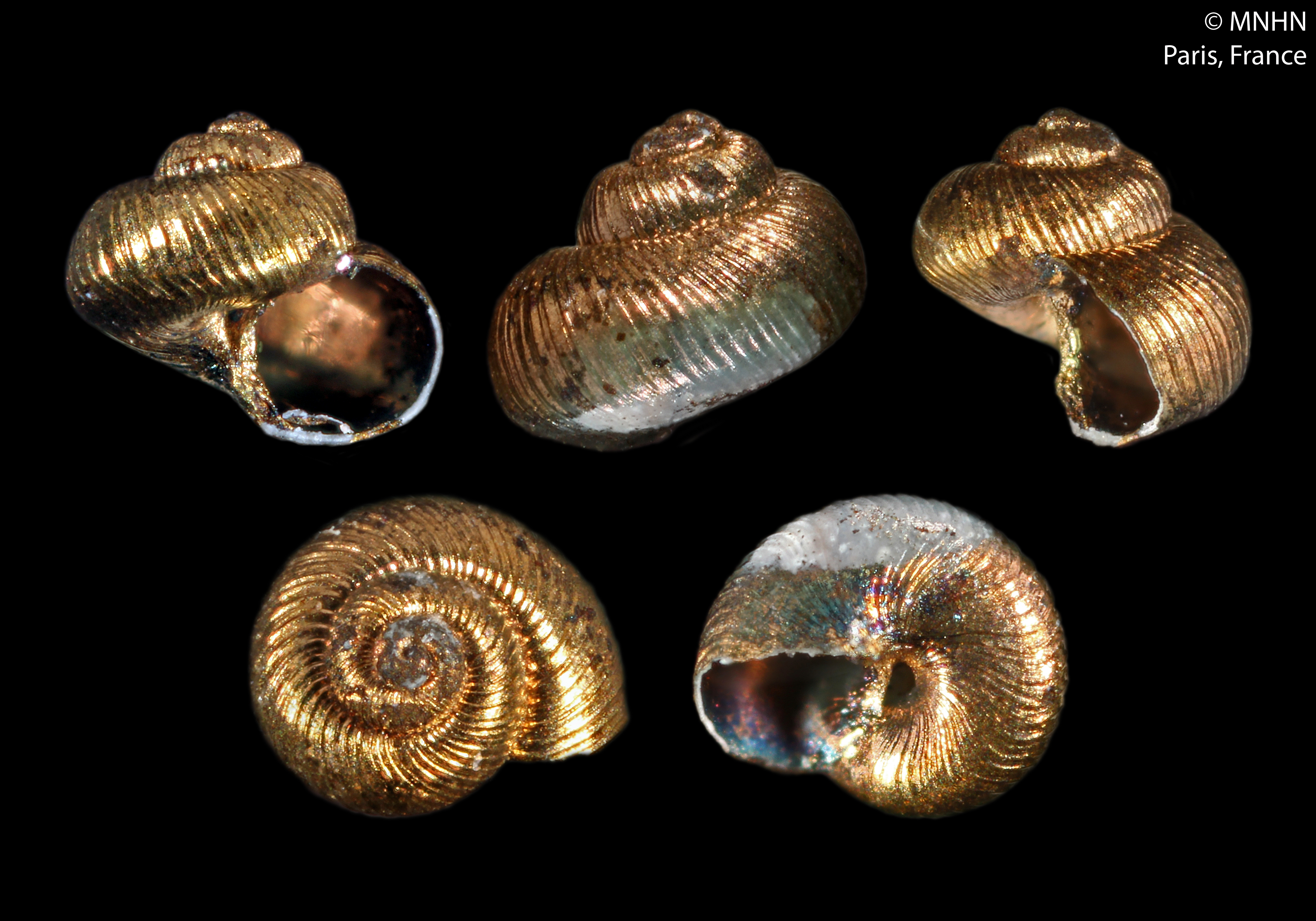
- Shell of Vetulonia phalcata

Scientific classification
- Kingdom: Animalia
- Phylum: Mollusca
- Class: Gastropoda
- Subclass: Vetigastropoda
- Superfamily: Seguenzioidea
- Family: incertae sedis
- Genus: Vetulonia; Dall, 1913

Type species
- Vetulonia galapagana Dall, 1913

= Vetulonia (gastropod) =

Genus of gastropods

Vetulonia is a genus of sea snails, marine gastropod mollusks, unassigned in the superfamily Seguenzioidea.

== Description ==
(Original description) The small shell is turbiniform, thin and umbilicated. It shows radiating ribs crossing spiral threads . The peristome is interrupted by the body whorl . The outer lip in the completely adult is reflected and somewhat thickened. The aperture is unarmed.

== Species ==
Species within the genus Vetulonia include:

- Vetulonia densilirata Dall, 1927
- Vetulonia galapagana Dall, 1913
- Vetulonia giacobbei Renda & Micali, 2016
- Vetulonia parajeffreysi Absalão & Pimenta, 2005
- Vetulonia paucivaricosa (Dautzenberg, 1889)
- Vetulonia phalcata Warén & Bouchet, 1993
- † Vetulonia philippinensis Kiel, Aguilar & Kase, 2020

Species brought into synonymy

- Vetulonia cancellata (Jeffreys, 1883): synonym of Vetulonia paucivaricosa (Dautzenberg, 1889)
- Vetulonia jeffreysi Dall, 1913: synonym of Vetulonia paucivaricosa (Dautzenberg, 1889)
- Vetulonia josephinae Dall, 1927: synonym of Vetulonia paucivaricosa (Dautzenberg, 1889)
