= Brookula finesia =

Scientific classification
- Kingdom: Animalia
- Phylum: Mollusca
- Class: Gastropoda
- Subclass: Vetigastropoda
- Superfamily: Seguenzioidea
- Family: incertae sedis
- Genus: Brookula
- Species: B. finesia

Binomial name
- Brookula finesia Laseron, 1954

Species of gastropod

Brookula finesia is a species of sea snail, a marine gastropod mollusk, unassigned in the superfamily Seguenzioidea.

== Distribution ==
This marine species occurs off New South Wales, Australia.
