= Brookula spinulata =

Scientific classification
- Kingdom: Animalia
- Phylum: Mollusca
- Class: Gastropoda
- Subclass: Vetigastropoda
- Family: incertae sedis
- Genus: Brookula
- Species: B. spinulata

Binomial name
- Brookula spinulata Absalao, Miyaji & Pimenta, 2001

Synonyms
- Benthobrookula spinulata Absalao, Miyaji & Pimenta, 2001

Species of gastropod

Brookula spinulata is a species of sea snail, a marine gastropod mollusk unassigned in the superfamily Seguenzioidea.

== Description ==
The maximum recorded length of the shell is 1.54 mm.

== Biology ==
This species can be either simultaneous hermaphrodites or dioecious, a pattern in all of Vetigastropoda.

== Distribution ==
This species occurs in the Atlantic Ocean off Brazil, found at a depth of 775 m.
