= Brookula proseila =

Scientific classification
- Kingdom: Animalia
- Phylum: Mollusca
- Class: Gastropoda
- Subclass: Vetigastropoda
- Family: incertae sedis
- Genus: Brookula
- Species: B. proseila

Binomial name
- Brookula proseila Absalão & Pimenta, 2005

Synonyms
- Benthobrookula proseila Absalao & Pimenta, 2005

Species of gastropod

Brookula proseila is a species of sea snail, a marine gastropod mollusk unassigned in the superfamily Seguenzioidea.

== Description ==
- Size & shape: A minute, trochiform (turban-shaped) shell with an elevated spire; adults reach ~1.91 mm in height and ~1.67 mm in width; shell color white.
- Protoconch: Globose, ~1 1/2 whorls, ~260 μm in diameter; surface with dense, anastomosing micro-ribs forming tiny alveolar pits (a honeycomb-like micro-sculpture typical for Brazilian Brookula).
- Teleoconch: Up to 3 whorls; whorl profile generally convex but slightly flattened just below a deep suture.
- Axial sculpture: Strong, narrow, orthocline ribs (≈24 on the last whorl in the holotype); interspaces broad (≈3× rib width); fine microscopic axial lines present in the interspaces. Critically, the axial ribs do not enter the umbilicus (see Comparisons).
- Spiral sculpture: About 20 thin, regularly spaced cords on the last whorl plus base; cords cross the axial ribs. Around the umbilicus there are 3–4 stronger spiral cords that surround and enter the umbilical opening.
- Aperture & umbilicus: Aperture rounded, holostomate; outer lip thin. The umbilicus is deep (relatively narrow in outline) and circled by the stronger spiral cords noted above.

== Distribution ==
This species occurs in the Atlantic Ocean off Brazil, found at depths between 50 m and 900 m.
