= Brookula murawskii =

Scientific classification
- Kingdom: Animalia
- Phylum: Mollusca
- Class: Gastropoda
- Subclass: Vetigastropoda
- Superfamily: Seguenzioidea
- Family: incertae sedis
- Genus: Brookula
- Species: B. murawskii

Binomial name
- Brookula murawskii Fernández-Garcés, Rubio & Rolán, 2018

Species of gastropod

Brookula murawskii is a species of sea snail, a marine gastropod mollusk, unassigned in the superfamily Seguenzioidea.

== Distribution ==
This species occurs in Cuban part of the Caribbean Sea.
