= Brookula endodonta =

Scientific classification
- Kingdom: Animalia
- Phylum: Mollusca
- Class: Gastropoda
- Subclass: Vetigastropoda
- Superfamily: Seguenzioidea
- Family: incertae sedis
- Genus: Brookula
- Species: †B. endodonta

Binomial name
- †Brookula endodonta Finlay, 1924

Synonyms
- Brookula (Brookula) endodonta Finlay, 1924

Extinct species of gastropod

Brookula endodonta is an extinct species of sea snail, a marine gastropod mollusk, unassigned in the superfamily Seguenzioidea.
