= Brookula benthicola =

Scientific classification
- Kingdom: Animalia
- Phylum: Mollusca
- Class: Gastropoda
- Subclass: Vetigastropoda
- Family: incertae sedis
- Genus: Brookula
- Species: B. benthicola

Binomial name
- Brookula benthicola Dell, 1956

Species of gastropod

Brookula benthicola is a species of minute sea snail, a marine gastropod mollusc unassigned in the superfamily Seguenzioidea.

== Distribution ==
This species is found near the South Island of New Zealand in deep water.
