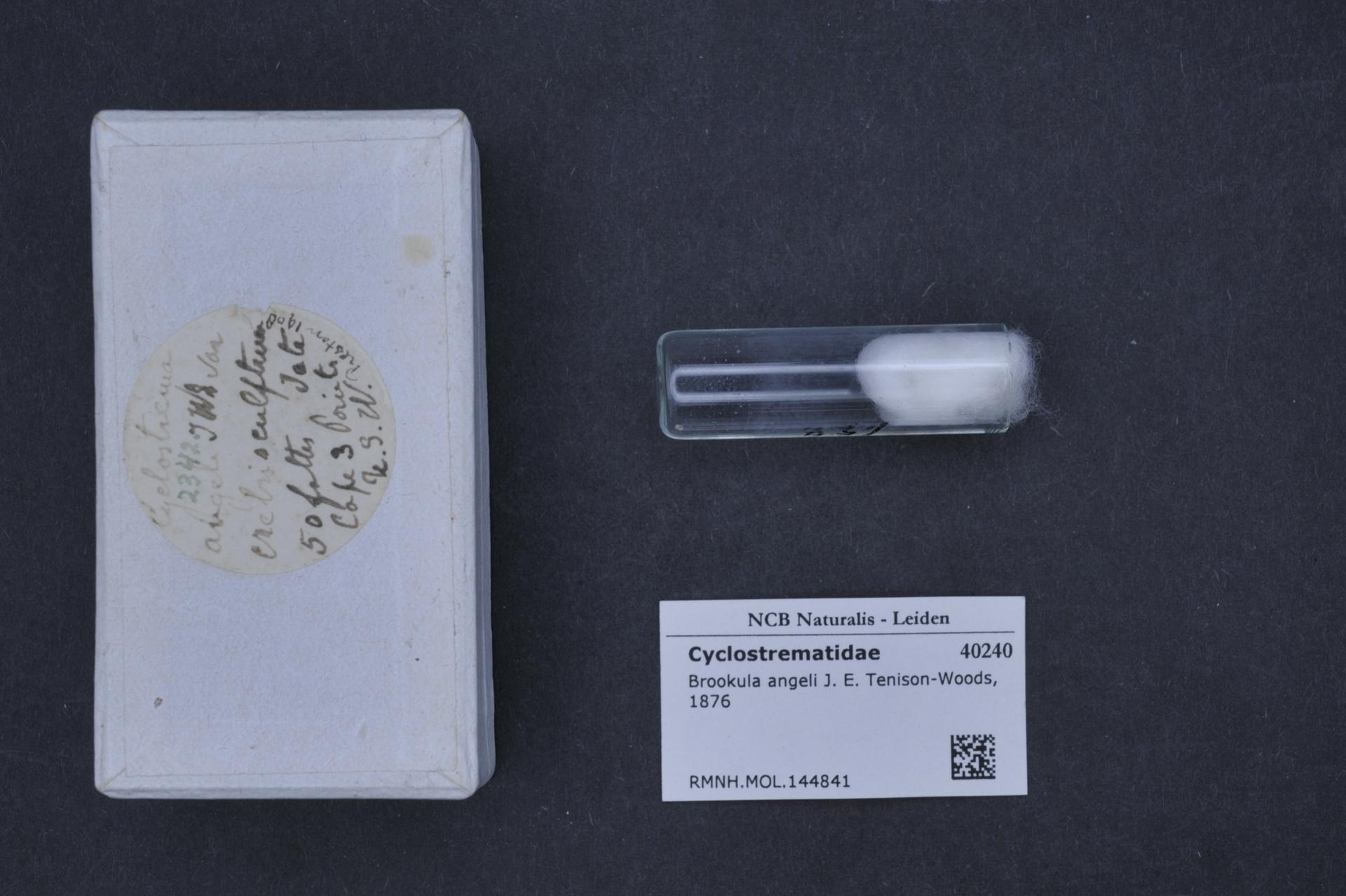
- Brookula angeli J. E. Tenison-Woods, 1876

Scientific classification
- Kingdom: Animalia
- Phylum: Mollusca
- Class: Gastropoda
- Subclass: Vetigastropoda
- Superfamily: Seguenzioidea
- Family: incertae sedis
- Genus: Brookula
- Species: B. angeli

Binomial name
- Brookula angeli (Tenison-Woods, 1876)

Synonyms
- Brookula augeria Laseron, 1954; Brookula obscura Laseron, 1954; Brookula orospatia Laseron, 1954; Brookula tumida Laseron, 1954; Trochus angeli Tenison-Woods, 1876 (original combination)

= Brookula angeli =

Species of gastropod

Brookula angeli is a species of sea snail, a marine gastropod mollusk, unassigned in the superfamily Seguenzioidea.

== Description ==
The height of the shell is 5 mm. The small shell is turbinate, depressed, orbicular, and rather solid. It is sordid white and clouded red. It is irregularly keeled all over, with the interstices finely, irregularly, neatly obliquely lirate, and peculiarly punctate. The larger keels are smooth or obsoletely granular. The five whorls are convex, the last obtusely angular. The base of the shell is flat or slightly convex and spirally lirate with equal lirae and spotted brown. The interstices are transversely neatly striate. The aperture is subquadrate. The outer lip is closely dentate. The throat is conspicuously lirate. The columella is obtusely unidentate. The margin of the umbilicus is regularly tuberculate with rounded granular tubercles.

== Distribution ==
This species occurs off Tasmania, Australia.
