= Brookula tanseimaruae =

Scientific classification
- Domain: Eukaryota
- Kingdom: Animalia
- Phylum: Mollusca
- Class: Gastropoda
- Subclass: Vetigastropoda
- Superfamily: Seguenzioidea
- Family: incertae sedis
- Genus: Brookula
- Species: B. tanseimaruae

Binomial name
- Brookula tanseimaruae Tsuchida & Hori, 1996

Species of gastropod

Brookula tanseimaruae is a species of sea snail, a marine gastropod mollusk, unassigned in the superfamily Seguenzioidea.

== Distribution ==
This species occurs in Japan.
