= Vetulonia parajeffreysi =

Scientific classification
- Kingdom: Animalia
- Phylum: Mollusca
- Class: Gastropoda
- Subclass: Vetigastropoda
- Family: incertae sedis
- Genus: Vetulonia
- Species: V. parajeffreysi

Binomial name
- Vetulonia parajeffreysi Absalão & Pimenta, 2005

Synonyms
- Vetulonia jeffreysi auct. non Dall, 1913; Vetulonia parajefferysi Absalão & Pimenta, 2005 (misspelling)

Species of gastropod

Vetulonia parajeffreysi is a species of sea snail, a marine gastropod mollusk, unassigned in the superfamily Seguenzioidea.

== Description ==
The shell grows to a height of 3 mm.

== Distribution ==
This species occurs in the Gulf of Mexico and in the Atlantic Ocean off Brazil, found at depths between 730 m and 1,600 m.
