= Brookula annectens =

Scientific classification
- Kingdom: Animalia
- Phylum: Mollusca
- Class: Gastropoda
- Subclass: Vetigastropoda
- Family: incertae sedis
- Genus: Brookula
- Species: B. annectens

Binomial name
- Brookula annectens Powell, 1937

Species of gastropod

Brookula annectens is a species of small sea snail, a marine gastropod mollusc, unassigned in the superfamily Seguenzioidea.

== Description ==
The height of the shell reaches 1 mm.

== Distribution ==
This species occurs in the vicinity of the Three Kings Islands, New Zealand.
