= Brookula iki =

Scientific classification
- Kingdom: Animalia
- Phylum: Mollusca
- Class: Gastropoda
- Subclass: Vetigastropoda
- Superfamily: Seguenzioidea
- Family: incertae sedis
- Genus: Brookula
- Species: B. iki

Binomial name
- Brookula iki Kay, 1979

Species of gastropod

Brookula iki is a species of sea snail, a marine gastropod mollusk. unassigned in the superfamily Seguenzioidea.

== Description ==
The height of the shell attains 15 mm.

== Distribution ==
This species is found in the Indian Ocean, specifically off Réunion Island, as well as in the Pacific Ocean off Hawaii.
