= Brookula brevis =

Scientific classification
- Kingdom: Animalia
- Phylum: Mollusca
- Class: Gastropoda
- Subclass: Vetigastropoda
- Superfamily: Seguenzioidea
- Family: incertae sedis
- Genus: Brookula
- Species: B. brevis

Binomial name
- Brookula brevis (d'Orbigny, 1841)

Species of gastropod

Brookula brevis is a species of sea snail, a marine gastropod mollusk, unassigned in the superfamily Seguenzioidea.
