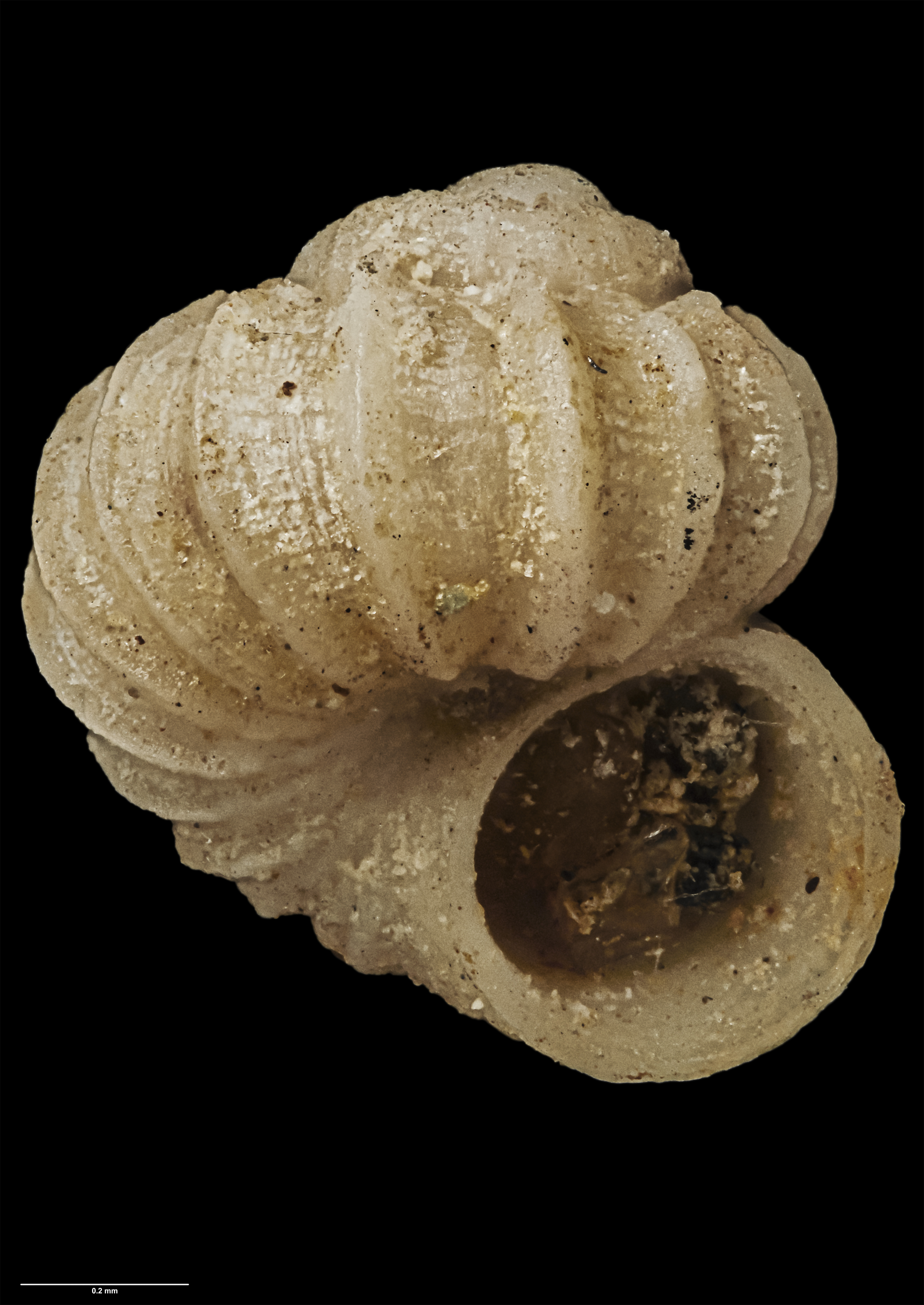

Scientific classification
- Kingdom: Animalia
- Phylum: Mollusca
- Class: Gastropoda
- Subclass: Vetigastropoda
- Superfamily: Seguenzioidea
- Family: incertae sedis
- Genus: Brookula
- Species: †B. funiculata

Binomial name
- †Brookula funiculata Finlay, 1924

Synonyms
- Brookula (Brookula) funiculata Finlay, 1924

= Brookula funiculata =

Extinct species of gastropod

Brookula funiculata is an extinct species of sea snail, a marine gastropod mollusk, unassigned in the superfamily Seguenzioidea.
