= Vetulonia giacobbei =

Scientific classification
- Domain: Eukaryota
- Kingdom: Animalia
- Phylum: Mollusca
- Class: Gastropoda
- Subclass: Vetigastropoda
- Superfamily: Seguenzioidea
- Family: incertae sedis
- Genus: Vetulonia
- Species: V. giacobbei

Binomial name
- Vetulonia giacobbei Renda & Micali, 2016

Species of gastropod

Vetulonia giacobbei is a species of sea snail, a marine gastropod mollusk, unassigned in the superfamily Seguenzioidea.

== Distribution ==
This species occurs in Tyrrhenian Sea.
