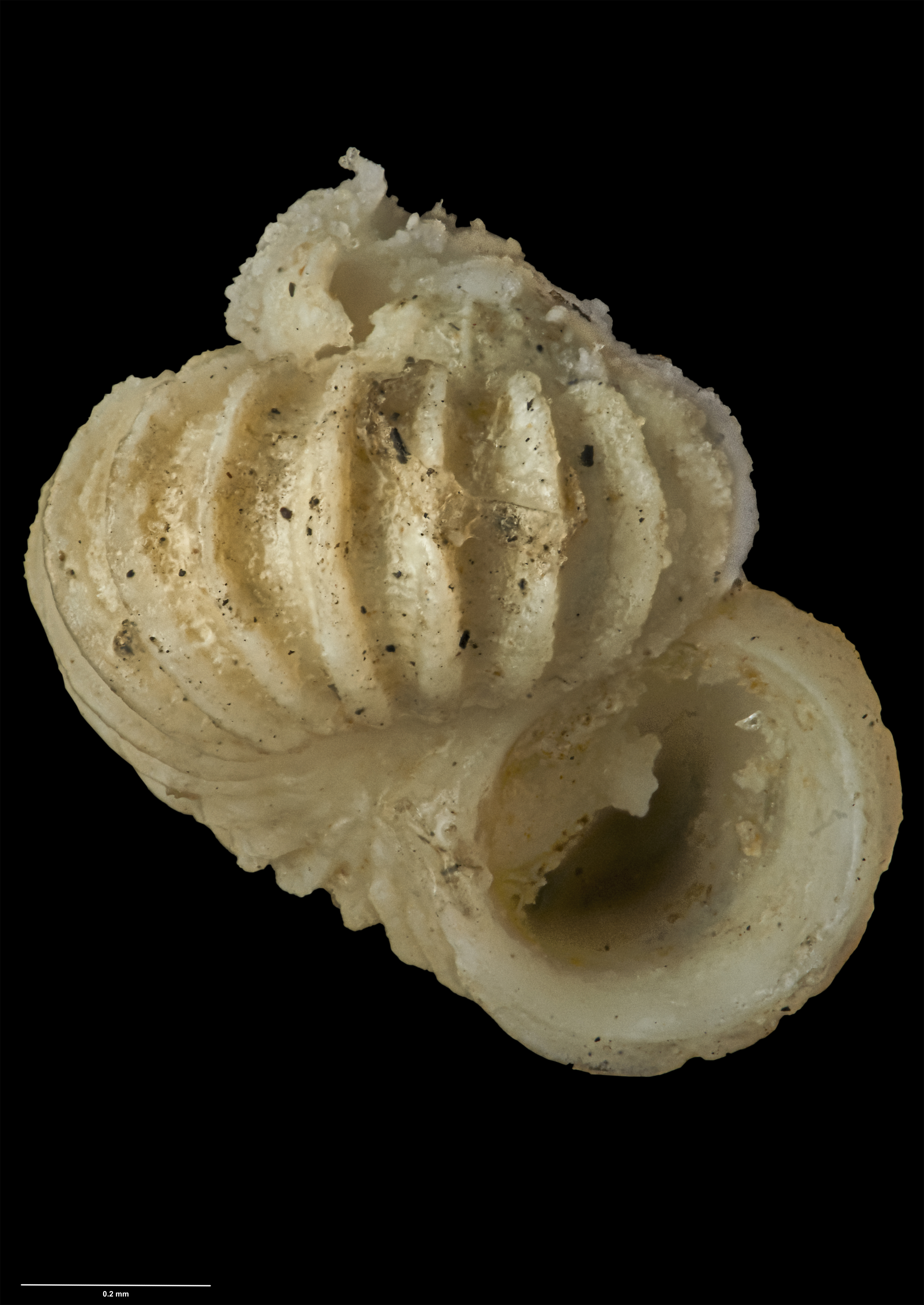

Scientific classification
- Kingdom: Animalia
- Phylum: Mollusca
- Class: Gastropoda
- Subclass: Vetigastropoda
- Family: incertae sedis
- Genus: Brookula
- Species: B. contigua

Binomial name
- Brookula contigua Powell, 1940

= Brookula contigua =

Species of gastropod

Brookula contigua is a species of minute sea snail, a marine gastropod mollusc, unassigned in the superfamily Seguenzioidea.

== Distribution ==
This species is only known to occur at the Three Kings Islands, New Zealand.
