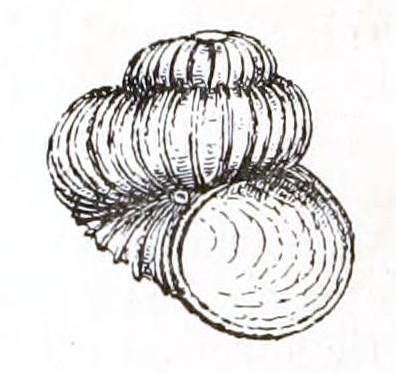

Conservation status
- Naturally Uncommon (NZ TCS)

Scientific classification
- Kingdom: Animalia
- Phylum: Mollusca
- Class: Gastropoda
- Subclass: Vetigastropoda
- Superfamily: Seguenzioidea
- Family: incertae sedis
- Genus: Brookula
- Species: B. stibarochila

Binomial name
- Brookula stibarochila Iredale, 1912

= Brookula stibarochila =

Species of gastropod

Brookula stibarochila is a species of sea snail, a marine gastropod mollusc, unassigned in the superfamily Seguenzioidea.

== Description ==
The height of the shell attains 1.4 mm.

== Distribution ==
This marine species occurs off New Zealand.
