= Aequispirella iredalei =

Scientific classification
- Kingdom: Animalia
- Phylum: Mollusca
- Class: Gastropoda
- Subclass: Vetigastropoda
- Superfamily: Seguenzioidea
- Family: incertae sedis
- Genus: Aequispirella
- Species: †A. iredalei

Binomial name
- †Aequispirella iredalei (Finlay, 1924)

Synonyms
- † Brookula iredalei Finlay, 1924; † Brookula (Aequispirella) iredalei Finlay, 1924

Extinct species of gastropod

Aequispirella iredalei is an extinct species of sea snail, a marine gastropod mollusk, unassigned in the superfamily Seguenzioidea.

== Distribution ==
Fossils of this marine species were found in New Zealand. These species was found in the Coast of Rio de Janeiro State in South America. There were specifically nine different species that were found, however, the Brookula Iredalei was distinct due to the differences in its axial ribs and spiral cords.
