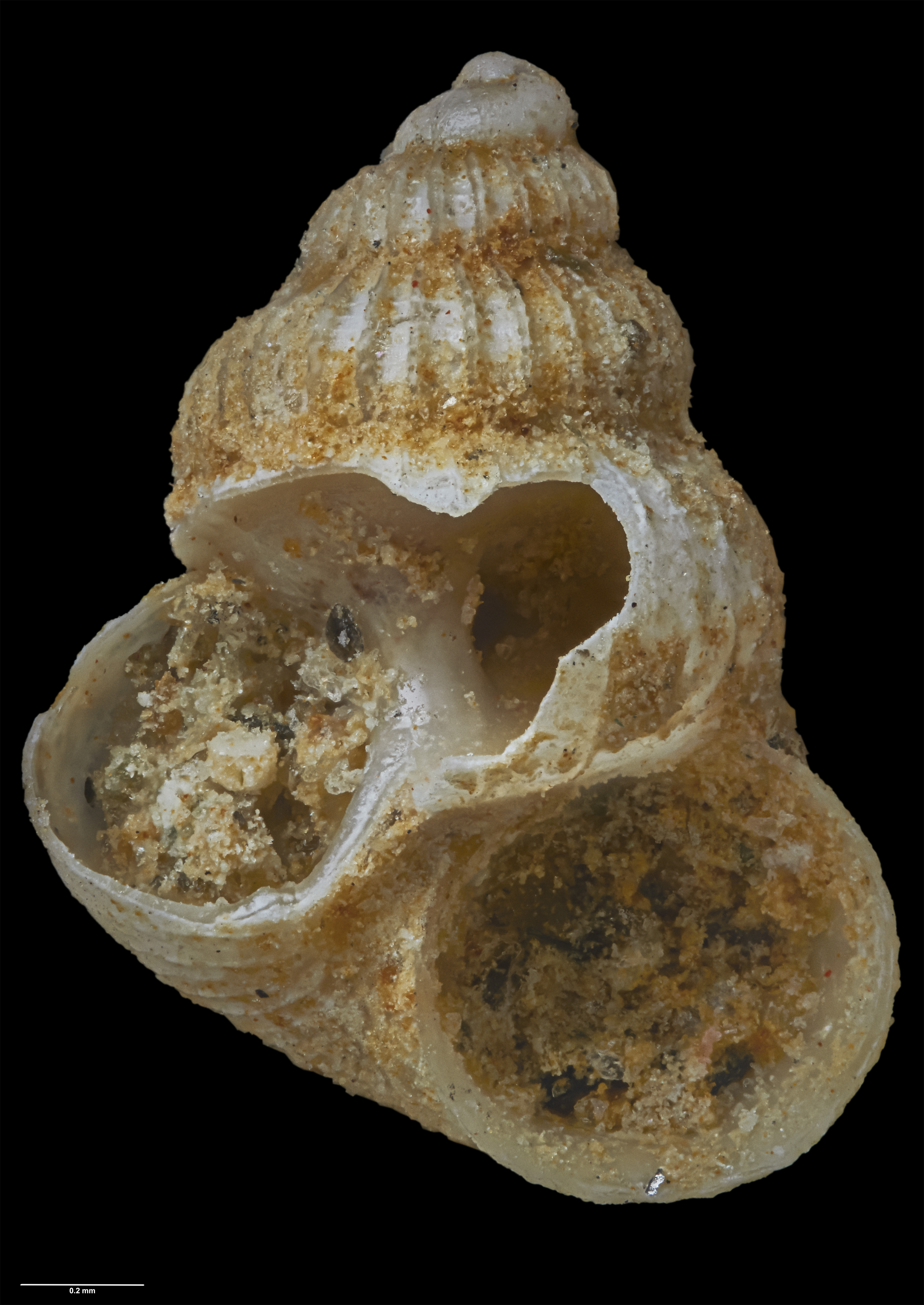
- Aequispirella tenuilirata

Scientific classification
- Kingdom: Animalia
- Phylum: Mollusca
- Class: Gastropoda
- Subclass: Vetigastropoda
- Superfamily: Seguenzioidea
- Family: incertae sedis
- Genus: Aequispirella; Finlay, 1924

Synonyms
- Brookula (Aequispirella) Finlay, 1924

= Aequispirella =

Genus of gastropods

Aequispirella is a genus of sea snails, marine gastropod mollusks, unassigned in the superfamily Seguenzioidea.

== Species ==
- †Aequispirella bifurcata (Maxwell, 1992)
- Aequispirella corula (Hutton, 1885)
- Aequispirella enderbyensis (Powell, 1931)
- Aequispirella finlayi (Powell, 1933)
- † Aequispirella iredalei (Finlay, 1924)
- † Aequispirella kaawaensis (Laws, 1940)
- † Aequispirella tenuilirata (Finlay, 1924)
