= Benthobrookula nepeanensis =

Scientific classification
- Kingdom: Animalia
- Phylum: Mollusca
- Class: Gastropoda
- Subclass: Vetigastropoda
- Superfamily: Seguenzioidea
- Family: incertae sedis
- Genus: Benthobrookula
- Species: B. nepeanensis

Binomial name
- Benthobrookula nepeanensis (Gatliff, 1906)

Synonyms
- Brookula jacksonensis Laseron, C.F., 1954; Brookula nepeanensis (Gatliff, 1906); Scala nepeanensis Gatliff, 1906

Species of gastropod

Benthobrookula nepeanensis is a species of sea snail, a marine gastropod mollusk, currently unassigned within the superfamily Seguenzioidea.

== Description ==
The shell reaches a height of 1.4 mm.

== Distribution ==
This marine species occurs off New South Wales and Tasmania, Australia.
