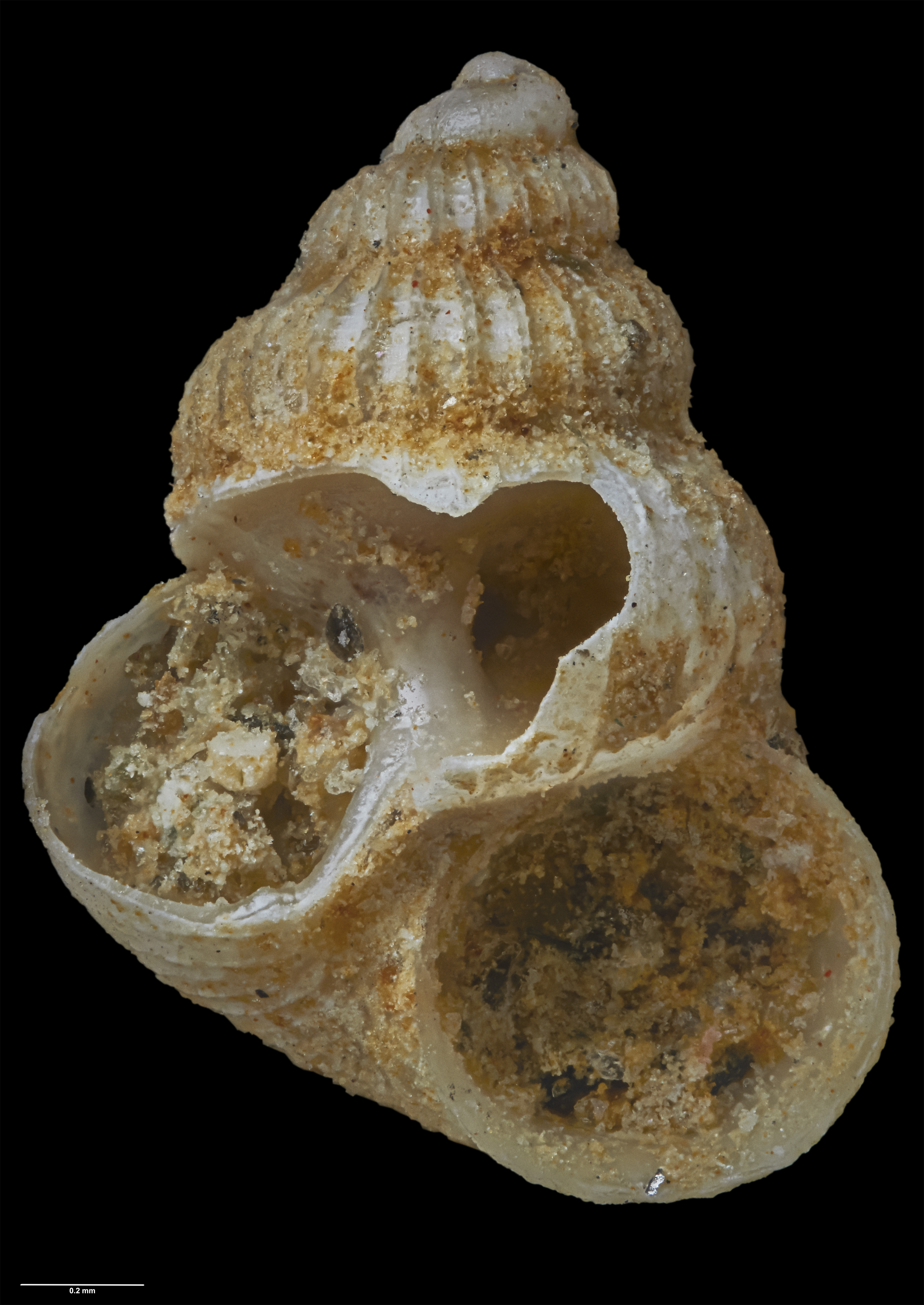
- Holotype from the Auckland War Memorial Museum

Scientific classification
- Kingdom: Animalia
- Phylum: Mollusca
- Class: Gastropoda
- Subclass: Vetigastropoda
- Superfamily: Seguenzioidea
- Family: incertae sedis
- Genus: Aequispirella
- Species: †A. tenuilirata

Binomial name
- †Aequispirella tenuilirata (Finlay, 1924)

Synonyms
- † Brookula (Aequispirella) tenuilirata Finlay, 1924

= Aequispirella tenuilirata =

Extinct species of gastropod

Aequispirella tenuilirata is an extinct species of sea snail, a marine gastropod mollusk, unassigned in the superfamily Seguenzioidea.

== Distribution ==
Fossils of this marine species were found in New Zealand.
