= Benthobrookula kerguelensis =

Scientific classification
- Kingdom: Animalia
- Phylum: Mollusca
- Class: Gastropoda
- Subclass: Vetigastropoda
- Superfamily: Seguenzioidea
- Family: incertae sedis
- Genus: Benthobrookula
- Species: B. kerguelensis

Binomial name
- Benthobrookula kerguelensis Thiele, 1925

Synonyms
- Brookula kerguelensis

Species of gastropod

Benthobrookula kerguelensis is a species of sea snail, a marine gastropod mollusk, unassigned in the superfamily Seguenzioidea.

== Description ==
The shell reaches a height of 1.6 mm.

== Distribution ==
This species occurs in the Southern Indian Ocean off the Kerguelen Islands.
