= Benthobrookula strebeli =

Scientific classification
- Kingdom: Animalia
- Phylum: Mollusca
- Class: Gastropoda
- Subclass: Vetigastropoda
- Family: incertae sedis
- Genus: Benthobrookula
- Species: B. strebeli

Binomial name
- Benthobrookula strebeli A. W. B. Powell, 1951

Synonyms
- Brookula antarctica Dell, 1990; Brookula strebeli (Powell, 1951)

Species of gastropod

Brookula strebeli is a species of sea snail, a marine gastropod mollusk unassigned in the superfamily Seguenzioidea.

== Description ==
The maximum recorded size of the shell is 1.54 mm.

== Distribution ==
This species occurs in subantarctic waters off the South Georgia Islands.
