= Benthobrookula paranaensis =

Scientific classification
- Kingdom: Animalia
- Phylum: Mollusca
- Class: Gastropoda
- Subclass: Vetigastropoda
- Superfamily: Seguenzioidea
- Family: incertae sedis
- Genus: Benthobrookula
- Species: B. paranaensis

Binomial name
- Benthobrookula paranaensis Zelaya, Absalão & Pimenta, 2006

Synonyms
- Brookula paranaensis (Zelaya, Absalão & Pimenta, 2006)

Species of sea snail

Benthobrookula paranaensis is a species of sea snail, a marine gastropod mollusk, unassigned in the superfamily Seguenzioidea.

== Distribution ==
This species occurs in the Atlantic Ocean off Brazil.
