= Imbricoscelis coronis =

Scientific classification
- Kingdom: Animalia
- Phylum: Mollusca
- Class: Gastropoda
- Subclass: Vetigastropoda
- Superfamily: Seguenzioidea
- Family: Chilodontaidae
- Genus: Imbricoscelis
- Species: I. coronis

Binomial name
- Imbricoscelis coronis (Barnard, 1963)

Synonyms
- Brookula coronis Barnard, 1963

Species of gastropod

Imbricoscelis coronis is a species of sea snail, a marine gastropod mollusk, unassigned in the superfamily Seguenzioidea.
