= Benthobrookula charleenae =

Scientific classification
- Kingdom: Animalia
- Phylum: Mollusca
- Class: Gastropoda
- Subclass: Vetigastropoda
- Family: incertae sedis
- Genus: Benthobrookula
- Species: B. charleenae

Binomial name
- Benthobrookula charleenae Schwabe & Engl, 2008

Synonyms
- Brookula charleenae Schwabe & Engl, 2008

Species of gastropod

Benthobrookula charleenae is a species of sea snail, a marine gastropod mollusk unassigned in the superfamily Seguenzioidea.

== Description ==
The size of the shell varies between 0.8 mm and 1.4 mm.

== Distribution ==
This marine species occurs off the South Sandwich Islands, found at a depth of 2700 m.
