= Benthobrookula argentina =

Scientific classification
- Kingdom: Animalia
- Phylum: Mollusca
- Class: Gastropoda
- Subclass: Vetigastropoda
- Superfamily: Seguenzioidea
- Family: incertae sedis
- Genus: Benthobrookula
- Species: B. argentina

Binomial name
- Benthobrookula argentina (Zelaya, Absalão & Pimenta, 2006)

Synonyms
- Brookula argentina Zelaya, Absalão & Pimenta, 2006

Species of gastropod

Benthobrookula argentina is a species of sea snail, a marine gastropod mollusk, unassigned in the superfamily Seguenzioidea.

== Description ==
The length of the shell attains 1.2 mm.

== Distribution ==
This marine species occurs off South Georgia and Antarctica.
