= Aequispirella bifurcata =

Scientific classification
- Kingdom: Animalia
- Phylum: Mollusca
- Class: Gastropoda
- Subclass: Vetigastropoda
- Superfamily: Seguenzioidea
- Family: incertae sedis
- Genus: Aequispirella
- Species: †A. bifurcata

Binomial name
- †Aequispirella bifurcata (Maxwell, 1992)

Synonyms
- † Brookula bifurcata Maxwell, 1992; † Brookula (Aequispirella) bifurcata Maxwell, 1992

Extinct species of gastropod

Aequispirella bifurcata is an extinct species of sea snail, a marine gastropod mollusk, unassigned in the superfamily Seguenzioidea.

== Distribution ==
Fossils of this marine species were found in New Zealand.
