= Benthobrookula powelli =

Scientific classification
- Kingdom: Animalia
- Phylum: Mollusca
- Class: Gastropoda
- Subclass: Vetigastropoda
- Family: incertae sedis
- Genus: Benthobrookula
- Species: B. powelli

Binomial name
- Benthobrookula powelli Clarke, 1961

Synonyms
- Brookula powelli (Clarke, 1961); Brookula (Benthobrookula) powelli Clarke, 1961

Species of gastropod

Benthobrookula powelli is a species of sea snail, a marine gastropod mollusk unassigned in the superfamily Seguenzioidea.

== Description ==
The maximum recorded size of the shell is 2.3 mm.

== Distribution ==
This species occurs in the South Atlantic Ocean off Uruguay, Argentina and the South Georgia Islands, found at depths between 1,000 m and 5,130 m.
