= Benthobrookula exquisita =

Scientific classification
- Kingdom: Animalia
- Phylum: Mollusca
- Class: Gastropoda
- Subclass: Vetigastropoda
- Superfamily: Seguenzioidea
- Family: incertae sedis
- Genus: Benthobrookula
- Species: B. exquisita

Binomial name
- Benthobrookula exquisita Clarke, 1961

Synonyms
- Brookula exquisita Clarke, 1961

Species of sea snail

Benthobrookula exquisita is a species of sea snail, a marine gastropod mollusk, unassigned in the superfamily Seguenzioidea.

== Description ==
The height of the shell attains 1.8 mm.

== Distribution ==
This marine species occurs off South Georgia.
