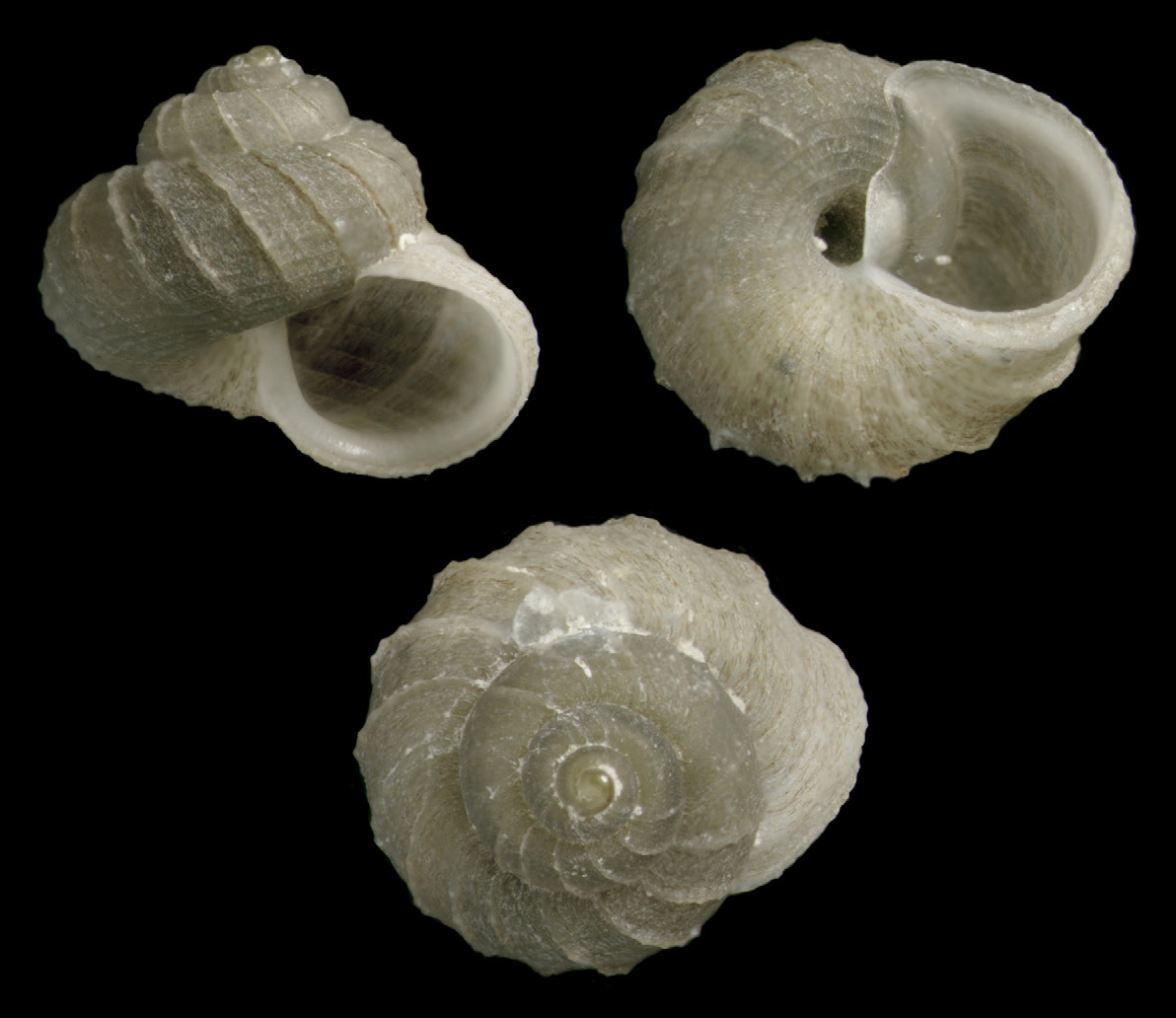

Scientific classification
- Kingdom: Animalia
- Phylum: Mollusca
- Class: Gastropoda
- Subclass: Vetigastropoda
- Superfamily: Seguenzioidea
- Family: incertae sedis
- Genus: Vetulonia
- Species: V. paucivaricosa

Binomial name
- Vetulonia paucivaricosa (Dautzenberg, 1889)

Synonyms
- Brookula josephinae (Dall, 1927); Machaeroplax cancellata (Jeffreys, 1883); Margarites cancellata (Jeffreys, 1883); Solariella cancellata var. paucivaricosa Dautzenberg 1889; Solariella cancellata var. paucivaricosa Dautzenberg, 1889; Trochus cancellatus Jeffreys 1883; Vetulonia cancellata (Jeffreys, 1883); Vetulonia jeffreysi Dall, 1913; Vetulonia josephinae Dall 1927

= Vetulonia paucivaricosa =

Species of gastropod

Vetulonia paucivaricosa is a species of sea snail, a marine gastropod mollusk in the superfamily Seguenzioidea.

== Description ==
The shell grows to a height of 3.8 mm.

(Described as Trochus cancellatus) The rather thin shell forms a depressed cone, opaque, and lustreless. The sculpture consists of oblique laminar ribs in the line of growth, which are crossed by as many but slighter spiral striae. There are about 20 ribs and striae on the body whorl. This sculpture covers the base, but the striae are wanting on the apex. The colour of the shell is pale yellowish-brown. The spire is rather depressed. The shell contains 5-6 convex whorls. The body whorl occupies three fifths of the shell. The apex is regular and compressed. The aperture is more round than oval, angulated above and below on the inner side. The outer lip is somewhat expanded and thickened. The inner lip is nearly straight, attached to the columella below the periphery. The umbilicus is rather narrow, with a deep perforation which exposes the inner whorls.

== Distribution ==
This species occurs in the Atlantic Ocean in the bathyal zone of the Azores and off Portugal, found at depths between 250 m and 805 m.
