= Benthobrookula calypso =

Scientific classification
- Kingdom: Animalia
- Phylum: Mollusca
- Class: Gastropoda
- Subclass: Vetigastropoda
- Superfamily: Seguenzioidea
- Family: incertae sedis
- Genus: Benthobrookula
- Species: B. calypso

Binomial name
- Benthobrookula calypso (Melvill & Standen, 1912)

Synonyms
- Brookula calypso (Melvill & Standen, 1912); Cyclostrema calypso Melvill & Standen, 1912

Species of gastropod

Benthobrookula calypso is a species of sea snail, a marine gastropod mollusk, unassigned in the superfamily Seguenzioidea.

== Description ==
The height of the shell attains 1.3 mm.

(Original description in Latin) The shell is very minute, narrowly but deeply umbilicate, conical, white, and delicate.

It has up to five whorls in total, including the two smooth apical whorls. The remaining whorls are closely longitudinally lirate and spirally cross-wise striate. The number of longitudinal lirae on the body whorl is up to forty. All the whorls are ventricose and deeply impressed at the sutures.

The aperture is round, with a continuous peristome (margin).

== Distribution ==
This marine species occurs off Argentina, the Falkland Islands and the Kerguelen Islands.
