= Benthobrookula gemmula =

Scientific classification
- Kingdom: Animalia
- Phylum: Mollusca
- Class: Gastropoda
- Subclass: Vetigastropoda
- Superfamily: Seguenzioidea
- Family: incertae sedis
- Genus: Benthobrookula
- Species: B. gemmula

Binomial name
- Benthobrookula gemmula (Turton, 1932)

Synonyms
- Brookula gemmula (Turton, 1932); Scala gemmula (Turton, 1932); Scalaria gemmula Turton, 1932

Species of gastropod

Benthobrookula gemmula is a species of sea snail, a marine gastropod mollusk, unassigned in the superfamily Seguenzioidea.

== Distribution ==
This poorly known marine species occurs off South Africa.
