= Benthobrookula conica =

Scientific classification
- Kingdom: Animalia
- Phylum: Mollusca
- Class: Gastropoda
- Subclass: Vetigastropoda
- Superfamily: Seguenzioidea
- Family: incertae sedis
- Genus: Benthobrookula
- Species: B. conica

Binomial name
- Benthobrookula conica (Watson, 1886)

Synonyms
- Brookula conica (Watson, 1886)

Species of gastropod

Benthobrookula conica is a species of sea snail, a marine gastropod mollusk, unassigned in the superfamily Seguenzioidea.

== Description ==
The height of the shell attains 1.8 mm.

== Distribution ==
This species occurs in the Atlantic Ocean off Brazil.
