= Vetulonia galapagana =

Scientific classification
- Domain: Eukaryota
- Kingdom: Animalia
- Phylum: Mollusca
- Class: Gastropoda
- Subclass: Vetigastropoda
- Superfamily: Seguenzioidea
- Family: incertae sedis
- Genus: Vetulonia
- Species: V. galapagana

Binomial name
- Vetulonia galapagana Dall, 1913

Synonyms
- Brookula galapagana (Dall, 1913) ·

Species of gastropod

Vetulonia galapagana is a species of sea snail, a marine gastropod mollusk, unassigned in the superfamily Seguenzioidea.

== Description ==
The length of the shell attains 2.2 mm; its maximum diameter 3.4 mm.

(Original description) The small, white shell consists of four moderately convex whorls (the protoconch defective). The suture is distinct. The spiral sculpture between the sutures consists of seven or eight close-set flattish threads, crossed by (on the body whorl) seventeen narrow, slightly elevated, laminate ribs which become obsolete toward the umbilicus on the base. The last rib forming the outer lip is markedly larger and thicker than its predecessors. The umbilicus is funicular, shallow and with no marginating rib, it does not penetrate the axis. The aperture is rounded and is interrupted by the body whorl. The outer lip reflected, thickened, but with a sharp edge. The operculum is unknown.

== Distribution ==
This species occurs in Galapagos.
