= Benthobrookula pfefferi =

Scientific classification
- Kingdom: Animalia
- Phylum: Mollusca
- Class: Gastropoda
- Subclass: Vetigastropoda
- Family: incertae sedis
- Genus: Benthobrookula
- Species: B. pfefferi

Binomial name
- Benthobrookula pfefferi Powell, 1951

Synonyms
- Brookula delli Numanami, 1996; Brookula pfefferi (Powell, 1951); Brookula rossiana Dell, 1990; Brookula sinusbreidensis Numanami & Okutani, 1991

Species of gastropod

Benthobrookula pfefferi is a species of sea snail, a marine gastropod mollusk unassigned in the superfamily Seguenzioidea.

== Description ==
The shell grows to a height of 2.5 mm.

== Distribution ==
This marine species occurs off the South Georgia Islands.
