= Aequispirella enderbyensis =

Scientific classification
- Kingdom: Animalia
- Phylum: Mollusca
- Class: Gastropoda
- Subclass: Vetigastropoda
- Superfamily: Seguenzioidea
- Family: incertae sedis
- Genus: Aequispirella
- Species: A. enderbyensis

Binomial name
- Aequispirella enderbyensis (Powell, 1931)

Synonyms
- Brookula enderbyensis Powell, 1931

Species of gastropod

Aequispirella enderbyensis is a species of sea snail, a marine gastropod mollusk, unassigned in the superfamily Seguenzioidea.

== Distribution ==
This marine species is endemic to New Zealand.
