= Aequispirella corula =

Scientific classification
- Kingdom: Animalia
- Phylum: Mollusca
- Class: Gastropoda
- Subclass: Vetigastropoda
- Superfamily: Seguenzioidea
- Family: incertae sedis
- Genus: Aequispirella
- Species: A. corula

Binomial name
- Aequispirella corula (Hutton, 1885)

Synonyms
- Brookula (Aequispirella) corula (Hutton, 1885); Scalaria corulum Hutton, 1885

Species of gastropod

Aequispirella corula is a species of sea snail, a marine gastropod mollusk, unassigned in the superfamily Seguenzioidea.

== Distribution ==
This marine species occurs off New Zealand.
