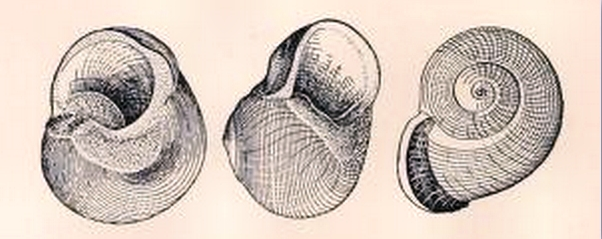
- Original drawing with three views of a shell of Callomphala globosa

Scientific classification
- Kingdom: Animalia
- Phylum: Mollusca
- Class: Gastropoda
- Subclass: Vetigastropoda
- Order: Trochida
- Family: Skeneidae
- Genus: Callomphala
- Species: C. globosa

Binomial name
- Callomphala globosa Hedley, 1901

Synonyms
- Teinostoma (Callomphala) globosa Hedley, 1901

= Callomphala globosa =

Species of gastropod

Callomphala globosa is a species of small sea snail, a marine gastropod mollusk in the family Skeneidae.

== Description ==
(Original description by Charles Hedley) The height of this shell is 2 mm, its diameter 2.4 mm. This species differs from Callomphala lucida by being smaller, higher in proportion and closely engraved by numerous fine, spiral striae.

== Distribution ==
This marine species occurs off Queensland, Australia.
