= Lopheliella moolenbeeki =

Scientific classification
- Kingdom: Animalia
- Phylum: Mollusca
- Class: Gastropoda
- Subclass: Vetigastropoda
- Order: Trochida
- Superfamily: Trochoidea
- Family: Skeneidae
- Genus: Lopheliella
- Species: L. moolenbeeki

Binomial name
- Lopheliella moolenbeeki Hoffman, van Heugten & Lavaleye, 2008

Species of gastropod

Lopheliella moolenbeeki is a species of sea snail, a marine gastropod mollusk in the family Skeneidae. It was named for Robert G. Moolenbeek, a Dutch malacologist.

== Description ==
L. moolenbeeki has a height of 1.9 mm and a width of 1.8 mm. Its shell has a smooth appearance and its honeycomb patterned protoconch is nearly identical to that of L. rockallensis.

== Distribution ==
L. moolenbeeki can be found at depths of around 557 to 767 meters. It is only known to exist on the southeastern flank of the Rockall Bank in the North Atlantic, off the coast of Ireland (N55°44, W15°78).
