= Dillwynella ingens =

Scientific classification
- Kingdom: Animalia
- Phylum: Mollusca
- Class: Gastropoda
- Subclass: Vetigastropoda
- Order: Trochida
- Family: Skeneidae
- Genus: Dillwynella
- Species: D. ingens

Binomial name
- Dillwynella ingens B.A. Marshall, 1988

Species of gastropod

Dillwynella ingens is a species of sea snail, a marine gastropod mollusk in the family Skeneidae.

== Description ==
The height of the shell attains 4.8 mm, its diameter 5.65 mm.

== Distribution ==
This marine species is endemic to New Zealand, found off the Chatham Islands at a depth of 1140 m.
