= Mikro hattonensis =

Scientific classification
- Kingdom: Animalia
- Phylum: Mollusca
- Class: Gastropoda
- Subclass: Vetigastropoda
- Order: Trochida
- Family: Skeneidae
- Genus: Mikro
- Species: M. hattonensis

Binomial name
- Mikro hattonensis Hoffman, Van Heugten & Lavaleye, 2010

Species of gastropod

Mikro hattonensis is a species of sea snail, a marine gastropod mollusc in the family Skeneidae.

== Distribution ==
This species occurs in the Atlantic Ocean off the Hatton Bank, Iceland.
