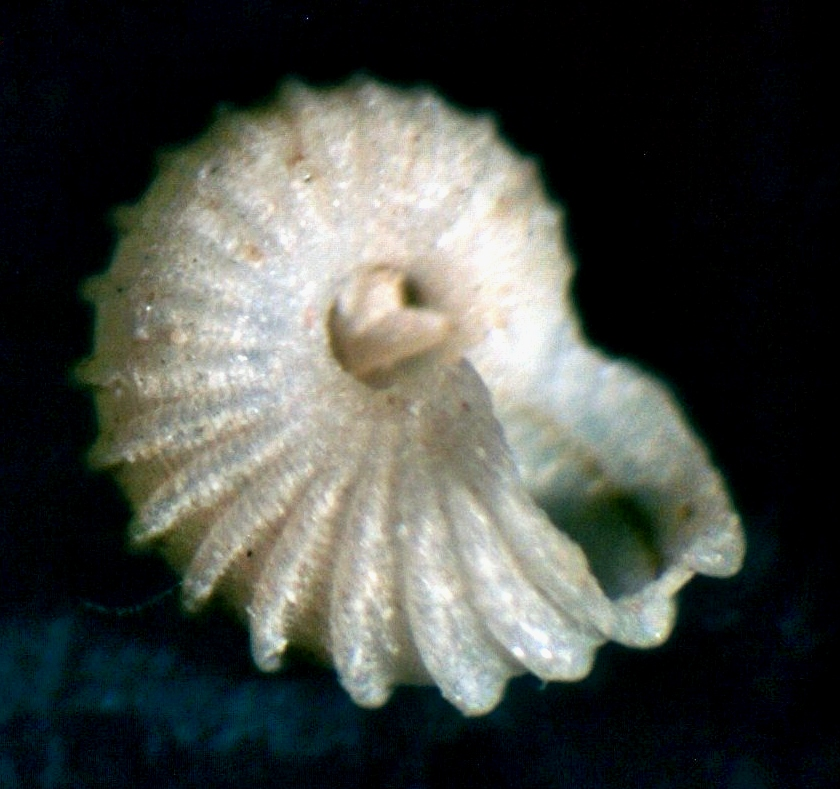
- Apertural view of a shell of Munditiella ammonoceras

Scientific classification
- Kingdom: Animalia
- Phylum: Mollusca
- Class: Gastropoda
- Subclass: Vetigastropoda
- Order: Trochida
- Family: Skeneidae
- Genus: Munditiella
- Species: M. ammonoceras

Binomial name
- Munditiella ammonoceras (A. Adams, 1863)

Synonyms
- Cyclostrema ammonoceras A. Adams, 1863

= Munditiella ammonoceras =

Species of gastropod

Munditiella ammonoceras is a tiny species of sea snail, a marine gastropod mollusk in the family Skeneidae,.

== Description ==
The size of the shell varies between 2 mm and 2.5 mm.

== Distribution ==
This species occurs in the Pacific Ocean off Korea, Japan, Taiwan and the Philippines.
