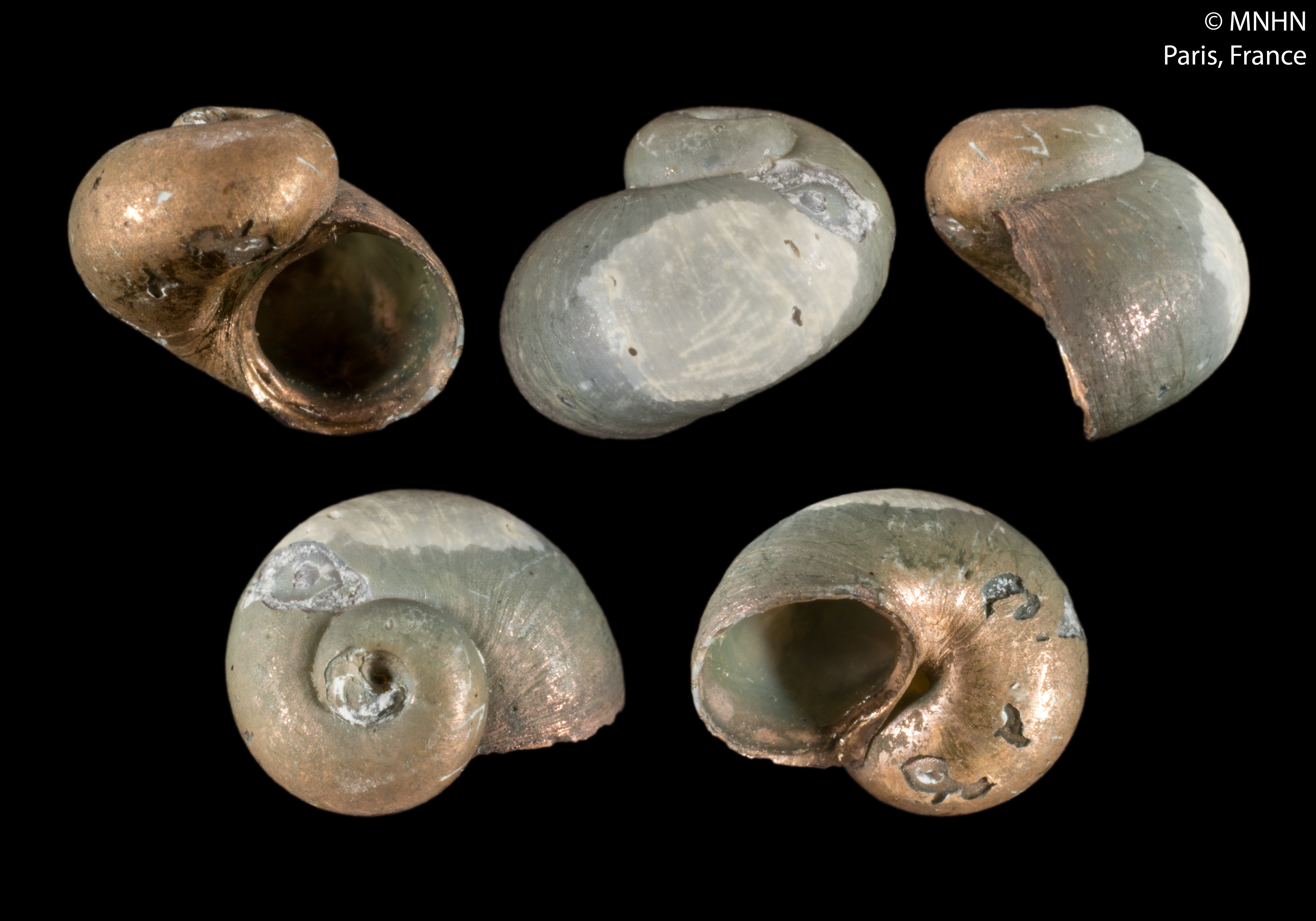
- Shell of Fucaria mystax (holotype at MNHN, Paris)

Conservation status
- Critically Endangered (IUCN 3.1)

Scientific classification
- Kingdom: Animalia
- Phylum: Mollusca
- Class: Gastropoda
- Subclass: Vetigastropoda
- Order: Trochida
- Superfamily: Trochoidea
- Family: Skeneidae
- Genus: Fucaria
- Species: F. mystax

Binomial name
- Fucaria mystax Warén & Bouchet, 2001

= Fucaria mystax =

Species of gastropod

Fucaria mystax is a species of sea snail, a marine gastropod mollusk in the family Skeneidae.

== Description ==
The length of the shell attains 5.8 mm.

== Distribution ==
This marine species occurs off hydrothermal vents of the Edison seamount (off Papua New Guinea) at a depth of 1483 m.
