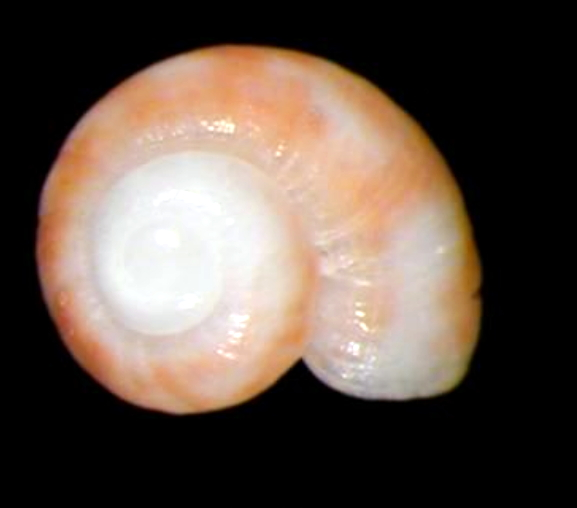
- Shell of Parisanda iredalei (specimen at the Australian myseum)

Scientific classification
- Kingdom: Animalia
- Phylum: Mollusca
- Class: Gastropoda
- Subclass: Vetigastropoda
- Order: Trochida
- Family: Skeneidae
- Genus: Parisanda
- Species: P. iredalei

Binomial name
- Parisanda iredalei Laseron, 1954

= Parisanda iredalei =

Species of gastropod

Parisanda iredalei is a species of small sea snail, a marine gastropod mollusk in the family Skeneidae.

== Distribution ==
This species is endemic to Australia and occurs off New South Wales.
