= Dillwynella voightae =

Scientific classification
- Kingdom: Animalia
- Phylum: Mollusca
- Class: Gastropoda
- Subclass: Vetigastropoda
- Order: Trochida
- Family: Skeneidae
- Genus: Dillwynella
- Species: D. voightae

Binomial name
- Dillwynella voightae Kunze, 2011

Species of gastropod

Dillwynella voightae is a species of sea snail, a marine gastropod mollusk in the family Skeneidae.

== Distribution ==
This marine species occurs on the bottom of the sea on wood falls and sunken algal holdfasts in the Caribbean Sea and in the Pacific Ocean.
