= Partubiola blancha =

Scientific classification
- Kingdom: Animalia
- Phylum: Mollusca
- Class: Gastropoda
- Subclass: Vetigastropoda
- Order: Trochida
- Family: Skeneidae
- Genus: Partubiola
- Species: P. blancha

Binomial name
- Partubiola blancha Iredale, 1936

Species of gastropod

Partubiola blancha is a species of small sea snail, a marine gastropod mollusk in the family Skeneidae,.

== Distribution ==
This species is endemic to Australia, occurring off New South Wales.
