= Dillwynella vitrea =

Scientific classification
- Kingdom: Animalia
- Phylum: Mollusca
- Class: Gastropoda
- Subclass: Vetigastropoda
- Order: Trochida
- Family: Skeneidae
- Genus: Dillwynella
- Species: D. vitrea

Binomial name
- Dillwynella vitrea Hasegawa, 1997

Species of gastropod

Dillwynella vitrea is a species of sea snail, a marine gastropod mollusk in the family Skeneidae. The height of the shell attains 3 mm. This marine species occurs off Japan.
