= Zalipais benthicola =

Scientific classification
- Kingdom: Animalia
- Phylum: Mollusca
- Class: Gastropoda
- Subclass: Vetigastropoda
- Order: Trochida
- Family: Skeneidae
- Genus: Zalipais
- Species: Z. benthicola

Binomial name
- Zalipais benthicola Powell, 1927

Species of gastropod

Zalipais benthicola is a species of small sea snail, a marine gastropod mollusc in the family Skeneidae endemic to New Zealand.

== Description ==
The height of the shell attains 0.5 mm, its diameter 0.9 mm.

== Distribution ==
This marine species is found in Southern-eastern part of South Island, Auckland, Antipodes Islands, Bounty Islands and Chatham Islands and are endemic to New Zealand.
