= Mikro globulus =

Scientific classification
- Kingdom: Animalia
- Phylum: Mollusca
- Class: Gastropoda
- Subclass: Vetigastropoda
- Order: Trochida
- Family: Skeneidae
- Genus: Mikro
- Species: M. globulus

Binomial name
- Mikro globulus Warén, 1996

Species of gastropod

Mikro globulus is a species of sea snail, a marine gastropod mollusk in the family Skeneidae.

== Description ==
The shell grows to a length of 1 mm.

== Distribution ==
This marine species occurs off Hatton Bank, Northeast Atlantic Ocean and off southern Iceland.
