= Cirsonella variecostata =

Scientific classification
- Kingdom: Animalia
- Phylum: Mollusca
- Class: Gastropoda
- Subclass: Vetigastropoda
- Order: Trochida
- Family: Skeneidae
- Genus: Cirsonella
- Species: C. variecostata

Binomial name
- Cirsonella variecostata Powell, 1940

Species of gastropod

Cirsonella laxa is a minute sea snail, a marine gastropod mollusc in the family Skeneidae.

== Description ==
The height of the shell attains 0.6 mm, its diameter is 0.9 mm.

== Distribution ==
This species is endemic to New Zealand and occurs off Three Kings Islands at a depth of 250 m.
