= Pseudorbis granulum =

Scientific classification
- Kingdom: Animalia
- Phylum: Mollusca
- Class: Gastropoda
- Subclass: Vetigastropoda
- Order: Trochida
- Family: Skeneidae
- Genus: Pseudorbis
- Species: P. granulum

Binomial name
- Pseudorbis granulum (Brugnone, 1873)

Synonyms
- Archytaea (Pseudorbis) granulum Monterosato, 1884 (family Adeorbidae); Fossarus granulum Brugnone, 1873 (basionym); Vitrinella (Pseudorbis) granulum (Brugnone, 1873) by Thiele, 1929 (family Vitrinellidae)

Species of gastropod

Pseudorbis granulum is a species of sea snail, a marine gastropod mollusk in the family Skeneidae.

== Description ==
The size of the shell varies between 0.8 mm and 1.5 mm. The shell is scarcely unibilicated. The aperture is circular. The surface is spirally costate, not cancellated.

== Distribution ==
This marine species is found in the Mediterranean Sea, originally off Sicily and recently off the Alboran Island.
