= Cirsonella globosa =

Scientific classification
- Kingdom: Animalia
- Phylum: Mollusca
- Class: Gastropoda
- Subclass: Vetigastropoda
- Order: Trochida
- Family: Skeneidae
- Genus: Cirsonella
- Species: C. globosa

Binomial name
- Cirsonella globosa (Pelseneer, 1903)

Synonyms
- Tharsiella globosa (Pelseneer, 1903)

Species of gastropod

Cirsonella globosa is a species of sea snail, a marine gastropod mollusk in the family Skeneidae, the turban snails.
