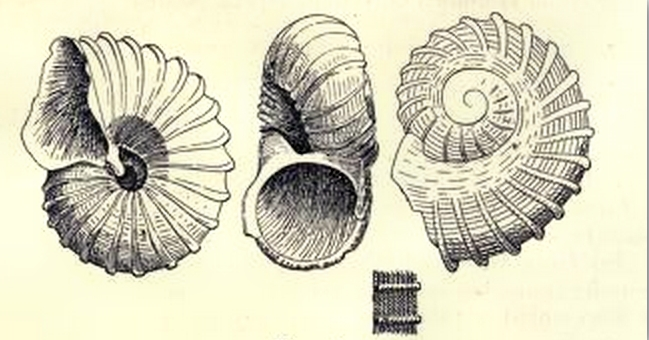
- Original drawing with three views of a shell of Munditiella qualum

Scientific classification
- Kingdom: Animalia
- Phylum: Mollusca
- Class: Gastropoda
- Subclass: Vetigastropoda
- Order: Trochida
- Family: Skeneidae
- Genus: Munditiella
- Species: M. qualum

Binomial name
- Munditiella qualum (Hedley, 1899)

Synonyms
- Teinostoma qualum Hedley, 1899; Teinostoma qualum var. paucicostatum Hedley, 1899

= Munditiella qualum =

Species of gastropod

Munditiella qualum is a species of small sea snail, a marine gastropod mollusk in the family Skeneidae.

== Description ==
The height of the shell is 0.75 mm, its diameter 1.8 mm. The white shell has a scarcely elevated spire. It is widely umbilicated. The three whorls are flattened below the suture. They are rounded at the periphery and co, cave at the base. The body whorl is ornamented with twenty, broad, squarely projecting, transverse ribs. These arise at a distance from the suture, enlarge to the periphery and continue to the basal angle. These ribs vanish on the penultimate whorl. Close, regular and fine, raised spiral lines cover the whole shell, crossing the ribs and interstices alike. These are in their turn overridden by transverse microscopic threads. The base of the shell is excavate in the centre. The umbilicus measures one-fifth of the shell's diameter, exhibiting the previous whorls. The aperture is round. The outer lip is thickened, above spreading on the previous whorl and at the base projecting a callus tongue into the umbilicus.

== Distribution ==
This species occurs in the Pacific Ocean off Indo-Malaysia, the Western Pacific and off Tuvalu; off Queensland, Australia.
