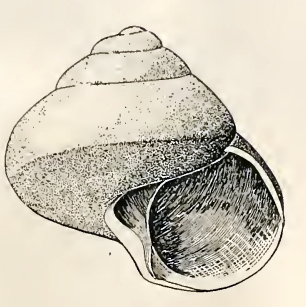
- Original drawing of a shell of Cirsonella carinata

Scientific classification
- Kingdom: Animalia
- Phylum: Mollusca
- Class: Gastropoda
- Subclass: Vetigastropoda
- Order: Trochida
- Family: Skeneidae
- Genus: Cirsonella
- Species: C. carinata

Binomial name
- Cirsonella carinata (Hedley, 1903)

Synonyms
- Crossea carinata Hedley, C. 1903; Crosseola carinata Iredale, T. & McMichael, D.F. 1962

= Cirsonella carinata =

Species of gastropod

Cirsonella carinata, common name the ridged false-top-shell, is a species of small sea snail, a marine gastropod mollusk in the family Skeneidae.

== Description ==
The height of the shell attains 1.7 mm, its diameter 1.8 mm. The minute, smooth and glossy, cream-colored shell has a turbinate shape. The four whorls have an impressed suture. The body whorl is bluntly keeled at the periphery. There is a sculpture of dense spiral microscopic striae. The base of the shell is rounded. The umbilicus is narrow and deep, and it is surrounded by a callus funicle which expands anteriorly to join the simple lip in an angular lobe. The aperture is subcircular.

== Distribution ==
This marine species occurs off New South Wales, South Australia, Tasmania, Victoria, Australia, at depths between 73 m and 200 m.
