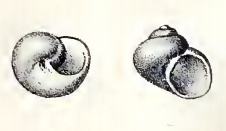
- Drawing with two views of a shell of Cirsonella weldii

Scientific classification
- Kingdom: Animalia
- Phylum: Mollusca
- Class: Gastropoda
- Subclass: Vetigastropoda
- Order: Trochida
- Family: Skeneidae
- Genus: Cirsonella
- Species: C. weldii

Binomial name
- Cirsonella weldii (Tenison-Woods, 1877)

Synonyms
- Cirsonella australis Angas, 1877; Cirsonella naticoides (Hedley, 1907); Crossea naticoides Hedley, C., 1907; Crosseola naticoides Iredale, T. & McMichael, D.F. 1962; Cyclostrema susonis Tenison-Woods, 1877; Cyclostrema weldii Tenison-Woods, 1877; Teinostoma (Cirsonella) australe Angas, 1877

= Cirsonella weldii =

Species of gastropod

Cirsonella weldii, with the common name of the shiny liotia, is a species of sea snail, a marine gastropod mollusk in the of family Skeneidae.

== Description ==
The diameter of the shell attains 2 mm. The shining, white shell has a globosely turbinate shape. It is narrowly umbilicated, semi-opaque, and smooth. The four whorls are convex. The body whorl is large and rounded at the periphery. The aperture is circular. It's peristome is continuous and slightly thickened on the columellar margin.

(Original description by Charles Hedley as Cirsonella naticoides) The height of the shell attains 2.35 mm, its diameter 3 mm. This is a small, solid, cream-colored shell with a turbinate shape. The four rounded whorls contain no sculpture. The surface is smooth and polished, in contrast with most species in this genus which are cancellate. The umbilicus is deep and narrow, its margin a faint basal funicle. The aperture is entire circular, double-edged, on its right lower margin the low arched butt-end of the basal funicle, then a broad thick callus tongue. This is probably marking the termination of a second inner funicle, and reaching half-way across the umbilicus. Lastly there is a similar but smaller callus pad laid upon the preceding whorl. The double basal funicle is remarkable. The inner funicle is swallowed by the umbilicus and its presence is only indicated by the callus on the aperture. The outer funicle is unusually faint.

== Distribution ==
This marine species occurs off the coasts of New South Wales, Queensland, South Australia, Tasmania, and Victoria, Australia.
