= Cirsonella densilirata =

Scientific classification
- Kingdom: Animalia
- Phylum: Mollusca
- Class: Gastropoda
- Subclass: Vetigastropoda
- Order: Trochida
- Family: Skeneidae
- Genus: Cirsonella
- Species: C. densilirata

Binomial name
- Cirsonella densilirata Suter, 1908

Species of gastropod

Cirsonella densilirata is a minute sea snail, a marine gastropod mollusc in the family Skeneidae.

== Description ==
(Original description by Henry Suter) The height of the shell attains 1.8 mm, its diameter 2.3 mm. The small, white shell has a turbinate shape. It is subdiaphanous, slightly shining, and perforated. Its sculpture consists of numerous fine microscopic spiral lirae. The spire is depressed conoidal. Its outlines are convex, lower than the aperture. The yellowish-white protoconch consists of 2 convex smooth whorls. The 3½ convex whorls are rapidly increasing. The periphery of the body whorl is rounded. The base of the shell is convex, with an impressed umbilical area. The suture is not much impressed. The circular aperture is oblique. Inside it is microscopically lirate. The peristome is continuous and thick. The arcuate columella is slightly expanded toward the narrow perforation, sometimes partly concealing it. The horny operculum is multispiral with a central nucleus.

== Distribution ==
This marine species is endemic to New Zealand and was found off South Island.
