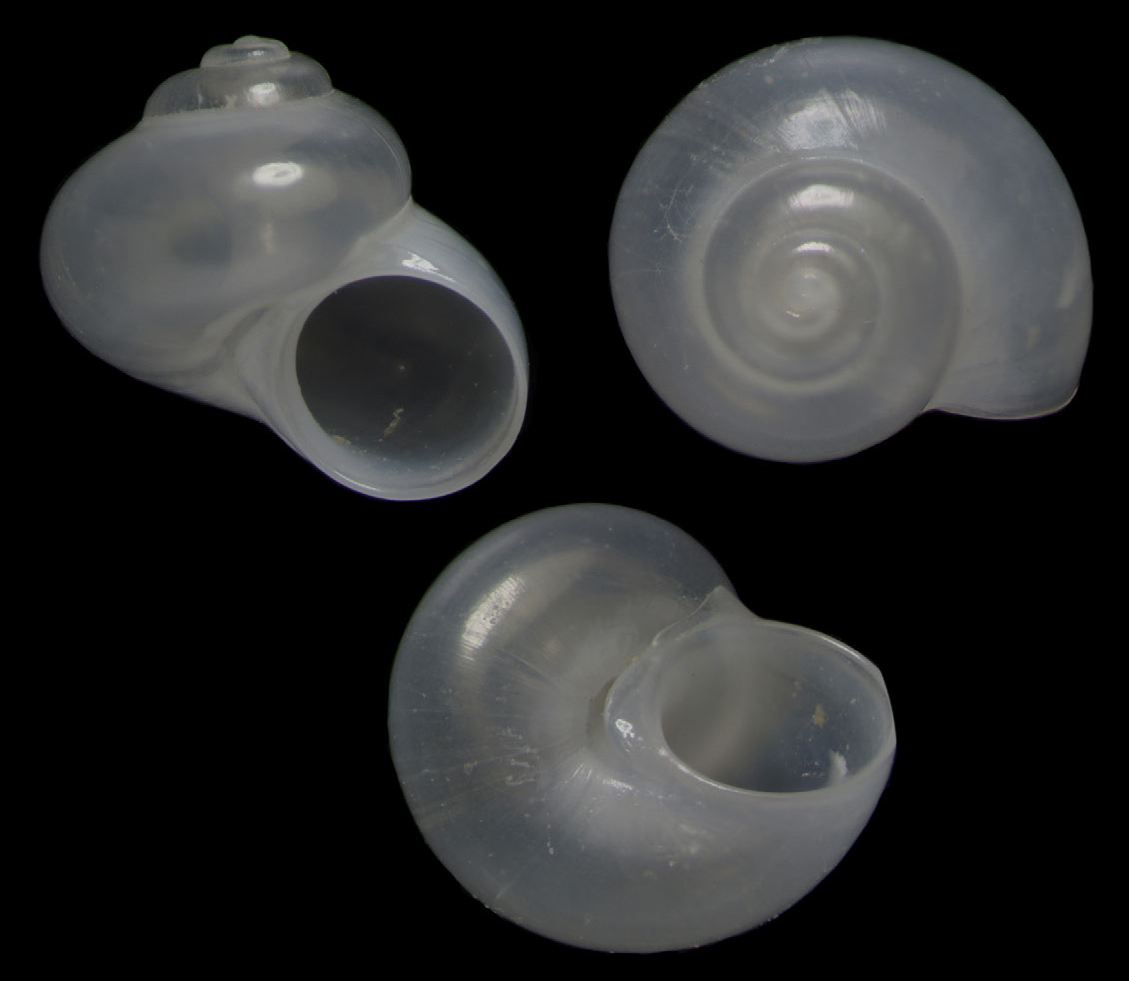
- Shell of Cirsonella romettensis

Scientific classification
- Kingdom: Animalia
- Phylum: Mollusca
- Class: Gastropoda
- Subclass: Vetigastropoda
- Order: Trochida
- Family: Skeneidae
- Genus: Cirsonella
- Species: C. romettensis

Binomial name
- Cirsonella romettensis (Granata-Grillo, 1877)

Synonyms
- Cithna adamsi Jeffreys 1883; Cyclostrema funnazzense de Gregorio, 1889; Oxystele romettensis Granata-Grillo 1877 (basionym); Tharsiella romettensis (Granata-Grillo 1877); Tharsis romettensis Jeffreys 1883

= Cirsonella romettensis =

Species of gastropod

Cirsonella romettensis is a species of sea snail, a marine gastropod mollusk in the family Skeneidae.

== Description ==
The size of the shell varies between 1.1 mm and 2.6 mm.

== Distribution ==
This species occurs in the Mediterranean Sea and in European waters.
