= Dillwynella texana =

- Original image of a shell of Dillwynella texana

Scientific classification
- Kingdom: Animalia
- Phylum: Mollusca
- Class: Gastropoda
- Subclass: Vetigastropoda
- Order: Trochida
- Family: Skeneidae
- Genus: Dillwynella
- Species: D. texana

Binomial name
- Dillwynella texana G. Harris, 1895

Extinct species of gastropod

Dillwynella texana is an extinct species of sea snail, a marine gastropod mollusk in the family Skeneidae.

== Description ==
The shell contains four spiral, smooth, and shining whorls. The body whorl is nearly smooth but shows a slight tendency to bear furrows or lines radiating from the suture. The umbilicus is small. The aperture is round.

== Distribution ==
This marine species was found as a fossil in the Lower Claiborne Eocene, Texas.
