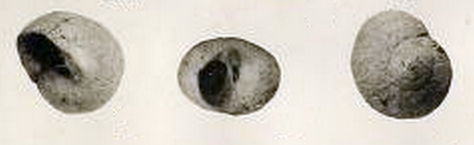
- Original images of a shell of Dillwynella houzeaui

Scientific classification
- Kingdom: Animalia
- Phylum: Mollusca
- Class: Gastropoda
- Subclass: Vetigastropoda
- Order: Trochida
- Family: Skeneidae
- Genus: Dillwynella
- Species: D. houzeaui

Binomial name
- Dillwynella houzeaui M. Cossmann, 1913

= Dillwynella houzeaui =

Extinct species of gastropod

Dillwynella houzeaui is an extinct species of sea snail, a marine gastropod mollusk in the family Skeneidae.

== Description ==
The height of the shell attains 2.5 mm, its diameter 4 mm. The rather small, nacreous shell is wider than high. The surface appears perfectly smooth and glazed with traces of brown wavy lines. The depressed spire has a conoidal shape. It consists of four barely convex whorls, increasing rapidly in size under an apical angle of 160 ° on average. They are separated by linear, clearly visible sutures. The body whorl forms almost the entire shell. It is round at the periphery which is not angular, even if both faces of the shell are rather depressed. The base of the shell is moderately convex, topped in the center with a more whitish coating that thickens toward the aperture to form a flattened and callous auricle at the end of the columellar edge and above a relatively narrow umbilical opening. The aperture is round. The peristome is discontinuous. The outer lip is oblique. The excavated columella is smooth.

== Distribution ==
This marine species was found as a fossil in a coal mine near Mons in Belgium.
