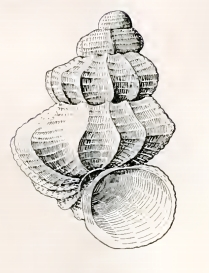
- Original drawing of a shell of Cirsonella cubitalis

Scientific classification
- Kingdom: Animalia
- Phylum: Mollusca
- Class: Gastropoda
- Subclass: Vetigastropoda
- Order: Trochida
- Family: Skeneidae
- Genus: Cirsonella
- Species: C. cubitalis

Binomial name
- Cirsonella cubitalis (Hedley, 1907)

Synonyms
- Cyclostrema cubitale Hedley, C. 1907

= Cirsonella cubitalis =

Species of gastropod

Cirsonella cubitalis is a minute sea snail, a marine gastropod mollusc in the family Skeneidae.

== Description ==
The original description by Charles Hedley (1907):

The height of the shell attains 1.15 mm, its diameter 0.8 mm. The minute, thin, translucent, and perforate shell has a conical shape. Its colour is white. The spire contains four whorls, the first two are rounded and smooth. Its sculpture shows a dozen prominent, distant, thin radial ribs descending the last two whorls perpendicularly, broadening at the periphery. These there produce a marked angle to the contour of the shell. The spiral threads lattice the interspaces and denticulate the edges of the ribs. The round aperture adheres anteriorly to the body whorl for a short space. The outer lip is formed by the last radial rib. The inner lip is a little expanded and reflected. The umbilicus has a narrow perforation.

== Distribution ==
This marine species is endemic to Australia, and was found in the Great Barrier Reef off Queensland at depths between 30 m and 36 m.
