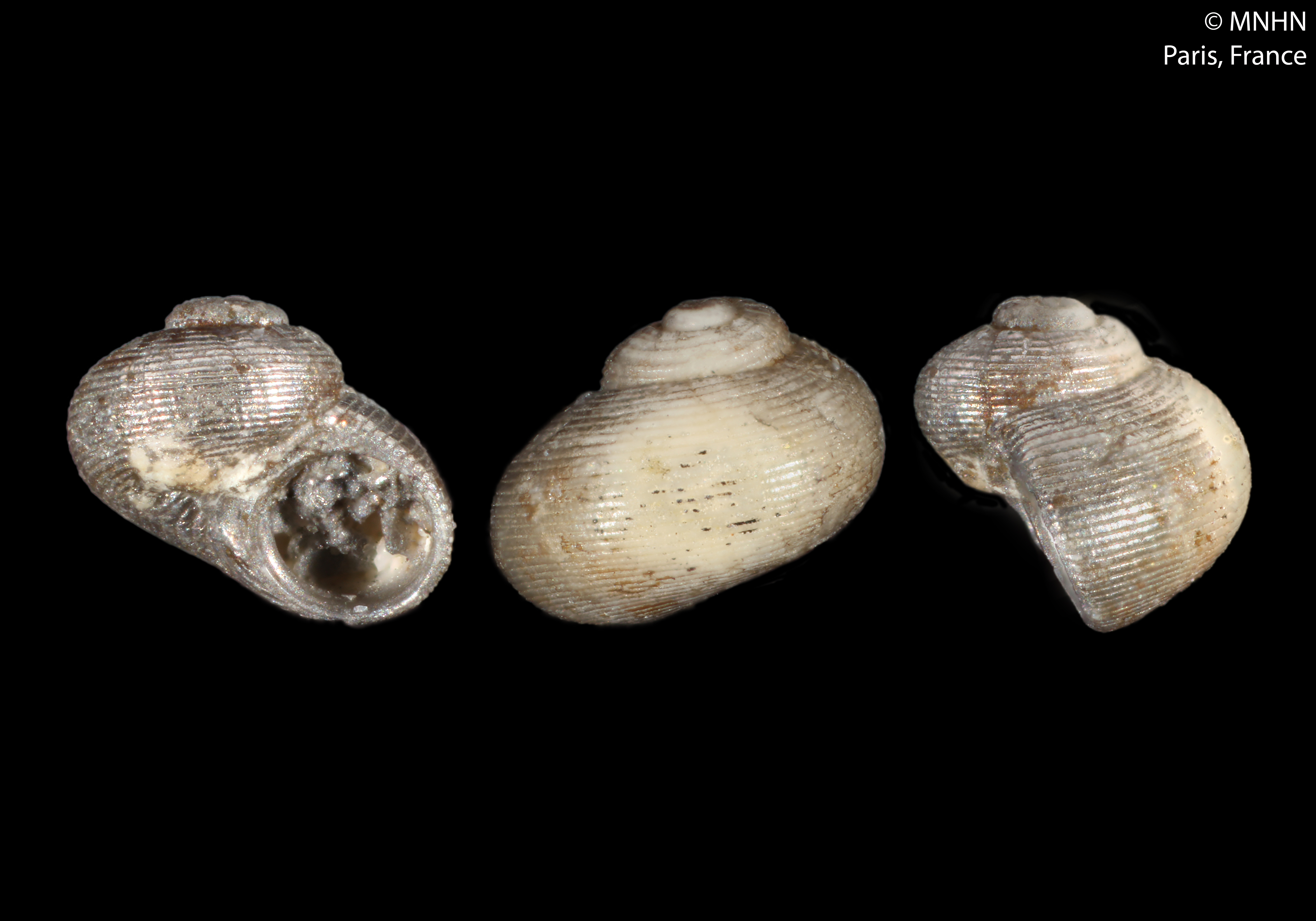
- Shell of † Cirsonella funata (holotype at MNHN, Paris)

Scientific classification
- Kingdom: Animalia
- Phylum: Mollusca
- Class: Gastropoda
- Subclass: Vetigastropoda
- Order: Trochida
- Superfamily: Trochoidea
- Family: Skeneidae
- Genus: Cirsonella; Angas, 1877

Type species
- Cirsonella australis Angas, 1877

Species
- See text

Synonyms
- Porcupinia Cossmann, 1900; Tharsiella Bush, 1897; Tharsis Jeffreys, 1883 (preoccupied by Tharsis Giebel, 1847 (Pisces))

= Cirsonella =

Genus of gastropods

Cirsonella is a genus of small sea snails, marine gastropod molluscs in the family Skeneidae.

== Description ==
(Original description by G. Angas) The minute, smooth shell is globosely turbinate. It is narrowly umbilicated. The aperture is circular. The continuous peristome is slightly thickened.

== Species ==
Species within the genus Cirsonella include:

- † Cirsonella aedicula Laws, 1936
- Cirsonella africana (Bartsch, 1915)
- † Cirsonella ameliae Tabanelli, 1998
- † Cirsonella amplector Laws, 1944
- † Cirsonella aperta L. Hoffman & C. Little, 2025
- Cirsonella ateles (Dautzenberg & H. Fischer, 1896)
- Cirsonella carinata (Hedley, 1903)
- † Cirsonella congrua (Laws, 1941)
- Cirsonella consobrina Powell, 1930
- Cirsonella cubitalis (Hedley, 1907)
- Cirsonella densilirata Suter, 1908
- Cirsonella extrema Thiele, 1912
- Cirsonella floridensis (Dall, 1927)
- † Cirsonella funata Lozouet, 1998
- Cirsonella gaudryi (Dautzenberg & Fischer H., 1896)
- Cirsonella georgiana (Dall, 1927)
- Cirsonella globosa (Pelseneer, 1903)
- Cirsonella kerguelensis Thiele, 1912
- † Cirsonella laevis (R. M. Johnston, 1880)
- Cirsonella laxa Powell, 1937
- Cirsonella maoria Powell, 1937
- Cirsonella margaritiformis (Dall, 1927)
- Cirsonella micans (A. W. B. Powell, 1931)
- Cirsonella microscopia (Gatliff & Gabriel, 1910)
- Cirsonella ovata Hedley, 1899
- Cirsonella paradoxa Powell, 1937
- Cirsonella parvula Powell, 1926
- Cirsonella pisiformis Powell, 1937
- † Cirsonella proava (Marwick, 1931)
- Cirsonella propelaxa Dell, 1956
- Cirsonella reflecta Laseron, 1954
- Cirsonella romettensis (Granata-Grillo, 1877)
- Cirsonella variecostata Powell, 1940
- Cirsonella waikukuensis Powell, 1937
- † Cirsonella waimamakuica Laws, 1948
- Cirsonella weldii (Tenison-Woods, 1877)
- † Cirsonella zeornata Laws, 1948

Species brought into synonymy

- Cirsonella accelerans C. A. Fleming, 1948: synonym of Cirsonella variecostata Powell, 1940
- Cirsonella australis Angas, 1877: synonym of Cirsonella weldii (Tenison-Woods, 1877)
- Cirsonella granum Murdoch and Suter, 1906: synonym of Lissotesta granum (Murdoch & Suter, 1906)
- Cirsonella kerguelenensis [sic]: synonym of Cirsonella kerguelensis Thiele, 1912
- Cirsonella lata (Laseron, 1954): synonym of Wanganella lata (Laseron, 1954)
- Cirsonella naticoides (Hedley, 1907): synonym of Cirsonella weldii (Tenison Woods, 1877)
- Cirsonella neozelanica Murdoch, 1899: synonym of Suterilla neozelanica (Murdoch, 1899)
- Cirsonella perplexa Laseron, 1954: synonym of Cirsonella reflecta Laseron, 1954
- Cirsonella simplex Powell, 1937: synonym of Acremodontina simplex (Powell, 1937)
- Cirsonella translucida May, 1915: synonym of Acremodontina translucida (May, 1915)
