= Zalipais lissa =

Scientific classification
- Kingdom: Animalia
- Phylum: Mollusca
- Class: Gastropoda
- Subclass: Vetigastropoda
- Order: Trochida
- Family: Skeneidae
- Genus: Zalipais
- Species: Z. lissa

Binomial name
- Zalipais lissa (Suter, 1908)

Synonyms
- Cyclostrema lissum Suter, 1908; Delphinoidea lissa Suter, 1908; Unknown lissum Suter, 1908; Zalipais lissum Suter, 1908

Species of gastropod

Zalipais lissa is a species of minute sea snail, a marine gastropod mollusc in the family Skeneidae.

== Description ==
The height of the shell attains 0.6 mm, its diameter 1.0 mm. The thin, yellowish-white shell is minute and has a discoidal shape. It is umbilicated. To the naked eye the shell appears to be quite smooth, but under magnification reveals subequidistant, strongly undulating, radiate threads. No spiral sculpture is visible. The spire is flat, the nucleus only being slightly raised. The protoconch consists of one smooth whorl, which is convex, and the first half very often slightly elevated. The teleoconch consists of two whorls, the last one flatly convex above. The periphery and the baseof the shell are rounded. The suture is impressed. The subcircular aperture is a little angled above. The continuous peristome is sharp. The outer lip is advancing, and producing a distinct notch at the suture. The columella is arcuate and slightly thickened. The open umbilicus is moderate.

== Distribution ==
This marine species occurs off New Zealand and off the Tasmanian coast.
