= Iheyaspira bathycodon =

Conservation status
- Vulnerable (IUCN 3.1)

Scientific classification
- Kingdom: Animalia
- Phylum: Mollusca
- Class: Gastropoda
- Subclass: Vetigastropoda
- Order: Trochida
- Family: Skeneidae
- Genus: Iheyaspira
- Species: I. bathycodon

Binomial name
- Iheyaspira bathycodon Nye, Copley, Linse & Plouviez, 2013

Species of gastropod

Iheyaspira bathycodon, common name the bell-toothed vent top-snail, is a species of small sea snail, a marine gastropod mollusc in the family Skeneidae.

== Distribution ==
This species occurs off the Von Damm Vent Field, Mid-Cayman spreading center, in the Caribbean Sea, at a depth of 2,300 m.
