= Protolira thorvaldssoni =

Scientific classification
- Kingdom: Animalia
- Phylum: Mollusca
- Class: Gastropoda
- Subclass: Vetigastropoda
- Order: Trochida
- Family: Skeneidae
- Genus: Protolira
- Species: P. thorvaldssoni

Binomial name
- Protolira thorvaldssoni Warén, 1996

Synonyms
- Protolira thorvaldsoni (Warén, 1996)

Species of gastropod

Protolira thorvaldssoni is a species of sea snail, a marine gastropod mollusk in the family Skeneidae.

== Description ==
The shell attains a diameter of 2.5 mm.

== Distribution ==
This species occurs along the Mid-Atlantic Ridge off southwestern Iceland found on decaying whalebone at a depth of a few hundred metres.
