= Dasyskenea suavis =

Scientific classification
- Kingdom: Animalia
- Phylum: Mollusca
- Class: Gastropoda
- Subclass: Vetigastropoda
- Order: Trochida
- Family: Skeneidae
- Genus: Dasyskenea
- Species: D. suavis

Binomial name
- Dasyskenea suavis Fasulo & Cretella, 2002

Species of gastropod

Dasyskenea suavis is a species of sea snail, a marine gastropod mollusk in the family Skeneidae.

== Distribution ==
This species occurs off Sicily in the Mediterranean Sea.
