= Wanganella =

Wanganella may refer to:

- Wanganella, New South Wales, a town in Australia
- MS Wanganella, a passenger liner
- Wanganella (gastropod), a genus of sea snails
