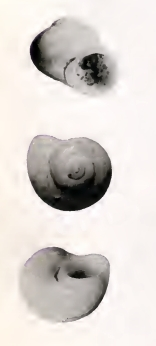
- Original drawing with three views of a shell of Cirsonella gaudryi

Scientific classification
- Kingdom: Animalia
- Phylum: Mollusca
- Class: Gastropoda
- Subclass: Vetigastropoda
- Order: Trochida
- Family: Skeneidae
- Genus: Cirsonella
- Species: C. gaudryi

Binomial name
- Cirsonella gaudryi (Dautzenberg & H. Fischer, 1896)

Synonyms
- Tharsis (?) gaudryi Dautzenberg & H. Fischer, 1896

= Cirsonella gaudryi =

Species of gastropod

Cirsonella gaudryi is a species of sea snail, a marine gastropod mollusk in the family Skeneidae.

== Description ==
The height of the shell attains 2.5 mm. The rather solid, shining, white shell has a turbinate shape. it has a narrow umbilicus. The spire consists of 3½ convex whorls, separated by a marked suture. The surface is smooth, except for the base which contains two or three very faint concentric striae. The circular aperture has a continuous peristome. The columella has a thick callus that connects to the convexity of the penultimate whorl. it covers for the greater part the umbilicus, that is reduced to a narrow, arched chink. The lip is simple.

== Distribution ==
This species occurs in the Atlantic Ocean off the Azores and the Rockall Bank, in the Northeast Atlantic Ocean
