= Cirsonella paradoxa =

Scientific classification
- Kingdom: Animalia
- Phylum: Mollusca
- Class: Gastropoda
- Subclass: Vetigastropoda
- Order: Trochida
- Family: Skeneidae
- Genus: Cirsonella
- Species: C. paradoxa

Binomial name
- Cirsonella paradoxa Powell, 1937

Species of gastropod

Cirsonella paradoxa is a minute sea snail, a marine gastropod mollusc in the family Skeneidae.

== Description ==
The height of the shell attains 1 mm, its diameter is 1.5 mm.

== Distribution ==
This marine species is endemic to New Zealand and is found off Three Kings Islands at a depth of 260 m.
