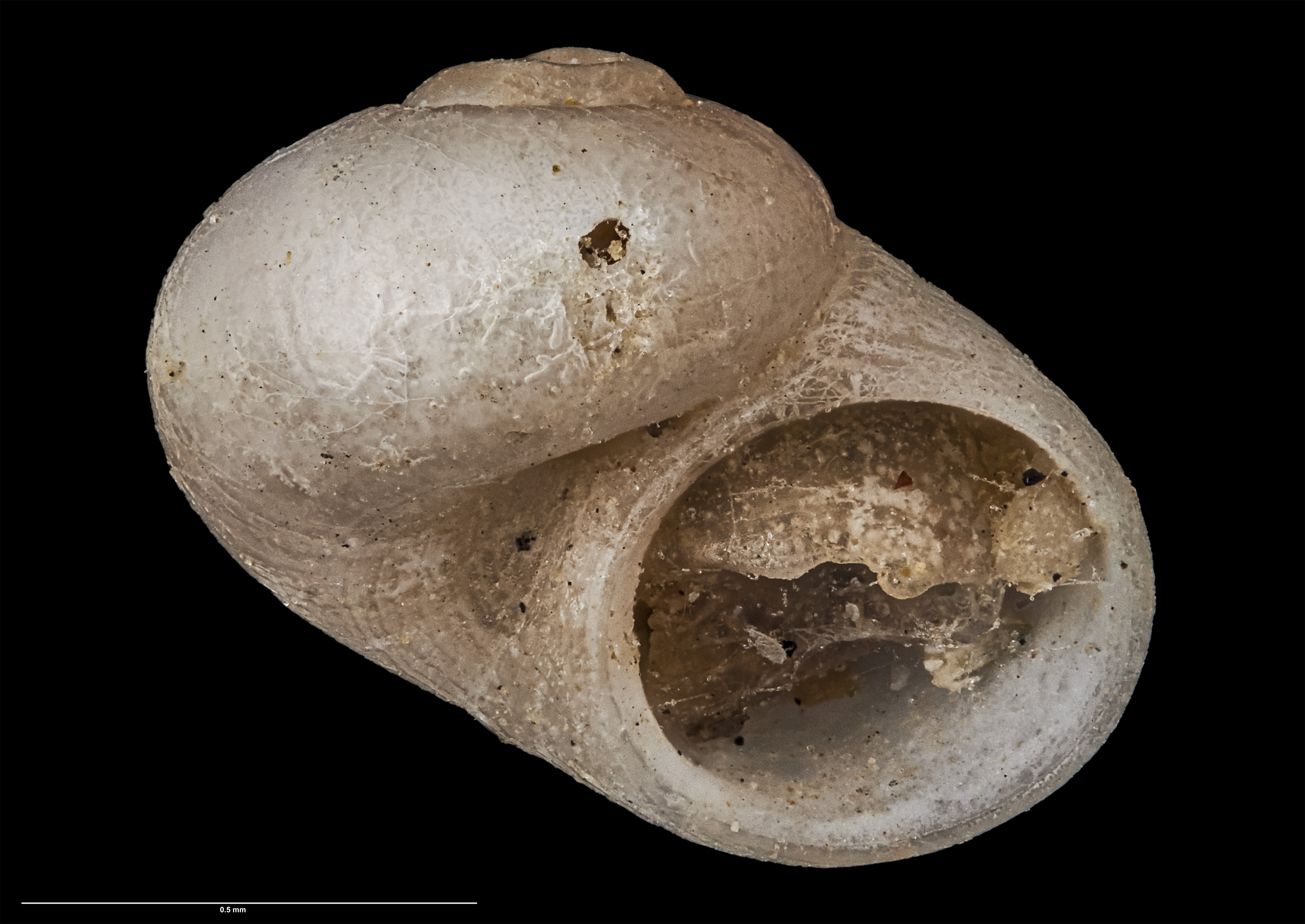

Scientific classification
- Kingdom: Animalia
- Phylum: Mollusca
- Class: Gastropoda
- Subclass: Vetigastropoda
- Order: Trochida
- Family: Skeneidae
- Genus: Cirsonella
- Species: C. consobrina

Binomial name
- Cirsonella consobrina Powell, 1930

= Cirsonella consobrina =

Species of gastropod

Cirsonella consobrina is a minute sea snail, a marine gastropod mollusc in the family Skeneidae.

== Description ==
The height of the shell attains 0.8 mm -, its diameter 1.2 mm.

== Distribution ==
This marine species is endemic to New Zealand and was first found off North Island.
