= Cirsonella waikukuensis =

Scientific classification
- Kingdom: Animalia
- Phylum: Mollusca
- Class: Gastropoda
- Subclass: Vetigastropoda
- Order: Trochida
- Family: Skeneidae
- Genus: Cirsonella
- Species: C. waikukuensis

Binomial name
- Cirsonella waikukuensis Powell, 1937

Species of gastropod

Cirsonella waikukuensis is a minute sea snail, a marine gastropod mollusc in the family Skeneidae.

== Description ==
The height of the shell attains 0.7 mm, its diameter 0.9 mm. Cirsonella waikukuensis is a very small deep-water gastropod. The shell height reaches approximately 0.8 mm and its diameter about 1 mm. The shell is discoidal with a low spire, fine spiral sculpture, and a round aperture.

== Distribution ==
This marine species is endemic to New Zealand and occurs off North Cape at a depth of 29 m.
