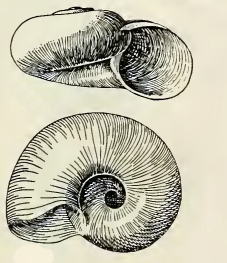
- Original drawing with two views of a shell of Zalipais inscripta

Scientific classification
- Kingdom: Animalia
- Phylum: Mollusca
- Class: Gastropoda
- Subclass: Vetigastropoda
- Order: Trochida
- Family: Skeneidae
- Genus: Zalipais
- Species: Z. inscripta

Binomial name
- Zalipais inscripta (Tate, 1899)

Synonyms
- Cyclostrema inscripta Tate, 1899; Zalipais laseroni Kershaw, 1955

= Zalipais inscripta =

Species of gastropod

Zalipais inscripta is a species of minute sea snail, a marine gastropod mollusc in the family Skeneidae.

== Description ==
The height of the shell attains 1.2 mm, its diameter 2.2 mm. The minute, very fragile shell has a discoidal shape. It is diaphanous and widely umbilicated. The spire is flat, not rising above the plane of the last whorl. The four whorls are convex, with a gentle antesutural slope. The surface of the shell is smooth and shining, but incremental striae are visible under magnification. The aperture is roundly oval, a little wider than high. The peristome of the holotype is incomplete.

== Distribution ==
This marine species is endemic to Australia and occurs off New South Wales, South Australia, Tasmania, Victoria.
