= Dillwynella lignicola =

Scientific classification
- Kingdom: Animalia
- Phylum: Mollusca
- Class: Gastropoda
- Subclass: Vetigastropoda
- Order: Trochida
- Family: Skeneidae
- Genus: Dillwynella
- Species: D. lignicola

Binomial name
- Dillwynella lignicola B.A. Marshall, 1988

Species of gastropod

Dillwynella lignicola is a species of sea snail, a marine gastropod mollusk in the family Skeneidae.

The epithet "lignicola" means "living on wood".

== Description ==
The height of the shell attains 3.5 mm, its diameter 4.05 mm.

== Distribution ==
This marine species is endemic to New Zealand and is found off the Chatham Islands at depths between 1075 m and 1100 m. Dillwynellia lignicola can be also found in Exclusive Economic zone of New Zealand.
