= Cirsonella kerguelensis =

Scientific classification
- Kingdom: Animalia
- Phylum: Mollusca
- Class: Gastropoda
- Subclass: Vetigastropoda
- Order: Trochida
- Family: Skeneidae
- Genus: Cirsonella
- Species: C. kerguelensis

Binomial name
- Cirsonella kerguelensis Thiele, 1912

Species of gastropod

Cirsonella kerguelensis is a species of sea snail, a marine gastropod mollusk in the family Skeneidae. The height of the shell attains 2.3 mm. This species occurs off the Kerguelen Islands, Southern Indian Ocean and off Argentina at a depth of 600 m.
