= Dillwynella fallax =

Scientific classification
- Kingdom: Animalia
- Phylum: Mollusca
- Class: Gastropoda
- Subclass: Vetigastropoda
- Order: Trochida
- Family: Skeneidae
- Genus: Dillwynella
- Species: D. fallax

Binomial name
- Dillwynella fallax Hasegawa, 1997

Species of gastropod

Dillwynella fallax is a species of sea snail, a marine gastropod mollusk in the family Skeneidae.

== Description ==
The size of the shell attains 4 mm.

== Distribution ==
This marine species occurs off Japan and in the East China Sea.
