= Cirsonella georgiana =

Scientific classification
- Kingdom: Animalia
- Phylum: Mollusca
- Class: Gastropoda
- Subclass: Vetigastropoda
- Order: Trochida
- Family: Skeneidae
- Genus: Cirsonella
- Species: C. georgiana

Binomial name
- Cirsonella georgiana (Dall, 1927)

Synonyms
- Vitrinella georgiana Dall, 1927

Species of gastropod

Cirsonella georgiana is a species of sea snail, a marine gastropod mollusk in the family Skeneidae.

== Description ==
The height of the shell attains 2 mm.

== Distribution ==
This species occurs in the Atlantic Ocean off Georgia, United States, at depths of around 805 m.
