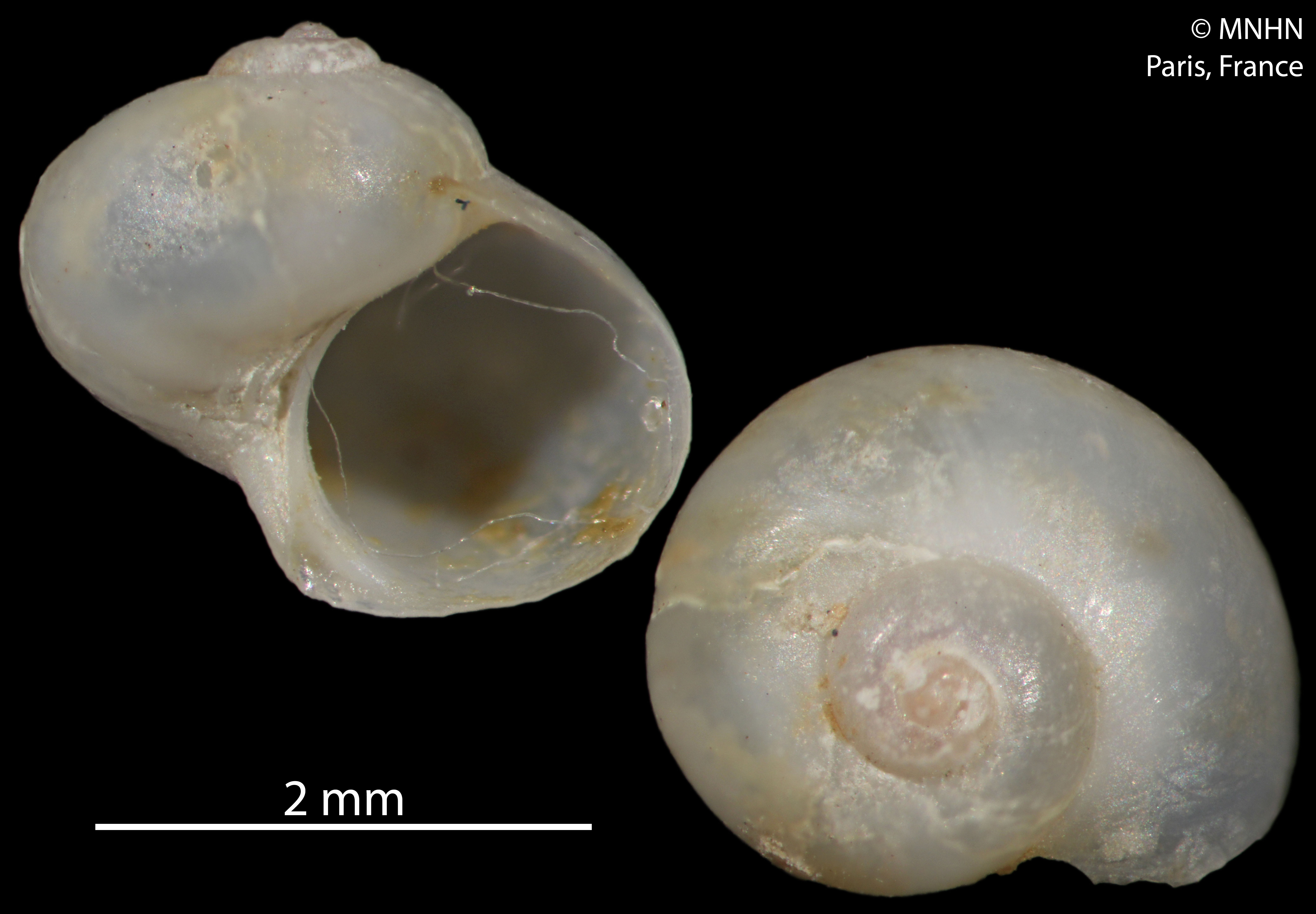
- Shell of Dillwynella haptricola (paratype at MNHN, Paris)

Scientific classification
- Kingdom: Animalia
- Phylum: Mollusca
- Class: Gastropoda
- Subclass: Vetigastropoda
- Order: Trochida
- Superfamily: Trochoidea
- Family: Skeneidae
- Genus: Dillwynella
- Species: D. haptricola

Binomial name
- Dillwynella haptricola B.A. Marshall, 1988

= Dillwynella haptricola =

Species of gastropod

Dillwynella haptricola is a species of sea snail, a marine gastropod mollusk in the family Skeneidae.

== Description ==
The length of the shell attains 3.2 mm, its diameter is 3.6 mm.

== Distribution ==
This marine species is endemic to New Zealand and is found at depths between 1,073 m and 1,116 m.
