= Cirsonella reflecta =

Scientific classification
- Kingdom: Animalia
- Phylum: Mollusca
- Class: Gastropoda
- Subclass: Vetigastropoda
- Order: Trochida
- Family: Skeneidae
- Genus: Cirsonella
- Species: C. reflecta

Binomial name
- Cirsonella reflecta Laseron, 1954

Synonyms
- Cirsonella perplexa Laseron, 1954

Species of gastropod

Cirsonella reflecta is a species of small sea snail, a marine gastropod mollusc in the family Skeneidae.

== Distribution ==
This marine species is endemic to Australia and occurs off New South Wales.
