= Cirsonella margaritiformis =

Scientific classification
- Kingdom: Animalia
- Phylum: Mollusca
- Class: Gastropoda
- Subclass: Vetigastropoda
- Order: Trochida
- Family: Skeneidae
- Genus: Cirsonella
- Species: C. margaritiformis

Binomial name
- Cirsonella margaritiformis (Dall, 1927)

Synonyms
- Circulus margaritiformis (Dall, 1927); Lydiphnis margaritiformis Dall, 1927 (original combination)

Species of mollusc

Cirsonella margaritiformis is a species of sea snail, a marine gastropod mollusk in the family Skeneidae.

== Description ==
The height of the shell attains 4 mm.

== Distribution ==
This species occurs in the Atlantic Ocean off Georgia, United States, at a depth of 538 m.
