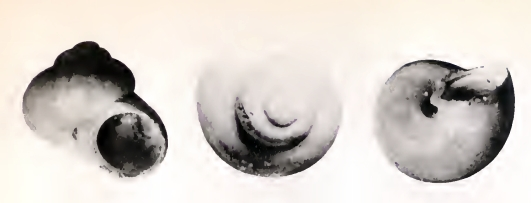
- Original drawing with three views of a shell of Cirsonella ateles

Scientific classification
- Kingdom: Animalia
- Phylum: Mollusca
- Class: Gastropoda
- Subclass: Vetigastropoda
- Order: Trochida
- Family: Skeneidae
- Genus: Cirsonella
- Species: C. ateles

Binomial name
- Cirsonella ateles (Dautzenberg & H. Fischer, 1896)

Synonyms
- Teinostoma ateles Dautzenberg & H. Fischer, 1896; Tharsis (?) ateles Dautzenberg & H. Fischer, 1896

= Cirsonella ateles =

Species of gastropod

Cirsonella ateles is a species of sea snail, a marine gastropod mollusk in the family Skeneidae.

== Description ==
The white shell attains a height of 2 mm, its diameter also 2 mm. It is a rather solid, shining shell with a narrow and deep umbilicus. The apex is obtuse. The spire is composed of four convex whorls, separated by a marked suture. The body whorl goes slightly down to the aperture. The surface is smooth, except for the base of the body whorl, which has, seen from the periphery, low concentric striae, that disappear at a considerable distance from the umbilicus. The circular aperture has a continuous peristome. The columella has a thick, narrow callus that hardly reflects on the umbilical opening in young specimens but cover it completely in adults. The lip is simple.

== Distribution ==
This species occurs in the Atlantic Ocean off the Azores.
