= Cirsonella floridensis =

Scientific classification
- Kingdom: Animalia
- Phylum: Mollusca
- Class: Gastropoda
- Subclass: Vetigastropoda
- Order: Trochida
- Family: Skeneidae
- Genus: Cirsonella
- Species: C. floridensis

Binomial name
- Cirsonella floridensis (Dall, 1927)

Synonyms
- Pseudorotella floridensis Dall, 1927; Teinostoma floridense (Dall, 1927)

Species of gastropod

Cirsonella floridensis is a species of sea snail, a marine gastropod mollusk in the family Skeneidae.
