= Munditiella kirai =

Scientific classification
- Kingdom: Animalia
- Phylum: Mollusca
- Class: Gastropoda
- Subclass: Vetigastropoda
- Order: Trochida
- Family: Skeneidae
- Genus: Munditiella
- Species: M. kirai

Binomial name
- Munditiella kirai (Habe, 1961)

Synonyms
- Liotella kirai Habe, 1961 (original combination)

Species of gastropod

Munditiella kirai is a species of small sea snail, a marine gastropod mollusk in the family Skeneidae.

== Distribution ==
This species occurs in the Pacific Ocean off Japan.
