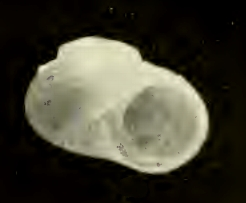
- Original image of a shell of Cirsonella microscopia

Scientific classification
- Kingdom: Animalia
- Phylum: Mollusca
- Class: Gastropoda
- Subclass: Vetigastropoda
- Order: Trochida
- Family: Skeneidae
- Genus: Cirsonella
- Species: C. microscopia

Binomial name
- Cirsonella microscopia (Gatliff & Gabriel, 1910)

Synonyms
- Cyclostrema microscopica Gabriel, C. & Gatliff, J.H. 1910

= Cirsonella microscopia =

Species of gastropod

Cirsonella microscopia is a species of extremely small sea snail, a marine gastropod mollusk or micromollusk in the family Skeneidae.

== Description ==
(Original description by Gatliff & Gabriel:) The diameter of this very minute shell is 0.75 mm. The white, semitranslucent, deeply umbilicated shell consists of four rounded whorls that rapidly increase in size. The apex is smooth, and is succeeded by lirate whorls. The lirae number about five on the penultimate whorl, which increase in number by intercalation to about fifteen at the outer edge of the lip. The aperture is circular. The outer lip is simple.

== Distribution ==
This marine species is endemic to Australia. It occurs off Victoria and the Bass Strait.
