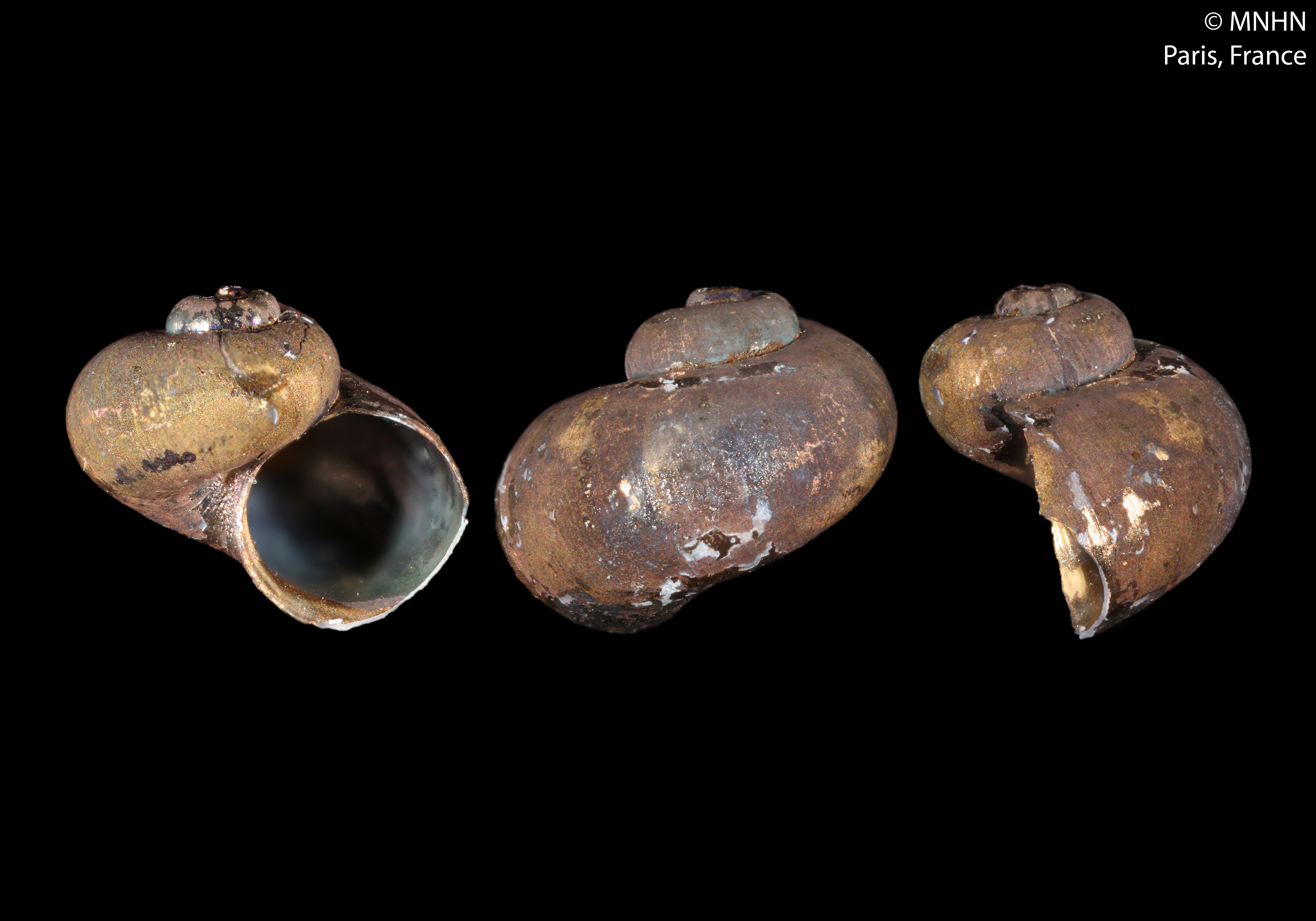
- Shell of Protolira valvatoides (holotype at MNHN, Paris)

Conservation status
- Least Concern (IUCN 3.1)

Scientific classification
- Kingdom: Animalia
- Phylum: Mollusca
- Class: Gastropoda
- Subclass: Vetigastropoda
- Order: Trochida
- Family: Skeneidae
- Genus: Protolira
- Species: P. valvatoides

Binomial name
- Protolira valvatoides Warén & Bouchet, 1993

= Protolira valvatoides =

Species of gastropod

Protolira valvatoides is a species of sea snail, a marine gastropod mollusk in the family Skeneidae.

== Description ==
The shell grows to a length of 3.5 mm.

== Distribution ==
This species is found along the Mid-Atlantic Ridge.
