= Cirsonella laxa =

Scientific classification
- Kingdom: Animalia
- Phylum: Mollusca
- Class: Gastropoda
- Subclass: Vetigastropoda
- Order: Trochida
- Family: Skeneidae
- Genus: Cirsonella
- Species: C. laxa

Binomial name
- Cirsonella laxa Powell, 1937

Species of gastropod

Cirsonella laxa is a minute sea snail, a marine gastropod mollusc in the family Skeneidae.

== Description ==
The height of the shell attains 0.8 mm, its diameter is 1.3 mm.

== Distribution ==
This marine species is endemic to New Zealand. It occurs off Three Kings Islands, Māhia and Snares Islands at a depth of 260 m.
