= Iheyaspira lequios =

Conservation status
- Critically Endangered (IUCN 3.1)

Scientific classification
- Kingdom: Animalia
- Phylum: Mollusca
- Class: Gastropoda
- Subclass: Vetigastropoda
- Order: Trochida
- Family: Skeneidae
- Genus: Iheyaspira
- Species: I. lequios

Binomial name
- Iheyaspira lequios Okutani, Sasaki & Tsuchida, 2000

Species of gastropod

Iheyaspira lequios is a species of sea snail, a marine gastropod mollusk in the family Skeneidae.
