= Lopheliella moundforceae =

Scientific classification
- Kingdom: Animalia
- Phylum: Mollusca
- Class: Gastropoda
- Subclass: Vetigastropoda
- Order: Trochida
- Superfamily: Trochoidea
- Family: Skeneidae
- Genus: Lopheliella
- Species: L. moundforceae

Binomial name
- Lopheliella moundforceae Hoffman, van Heugten & Lavaleye, 2008

Species of gastropod

Lopheliella moundforceae is a species of sea snail, a marine gastropod mollusk in the family Skeneidae.
