= Fucaria striata =

Conservation status
- Near Threatened (IUCN 3.1)

Scientific classification
- Kingdom: Animalia
- Phylum: Mollusca
- Class: Gastropoda
- Subclass: Vetigastropoda
- Order: Trochida
- Family: Skeneidae
- Genus: Fucaria
- Species: F. striata

Binomial name
- Fucaria striata Warén & Bouchet, 1993

Species of gastropod

Fucaria striata is a species of sea snail, a marine gastropod mollusk in the family Skeneidae.

== Distribution ==
This marine species occurs off hydrothermal vents of the Juan de Fuca Ridge.
