= Cirsonella parvula =

Scientific classification
- Kingdom: Animalia
- Phylum: Mollusca
- Class: Gastropoda
- Subclass: Vetigastropoda
- Order: Trochida
- Family: Skeneidae
- Genus: Cirsonella
- Species: C. parvula

Binomial name
- Cirsonella parvula Powell, 1926

Species of gastropod

Cirsonella parvula is a minute sea snail, a marine gastropod mollusc in the family Skeneidae. The holotype is at Canterbury Museum, Christchurch and the Auckland War Memorial Museum holds two paratypes, collected by the New Zealand Government Trawling Expedition in 1907.

== Description ==
The height of the shell attains 0.8 mm, its diameter 0.9 mm. It was first described by Baden Powell in 1926.

== Distribution ==
This species is endemic to New Zealand and is found off South Island.
