= Dillwynella sheisinmaruae =

Scientific classification
- Kingdom: Animalia
- Phylum: Mollusca
- Class: Gastropoda
- Subclass: Vetigastropoda
- Order: Trochida
- Family: Skeneidae
- Genus: Dillwynella
- Species: D. sheisinmaruae

Binomial name
- Dillwynella sheisinmaruae Hasegawa, 1997

Species of gastropod

Dillwynella sheisinmaruae is a species of sea snail, a marine gastropod mollusk in the family Skeneidae.

== Description ==
The size of the shell varies between 2 mm and 3.5 mm.

== Distribution ==
This marine species occurs off Japan.
