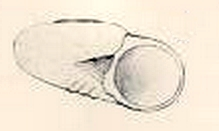
- Original drawing of a shell of Philorene texturata

Scientific classification
- Kingdom: Animalia
- Phylum: Mollusca
- Class: Gastropoda
- Subclass: Vetigastropoda
- Order: Trochida
- Family: Skeneidae
- Genus: Philorene
- Species: P. texturata

Binomial name
- Philorene texturata Oliver, 1915

= Philorene texturata =

Species of gastropod

Philorene texturata is a species of sea snail, a marine gastropod mollusk in the family Skeneidae.

== Description ==
The diameter of the subdiscoidal, deeply umbilicate, white shell attains 2 mm. The spire is flat and contains three whorls. The body whorl is slightly descending and circular in section. Its upper portion is level with the periphery of the penultimate whorl. The aperture is circular. The peristome is continuous and is slightly above and below on the inner side. The suture is deep. The sculpture of the protoconch is smooth. There are regular transverse ridges on the base of the whorls round the umbilicus. The interior of the umbilicus shows spiral ridges terminating at the lower expansion of the inner lip. The whole surface of the shell shows close, regular, low spiral threads, ornamented with transverse lenticular beads.

== Distribution ==
This marine species occurs off the Kermadec Islands.
