= Mikro giustii =

Scientific classification
- Kingdom: Animalia
- Phylum: Mollusca
- Class: Gastropoda
- Subclass: Vetigastropoda
- Order: Trochida
- Family: Skeneidae
- Genus: Mikro
- Species: M. giustii

Binomial name
- Mikro giustii (Bogi & Nofroni, 1989)

Synonyms
- Anekes giustii Bogi & Nofroni, 1989

Species of gastropod

Mikro giustii is a species of sea snail, a marine gastropod mollusk in the family Skeneidae.

== Distribution ==
This species occurs in the Mediterranean Sea at bathyal depth off Italy.
