= Cirsonella propelaxa =

Scientific classification
- Kingdom: Animalia
- Phylum: Mollusca
- Class: Gastropoda
- Subclass: Vetigastropoda
- Order: Trochida
- Family: Skeneidae
- Genus: Cirsonella
- Species: C. propelaxa

Binomial name
- Cirsonella propelaxa Dell, 1956

Species of gastropod

Cirsonella propelaxa is a minute sea snail, a marine gastropod mollusc in the family Skeneidae.

== Description ==
The height of the shell attains 2.5 mm, its diameter 3 mm.

== Distribution ==
This marine species is endemic to New Zealand. It occurs off Chatham Islands.
