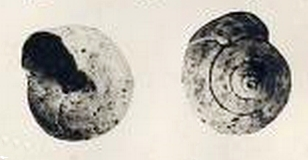
- Original images of a shell of Dillwynella aulacophora

Scientific classification
- Kingdom: Animalia
- Phylum: Mollusca
- Class: Gastropoda
- Subclass: Vetigastropoda
- Order: Trochida
- Family: Skeneidae
- Genus: Dillwynella
- Species: D. aulacophora

Binomial name
- Dillwynella aulacophora M. Cossmann, 1913

= Dillwynella aulacophora =

Extinct species of gastropod

Dillwynella aulacophora is an extinct species of sea snail, a marine gastropod mollusk in the family Skeneidae.

== Description ==
The height of the shell attains 4 mm, its diameter 5 mm. The rather small shell had a trochoid shape. The surface appears smooth and shiny. The depressed spire consists of four or five subangular whorls, equipped with a broad groove between the spiral obsolete angle and slightly protruding bead that comes in above the linear and deep suture. In the middle of this groove, there is a small furrow that marks its deepest point. Above the angle, the profile of the whorls is a slightly convex. The body whorl is equal to five-sixths of the total height simply striated. It is marked by oblique growth lines. The periphery is obtusely subangular, non keeled, but rather rounded. The base of the shell is slightly convex and smooth. The aperture is round. The peristome is discontinuous and thin, except in the columellar region that contains a callosity.

== Distribution ==
This marine species was found as a fossil in a coal mine near Mons in Belgium.
