= Mikro cerion =

Scientific classification
- Kingdom: Animalia
- Phylum: Mollusca
- Class: Gastropoda
- Subclass: Vetigastropoda
- Order: Trochida
- Family: Skeneidae
- Genus: Mikro
- Species: M. cerion

Binomial name
- Mikro cerion (Dall, 1927)

Synonyms
- Vitrinella cerion Dall, 1927

Species of gastropod

Mikro cerion is a species of sea snail, a marine gastropod mollusk in the family Skeneidae.

== Description ==
The size of the shell attains 1.8 mm (0.071 in).

== Distribution ==
This species occurs in the Atlantic Ocean off Georgia, United States, at a depth of 800 m (2,600 ft).
