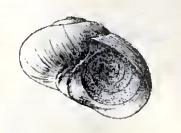
- Original drawing with an apertural view of a shell of Dillwynella modesta

Scientific classification
- Kingdom: Animalia
- Phylum: Mollusca
- Class: Gastropoda
- Subclass: Vetigastropoda
- Order: Trochida
- Family: Skeneidae
- Genus: Dillwynella
- Species: D. modesta

Binomial name
- Dillwynella modesta (Dall, 1889)

Synonyms
- Teinostoma (Dillwynella) modesta Dall, 1889

= Dillwynella modesta =

Species of gastropod

Dillwynella modesta is a species of sea snail, a marine gastropod mollusk in the family Skeneidae.

== Description ==
The height of the shell attains 3 mm, its diameter 4 mm. The smooth, whitish shell is covered with an extremely thin epidermis which rises in microscopic blisters. The rounded, depressed spire has a distinct suture. It consists of three or four whorls. The sculpture shows faint lines of growth except on the base where a single rounded riblet or carina bounds a somewhat concave lunate space outside of the polished columella. The thin, sharp outer lip has a moderate callus on the body. The thick columella is polished. The translucent operculum is yellowish and contains about five turns. The rounded aperture has a slight angle behind.

== Distribution ==
This marine species occurs off St Lucia, Caribbean Sea, at depths between 413 m and 805 m; in the Atlantic Ocean off southeastern Brazil.
