= Cirsonella pisiformis =

Scientific classification
- Kingdom: Animalia
- Phylum: Mollusca
- Class: Gastropoda
- Subclass: Vetigastropoda
- Order: Trochida
- Family: Skeneidae
- Genus: Cirsonella
- Species: C. pisiformis

Binomial name
- Cirsonella pisiformis Powell, 1937

Species of gastropod

Cirsonella pisiformis is a minute sea snail, a marine gastropod mollusc in the family Skeneidae.

== Description ==
The height of the shell attains 1.3 mm, its diameter 1.5 mm.

== Distribution ==
This marine species is endemic to New Zealand. It occurs off Three Kings Islands at a depth of 260 m.
