= Cirsonella micans =

Scientific classification
- Kingdom: Animalia
- Phylum: Mollusca
- Class: Gastropoda
- Subclass: Vetigastropoda
- Order: Trochida
- Superfamily: Trochoidea
- Family: Skeneidae
- Genus: Cirsonella
- Species: C. micans

Binomial name
- Cirsonella micans (Powell, 1931)

Synonyms
- Argalista micans A. W. B. Powell, 1931 superseded combination

Species of mollusk

Cirsonella micans is a species of small sea snail with calcareous opercula, a marine gastropod mollusk in the family Skeneidae.

== Description ==
The height of the shell attains 1.13 mm, its diameter is 1.43 mm.

== Distribution ==
This marine species is endemic to New Zealand, occurring off South Island, Antipodes Islands, and Chatham Islands.
