= Callomphala hoeksemai =

Scientific classification
- Kingdom: Animalia
- Phylum: Mollusca
- Class: Gastropoda
- Subclass: Vetigastropoda
- Order: Trochida
- Family: Skeneidae
- Genus: Callomphala
- Species: C. hoeksemai

Binomial name
- Callomphala hoeksemai Moolenbeek & Hoenselaar, 2008

Species of gastropod

Callomphala hoeksemai is a species of sea snail, a marine gastropod mollusk in the family Skeneidae.

== Description ==
Callomphala hoeksemai belongs to the Skeneidae family, Trochoidea Superfamily, Trochida Order, Vetigastropoda Subclass, Gastropoda Class, Mollusca Phylum, and Animalia Kingdom
