= Pseudorbis jameoensis =

Scientific classification
- Kingdom: Animalia
- Phylum: Mollusca
- Class: Gastropoda
- Subclass: Vetigastropoda
- Order: Trochida
- Family: Skeneidae
- Genus: Pseudorbis
- Species: P. jameoensis

Binomial name
- Pseudorbis jameoensis Rubio & Rodriguez Babio, 1991

Species of gastropod

Pseudorbis jameoensis is a species of small sea snail, a marine gastropod mollusk in the family Skeneidae.

== Description ==
The height of the shell attains 0.72 mm, its diameter is 0.84 mm.

== Distribution ==
This species occurs in the Atlantic Ocean off the Canary Islands.
