= Dillwynella planorbis =

Scientific classification
- Kingdom: Animalia
- Phylum: Mollusca
- Class: Gastropoda
- Subclass: Vetigastropoda
- Order: Trochida
- Family: Skeneidae
- Genus: Dillwynella
- Species: D. planorbis

Binomial name
- Dillwynella planorbis Hasegawa, 1997

Species of gastropod

Dillwynella planorbis is a species of sea snail, a marine gastropod mollusk in the family Skeneidae.

== Description ==
The genus Dillwynella is a classification of various sea snails that Dillwynella Planorbis belongs to. Being a mollusk, the normal height of the shell attains 3 mm and contains various whirls.

== Distribution ==
This marine species occurs off Japan.
