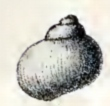
- Drawing of a shell of Lissomphalia bithynoides

Scientific classification
- Kingdom: Animalia
- Phylum: Mollusca
- Class: Gastropoda
- Subclass: Vetigastropoda
- Order: Trochida
- Family: Skeneidae
- Genus: Lissomphalia
- Species: L. bithynoides

Binomial name
- Lissomphalia bithynoides (Monterosato, 1880)

Synonyms
- Anekes sabellii Bogi & Nofroni 1989; Cyclostrema bithynoides Monterosato 1880; Lissospira bithynoides (Jeffreys, 1883)

= Lissomphalia bithynoides =

Species of gastropod

Lissomphalia bithynoides is a species of sea snail, a marine gastropod mollusk in the family Skeneidae.

== Description ==
The thin, whitish shell is narrowly umbilicated. Its maximum reported size is 1 mm. The fine growth lines are crossed by microscopic close-set spiral strife, giving the surface a frosted appearance. The 3½ whorls are rapidly increasing. The body whorl is tumid. The peristome is continuous, but partly adnate.

== Distribution ==
This species occurs in the Atlantic Ocean off Europe and in the Mediterranean Sea.
