= Lopheliella hermesae =

Scientific classification
- Kingdom: Animalia
- Phylum: Mollusca
- Class: Gastropoda
- Subclass: Vetigastropoda
- Order: Trochida
- Superfamily: Trochoidea
- Family: Skeneidae
- Genus: Lopheliella
- Species: L. hermesae

Binomial name
- Lopheliella hermesae Hoffman, van Heugten & Lavaleye, 2008

Species of gastropod

Lopheliella hermesae is a species of sea snail, a marine gastropod mollusk in the family Skeneidae.

== Description ==
The height of the shell attains 2.6 mm, its diameter 2.6 mm.

== Distribution ==
This marine species occurs off the Rockall & Hatton Banks in Northwest Atlantic Ocean, at a depth of 767 m.
