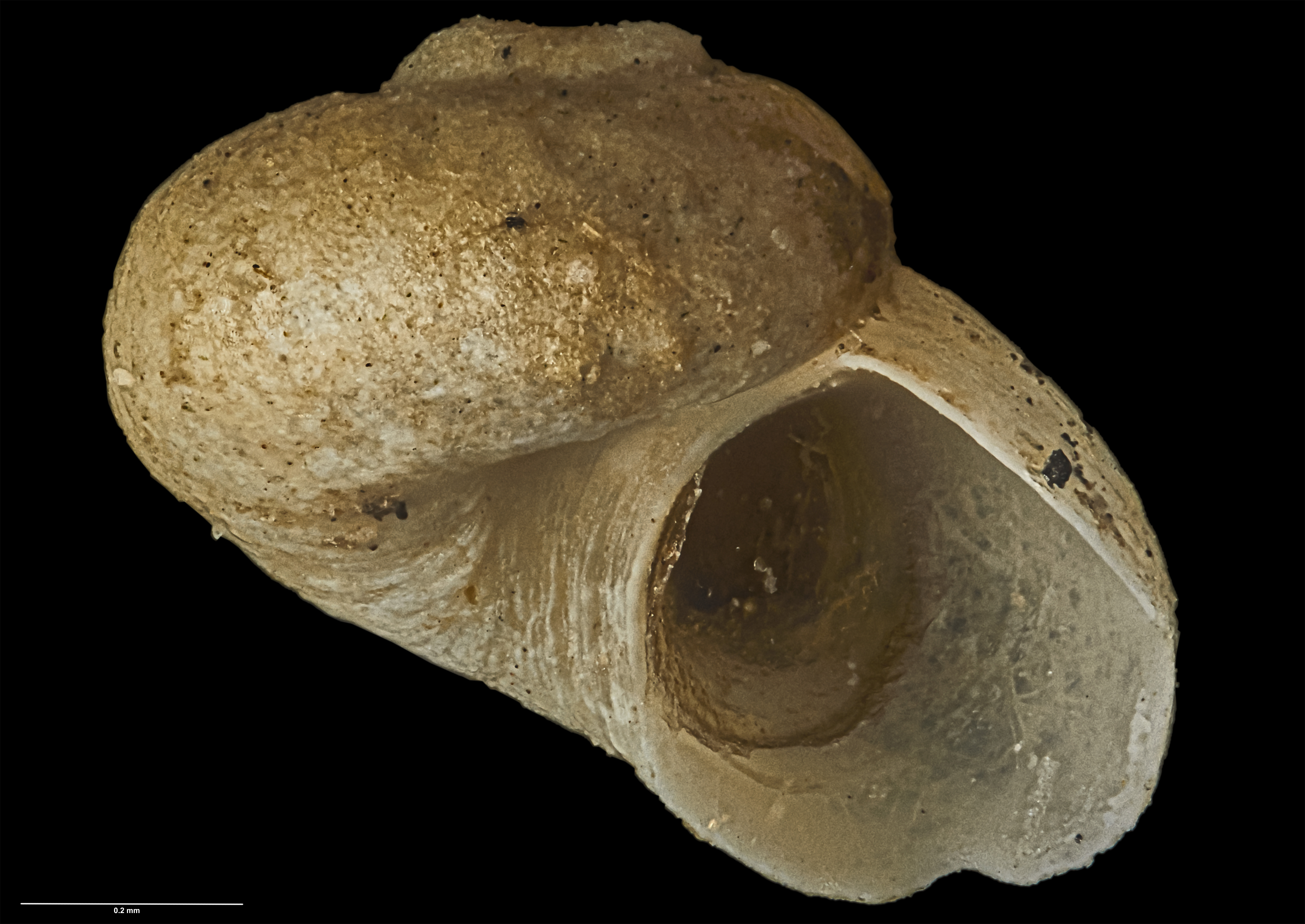

Scientific classification
- Kingdom: Animalia
- Phylum: Mollusca
- Class: Gastropoda
- Subclass: Vetigastropoda
- Order: Trochida
- Family: Skeneidae
- Genus: Zalipais
- Species: Z. turneri

Binomial name
- Zalipais turneri Powell, 1939

= Zalipais turneri =

Species of gastropod

Zalipais turneri is a species of small sea snail, a marine gastropod mollusk in the family Skeneidae.

== Description ==
The shell attains a height of 0.75 mm, its diameter 0.6 mm.

== Distribution ==
This marine species is endemic to New Zealand and occurs on seaweed washings off Stewart Island.
