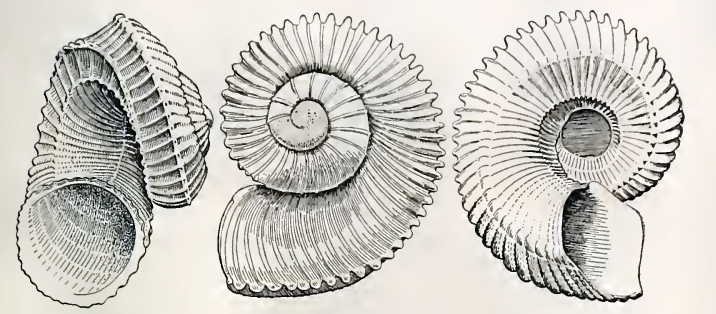
- Original drawing with three views of a shell of Liocarinia disjuncta

Scientific classification
- Kingdom: Animalia
- Phylum: Mollusca
- Class: Gastropoda
- Subclass: Vetigastropoda
- Order: Trochida
- Family: Skeneidae
- Genus: Liocarinia
- Species: L. disjuncta

Binomial name
- Liocarinia disjuncta (Hedley, 1903)

Synonyms
- Liotia disjuncta Hedley, C. 1903

= Liocarinia disjuncta =

Species of gastropod

Liocarinia disjuncta is a species of small sea snail, a marine gastropod mollusk in the family Skeneidae.

== Description ==
(Original description by Ch. Hedley) The height of the shell attains 1.1 mm (0.043 in), its diameter 1.5 mm (0.059 in). This small, pale brown shell has a turbinate shape and is broadly umbilicate. It contains 3 whorls, of which the first 1½ are embryonic. The body whorl is rapidly increasing and descending, at last becoming loose. It is angled at the periphery, at the base and the umbilical margin. The sculpture of the shell shows numerous closely packed strong radial ribs, which project as denticules from the periphery. Between the basal and peripheral angles the ribs descend perpendicularly and are crossed by fine spiral threads. Crossing the base the ribs ascend the umbilicus. The simple aperture is oblique and circular.

The minute size, simple aperture and uncoiling of the body whorl distinguish this species.

== Distribution ==
This marine species is endemic to Australia and occurs off New South Wales at depths between 75 m (246 ft) and 91 m (299 ft).
