= Cirsonella extrema =

Scientific classification
- Kingdom: Animalia
- Phylum: Mollusca
- Class: Gastropoda
- Subclass: Vetigastropoda
- Order: Trochida
- Family: Skeneidae
- Genus: Cirsonella
- Species: C. extrema

Binomial name
- Cirsonella extrema Thiele, 1912

Species of gastropod

Cirsonella extrema is a species of sea snail, a marine gastropod mollusk in the family Skeneidae.

== Description ==
The height of the yellowish white shell attains 2.7 mm, its diameter 2.9 mm. The spire contains 3½ whorls. The round aperture is somewhat oblique. The peristome has a thickened callus, expanded on the left side. Its top is attached to the penultimate whorl. it covers mostly the umbilicus. The brownish operculum is rather thick and consists of polygyrous spirals.

== Distribution ==
This marine species occurs in Antarctic Ocean waters off the South Shetland Islands at depths between 311 m and 426 m.
