= Dasyskenea digeronimoi =

Scientific classification
- Kingdom: Animalia
- Phylum: Mollusca
- Class: Gastropoda
- Subclass: Vetigastropoda
- Order: Trochida
- Family: Skeneidae
- Genus: Dasyskenea
- Species: D. digeronimoi

Binomial name
- Dasyskenea digeronimoi (La Perna, 1998)

Synonyms
- Skeneoides digeronimoi La Perna, 1999 (original combination)

Species of gastropod

Dasyskenea digeronimoi is a species of sea snail, a marine gastropod mollusk in the family Skeneidae.

== Distribution ==
This species occurs in the Mediterranean Sea off Italy.
