= Didianema pauli =

Scientific classification
- Kingdom: Animalia
- Phylum: Mollusca
- Class: Gastropoda
- Subclass: Vetigastropoda
- Order: Trochida
- Family: Skeneidae
- Genus: Didianema
- Species: D. pauli

Binomial name
- Didianema pauli Pilsbry & McGinty, 1945

Synonyms
- Didianema (Diagonaulus) pauli Pilsbry & McGinty, 1945

Species of gastropod

Didianema pauli is a species of sea snail, a marine gastropod mollusk in the family Skeneidae.

== Description ==
The height of the shell attains 1.7 mm.

== Distribution ==
This species occurs in the Gulf of Mexico; in the Atlantic Ocean off North Carolina to Florida.
