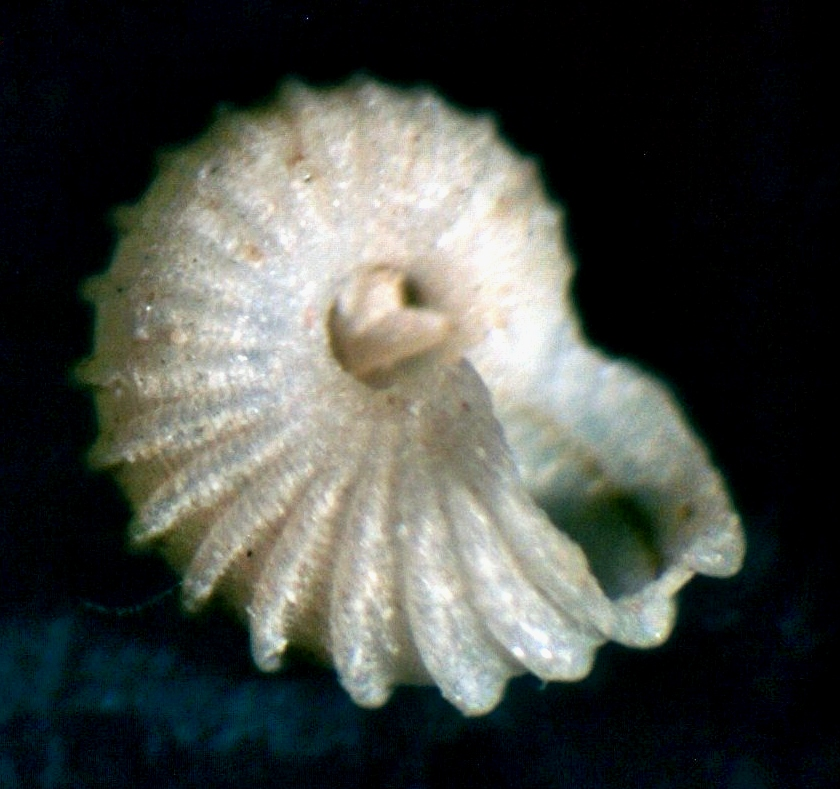
- Apertural view of a shell of Munditiella ammonoceras

Scientific classification
- Kingdom: Animalia
- Phylum: Mollusca
- Class: Gastropoda
- Subclass: Vetigastropoda
- Order: Trochida
- Family: Skeneidae
- Genus: Munditiella; Kuroda & Habe, 1954

Type species
- Cyclostrema ammonoceras A. Adams, 1863

= Munditiella =

Genus of gastropods

Munditiella is a genus of sea snails, marine gastropod mollusks in the family Skeneidae.

== Species ==
Species within the genus Munditiella include:

- Munditiella ammonoceras (A. Adams, 1863)
- Munditiella kirai (Habe, 1961)
- Munditiella qualum (Hedley, 1899)
