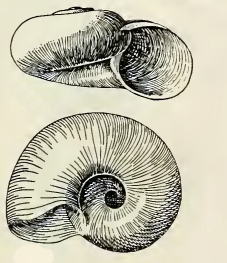
- Drawing with two views of a shell of Zalipais inscripta

Scientific classification
- Kingdom: Animalia
- Phylum: Mollusca
- Class: Gastropoda
- Subclass: Vetigastropoda
- Order: Trochida
- Family: Skeneidae
- Genus: Zalipais; Iredale, 1915

Type species
- Cyclostrema lissum Suter, 1908

Species
- See text

= Zalipais =

Zalipais Temporal range: Lower Pliocene to Recent

Genus of gastropods

Zalipais is a genus of minute sea snails or micromollusks, marine gastropod molluscs in the family Skeneidae.

== Species ==
Species within the genus Zalipais include:

- Zalipais benthicola Powell, 1927
- Zalipais bruniense Beddome, 1883
- Zalipais inscripta (Tate, R., 1899)
- Zalipais lissa (Suter, 1908)
- Zalipais parva Finlay, 1924
- Zalipais turneri Powell, 1939

Species brought into synonymy

- Zalipais laseroni Kershaw, 1955: synonym of Zalipais inscripta (Tate, R., 1899)
