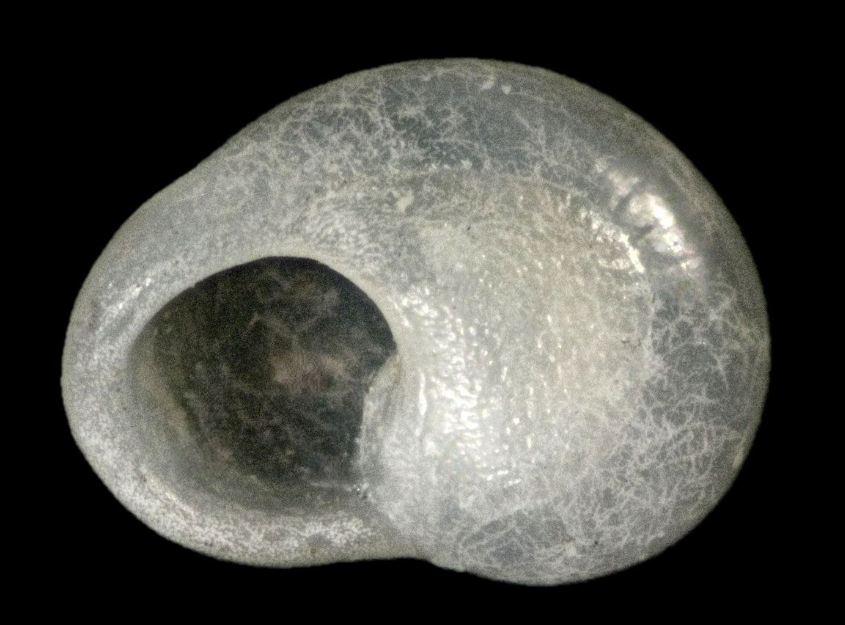
- Shell of Callomphala lucida (specimen at Naturalis Biodiversity Center)

Scientific classification
- Kingdom: Animalia
- Phylum: Mollusca
- Class: Gastropoda
- Subclass: Vetigastropoda
- Order: Trochida
- Family: Skeneidae
- Genus: Callomphala
- Species: C. lucida

Binomial name
- Callomphala lucida (A. Adams & Angas, 1864)

Synonyms
- Callomphala alta Laseron, 1954; Neritula (Callomphala) lucida A. Adams & Angas, 1864; Teinostoma lucida Hedley, 1899 (not Teinostoma lucidum A. Adams, 1863)

= Callomphala lucida =

Species of gastropod

Callomphala lucida, common name the bright liotia, is a species of small sea snail, a marine gastropod mollusk in the family Skeneidae.

== Description ==
This species has a white, shining, pellucid, depressed, shell with the aperture right in front.

(Original description) The shell is orbicular, depressed, and imperforate. The spire is small with an acute apex. The entire shell is white, semipellucid, and shining, and is very densely striated in a radial pattern.

There are four whorls which are flat in profile; the body whorl is obtusely angled at the periphery. The sutures are impressed, and the umbilical region is covered by an opaque, white, and granular callus. The aperture is circular and remains entire at the anterior end. The inner lip is furnished with a small, angled callus, while the outer lip is reflected over the penultimate whorl, with its margin being reinforced by an incrassated white callus.

== Distribution ==
This marine species occurs off New South Wales, Victoria, and Tasmania, Australia.
