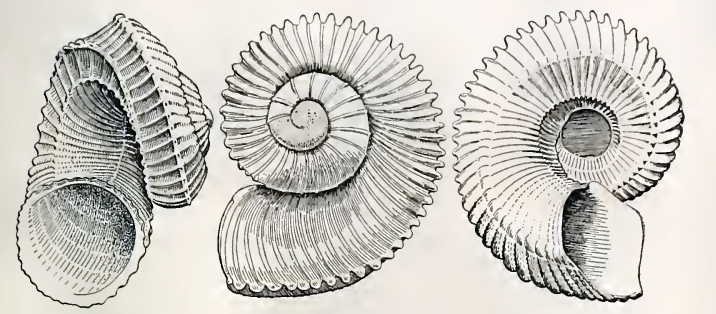
- Liocarinia disjuncta

Scientific classification
- Kingdom: Animalia
- Phylum: Mollusca
- Class: Gastropoda
- Subclass: Vetigastropoda
- Order: Trochida
- Superfamily: Trochoidea
- Family: Skeneidae
- Genus: Liocarinia; Laseron, 1954

= Liocarinia =

Genus of gastropods

Liocarinia is a genus of sea snails, marine gastropod mollusks in the family Skeneidae.

== Species ==
Species within the genus Liocarinia include:

- Liocarinia disjuncta (Hedley, 1903)
