= Parisanda =

Scientific classification
- Kingdom: Animalia
- Phylum: Mollusca
- Class: Gastropoda
- Subclass: Vetigastropoda
- Order: Trochida
- Family: Skeneidae
- Genus: Parisanda; Laseron, 1954

Type species
- Parisanda iredalei Laseron, 1954

Species
- See text

Genus of gastropods

Parisanda is a genus of minute sea snails or micromolluscs, marine gastropod molluscs in the family Skeneidae.

== Species ==
Species within the genus Parisanda include:

- Parisanda iredalei Laseron, 1954
