= Partubiola =

Scientific classification
- Kingdom: Animalia
- Phylum: Mollusca
- Class: Gastropoda
- Subclass: Vetigastropoda
- Order: Trochida
- Family: Skeneidae
- Genus: Partubiola; Iredale, 1936

Type species
- Partubiola blancha Iredale, 1936

Species
- See text

Genus of gastropods

Partubiola is a genus of minute sea snails or micromolluscs, marine gastropod molluscs in the family Skeneidae.

== Species ==
Species within the genus Partubiola include:

- Partubiola blancha Iredale, 1936
