= Iheyaspira =

Scientific classification
- Kingdom: Animalia
- Phylum: Mollusca
- Class: Gastropoda
- Subclass: Vetigastropoda
- Order: Trochida
- Family: Skeneidae
- Genus: Iheyaspira; Okutani, Sasaki & Tsuchida, 2000

Type species
- Iheyaspira lequios Okutani, Sasaki & Tsuchida, 2000

Genus of gastropods

Iheyaspira is a genus of sea snails, marine gastropod mollusks in the family Skeneidae.

== Species ==
Species within the genus Iheyaspira include:

- Iheyaspira bathycodon Nye, Copley, Linse & Plouviez, 2013
- Iheyaspira lequios Okutani, Sasaki & Tsuchida, 2000
