= Philorene =

Scientific classification
- Kingdom: Animalia
- Phylum: Mollusca
- Class: Gastropoda
- Subclass: Vetigastropoda
- Order: Trochida
- Family: Skeneidae
- Genus: Philorene; Oliver, 1915

Type species
- Philorene texturata Oliver, W.R.B., 1915

Genus of gastropods

Philorene is a genus of sea snails, marine gastropod mollusks in the family Skeneidae.

== Description ==
The subdiscoidal shell is umbilicate. The spire is depressed. The whorls are rounded and the body whorl is descending. The aperture is circular. The peristome is continuous.

== Species ==
Species within the genus Philorene include:

- Philorene texturata Oliver, 1915
