= Wanganella porcellana =

Scientific classification
- Kingdom: Animalia
- Phylum: Mollusca
- Class: Gastropoda
- Subclass: Vetigastropoda
- Family: incertae sedis
- Genus: Wanganella
- Species: W. porcellana

Binomial name
- Wanganella porcellana (Tate & May, 1900)

Synonyms
- Conicella lacuna Laseron, 1954; Cyclostrema porcellana Tate & May, 1900; Putilla lacuna Laseron, C.F., 1954; Putilla porcellana (Tate & May, 1900); Rissoa pertranslucida May, 1912; Wanganella fissura Laseron, 1954

Species of gastropod

Wanganella porcellana, the porcellain false top shell, is a species of sea snail, a marine gastropod mollusk, unassigned in the superfamily Seguenzioidea.

== Description ==
The shell grows to a height of 2.3 mm.

== Distribution ==
This marine species occurs off Queensland, Southwest Australia and Tasmania.
