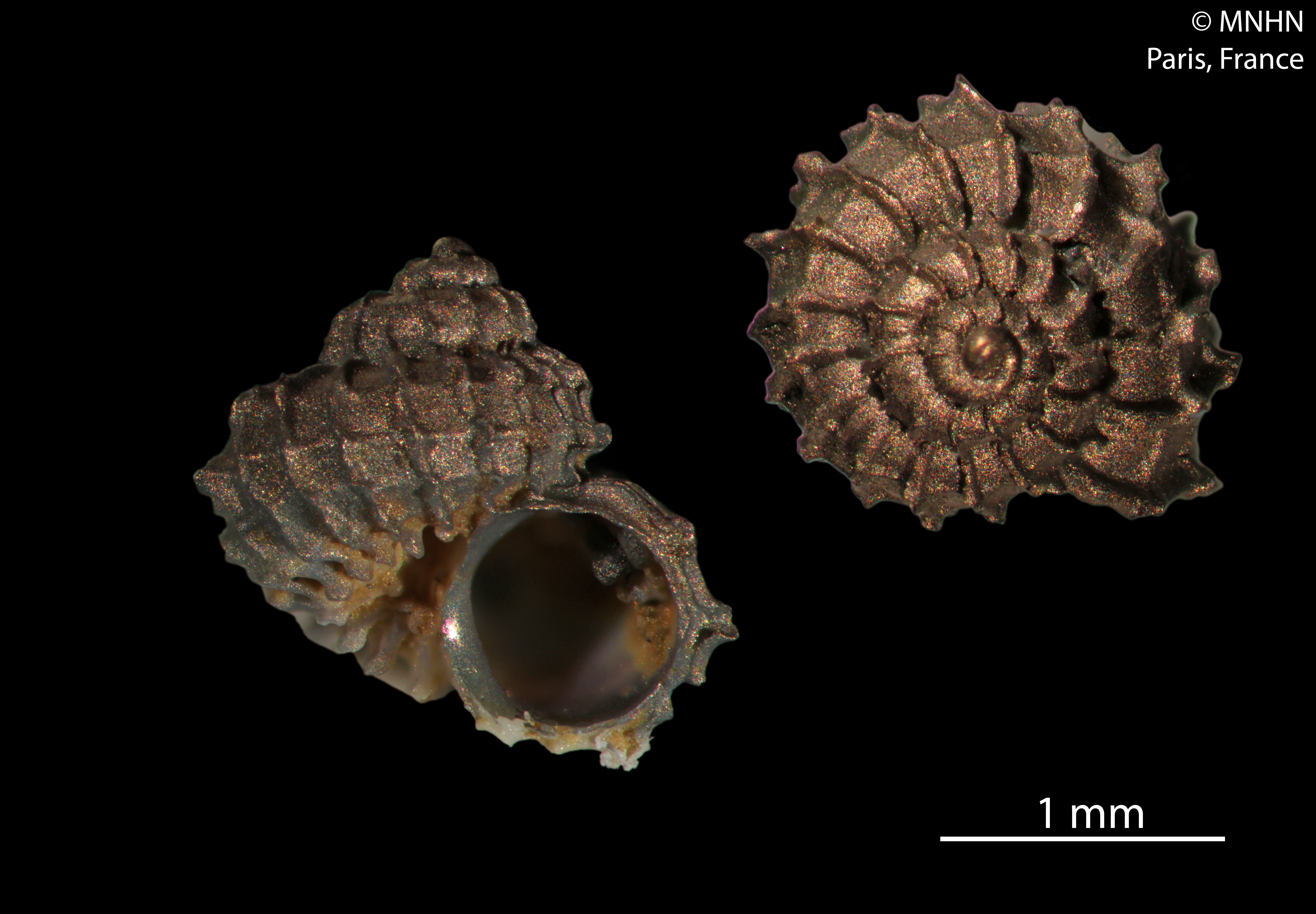
- Shell of † Spinobrookula camiadeorum (paratype at MNHN, Paris)

Scientific classification
- Kingdom: Animalia
- Phylum: Mollusca
- Class: Gastropoda
- Subclass: Vetigastropoda
- Order: Trochida
- Superfamily: Trochoidea
- Family: Skeneidae
- Genus: †Spinobrookula; Lozouet & Maestrati, 1982

Type species
- † Spinobrookula camiadeorum Lozouet & Maestrati, 1982

= Spinobrookula =

Genus of gastropods

Spinobrookula is an extinct genus of sea snails, marine gastropod mollusks in the family Skeneidae.

== Species ==
- † Spinobrookula camiadeorum Lozouet & Maestrati, 1982
