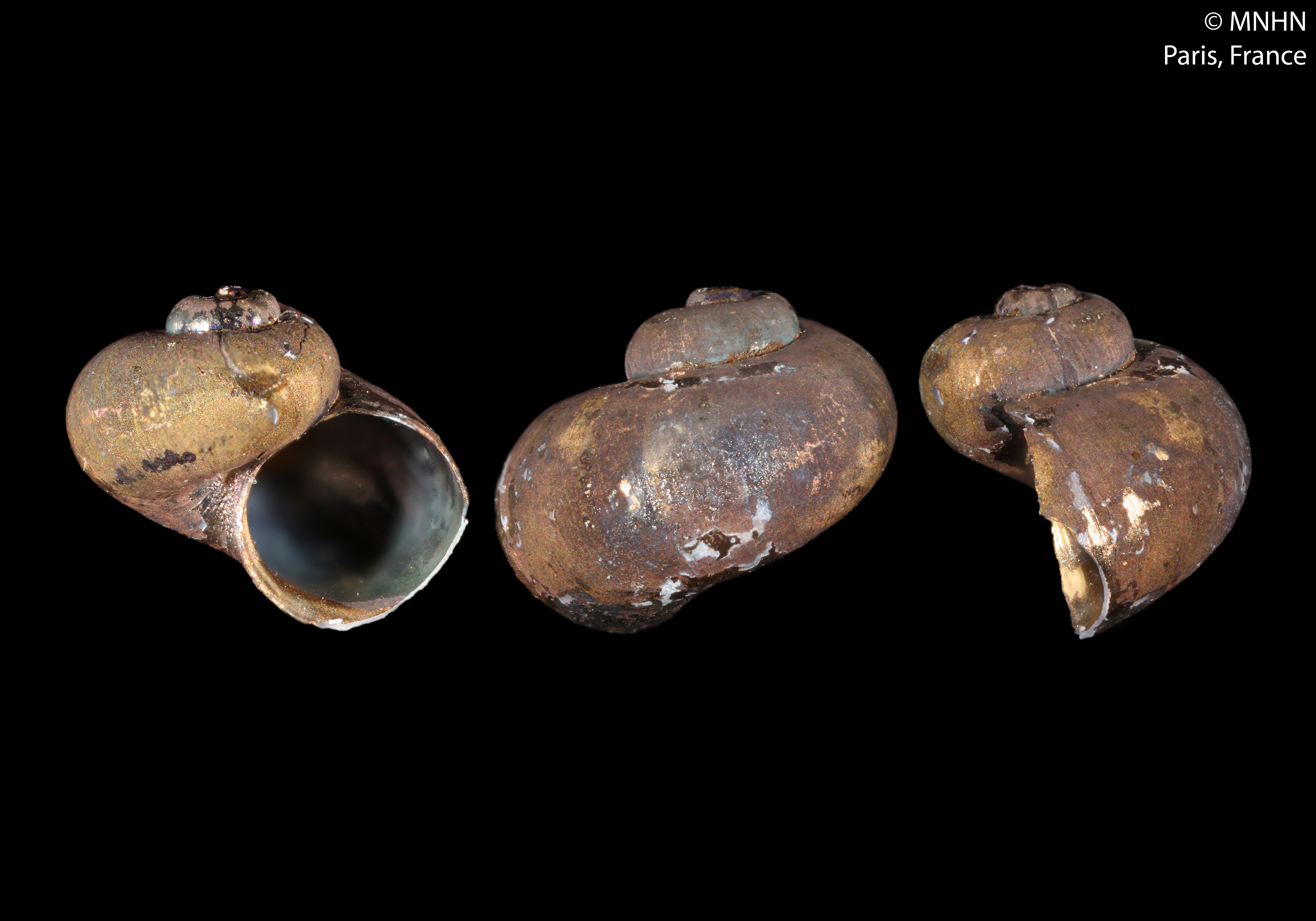
- Shell of Protolira valvatoides

Scientific classification
- Kingdom: Animalia
- Phylum: Mollusca
- Class: Gastropoda
- Subclass: Vetigastropoda
- Order: Trochida
- Family: Skeneidae
- Genus: Protolira; Waren & Bouchet, 1993

Type species
- Protolira valvatoides Warén & Bouchet, 1993

= Protolira =

Genus of gastropods

Protolira is a genus of sea snails, marine gastropod mollusks in the family Skeneidae.

== Species ==
Species within the genus Protolira include:

- Protolira thorvaldssoni Warén, 1996
- Protolira valvatoides Warén & Bouchet, 1993

Species brought into synonymy

- Protolira thorvaldsoni Warén, 1996: synonym of Protolira thorvaldssoni Warén, 1996
