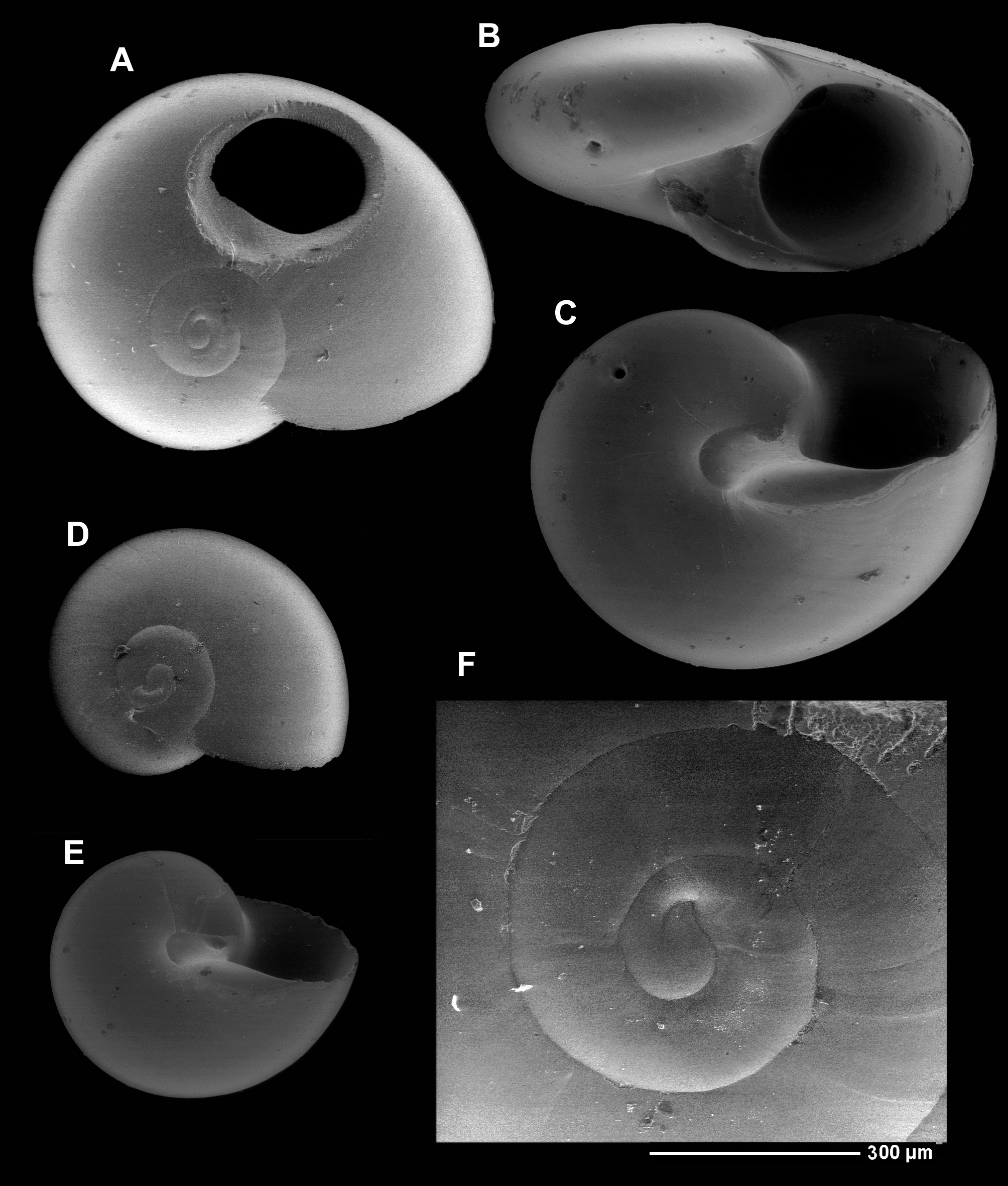
- Shell of Seamountiella caledonica (holotype at MNHN, Paris)

Scientific classification
- Kingdom: Animalia
- Phylum: Mollusca
- Class: Gastropoda
- Subclass: Vetigastropoda
- Order: Trochida
- Superfamily: Trochoidea
- Family: Skeneidae
- Genus: Seamountiella; Rubio, Gofas & Rolán, 2019

= Seamountiella =

Genus of gastropods

Seamountiella is a genus of sea snails, marine gastropod mollusks in the family Skeneidae.

== Species ==
- Seamountiella azorica (Dautzenberg & H. Fischer, 1896)
- Seamountiella caledonica Rubio, Gofas & Rolán, 2019
- Seamountiella dimidia Rubio, Gofas & Rolán, 2019
- Seamountiella mayottensis Rubio, Gofas & Rolán, 2019
