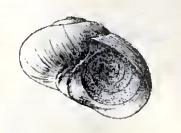
- Apertural view of a shell of Dillwynella modesta

Scientific classification
- Kingdom: Animalia
- Phylum: Mollusca
- Class: Gastropoda
- Subclass: Vetigastropoda
- Order: Trochida
- Family: Skeneidae
- Genus: Dillwynella; Dall, 1889

Type species
- Teinostoma (Dillwynella) modesta Dall, 1889

= Dillwynella =

Genus of gastropods

Dillwynella is a genus of sea snails, marine gastropod mollusks in the family Skeneidae.

The genus name of Dillwynella is in honour of Lewis Weston Dillwyn (1778 – 1855), who was a British porcelain manufacturer, naturalist and Whig Member of Parliament (MP).

== Description ==
The minute, depressed, porcellanous shell has a thin horny operculum. It consists of comparatively few whorls. The shell is imperforate, but with a depression bounded by a riblet in the umbilical rib outside of the columella. The few whorls have a thin fugacious epidermis. The outer lip is thin . The columella has no teeth, projections, or folds, passing smoothly into the anterior margin.

== Species ==
Species within the genus Dillwynella include:

- † Dillwynella aulacophora Cossmann, 1913
- Dillwynella fallax Hasegawa, 1997
- Dillwynella haptricola B.A. Marshall, 1988
- † Dillwynella houzeaui Cossmann, 1913
- Dillwynella ingens B.A. Marshall, 1988
- Dillwynella lignicola B.A. Marshall, 1988
- Dillwynella modesta (Dall, 1889)
- Dillwynella planorbis Hasegawa, 1997
- Dillwynella sheisinmaruae Hasegawa, 1997
- † Dillwynella texana G. Harris, 1895
- Dillwynella vitrea Hasegawa, 1997
- Dillwynella voightae Kunze, 2011
