= Didianema =

Scientific classification
- Kingdom: Animalia
- Phylum: Mollusca
- Class: Gastropoda
- Subclass: Vetigastropoda
- Order: Trochida
- Family: Skeneidae
- Genus: Didianema; Woodring, 1928

Genus of gastropods

Didianema is a genus of sea snails, marine gastropod mollusks in the family Skeneidae.

Older taxonomies categorized this genus in the family Trochidae or Turbinidae.

== Species ==
Species within the genus Didianema include:

- Didianema pauli Pilsbry & McGinty, 1945
