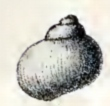

Scientific classification
- Kingdom: Animalia
- Phylum: Mollusca
- Class: Gastropoda
- Subclass: Vetigastropoda
- Order: Trochida
- Family: Skeneidae
- Genus: Lissomphalia; Waren, 1992

= Lissomphalia =

Genus of gastropods

Lissomphalia is a genus of sea snails, marine gastropod mollusks in the family Skeneidae.

== Species ==
Species within the genus Lissomphalia include:

- Lissomphalia bithynoides (Monterosato, 1880)
