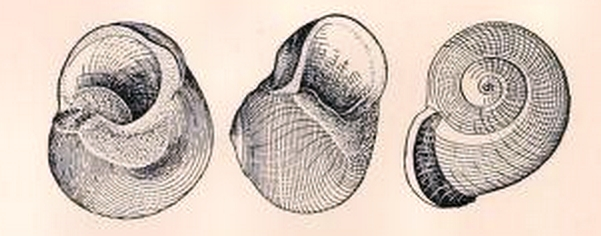
- Original drawing with three views of a shell of Callomphala globosa

Scientific classification
- Kingdom: Animalia
- Phylum: Mollusca
- Class: Gastropoda
- Subclass: Vetigastropoda
- Order: Trochida
- Superfamily: Trochoidea
- Family: Skeneidae
- Genus: Callomphala; A. Adams & Angas, 1864

Type species
- Neritula (Callomphala) lucida A. Adams & Angas, 1864

Synonyms
- Teinostoma (Callomphala) Adams & Angas, 1864

= Callomphala =

Genus of gastropods

Callomphala is a genus of sea snails, marine gastropod mollusks in the family Skeneidae.

Callomphala is considered by the Australian Faunal Directory as a synonym of Teinostoma (Callomphala) Adams & Angas, 1864, belonging to the family Tornidae The genus Teinostoma used to be placed within the family Skeneidae.

== Species ==
Species within the genus Callomphala include:

- Callomphala globosa Hedley, 1901
- Callomphala hoeksemai Moolenbeek & Hoenselaar, 2008
- Callomphala lucida (A. Adams & Angas, 1864)

Species brought into synonymy

- Callomphala alta Laseron, 1954: synonym of Callomphala lucida (A. Adams & Angas, 1864)
