= Lopheliella =

Scientific classification
- Kingdom: Animalia
- Phylum: Mollusca
- Class: Gastropoda
- Subclass: Vetigastropoda
- Order: Trochida
- Family: Skeneidae
- Genus: Lopheliella; Hoffman, van Heugten & Lavaleye, 2008

Type species
- Lopheliella rockallensis Hoffman, L., B. van Heugten & M.S.S. Lavalaye, 2008

Genus of gastropods

Lopheliella is a genus of sea snails, marine gastropod mollusks in the family Skeneidae.

== Species ==
Species within the genus Lopheliella include:

- Lopheliella hermesae Hoffman, van Heugten & Lavaleye, 2008
- Lopheliella moolenbeeki Hoffman, van Heugten & Lavaleye, 2008
- Lopheliella moundforceae Hoffman, van Heugten & Lavaleye, 2008
- Lopheliella rockallensis Hoffman, van Heugten & Lavaleye, 2008
