= Dasyskenea =

Scientific classification
- Kingdom: Animalia
- Phylum: Mollusca
- Class: Gastropoda
- Subclass: Vetigastropoda
- Order: Trochida
- Superfamily: Trochoidea
- Family: Skeneidae
- Genus: Dasyskenea; Fasulo & Cretella, 2003

Type species
- Dasyskenea suavis Fasulo & Cretella, 2003

Genus of gastropods

Dasyskenea is a genus of sea snails, marine gastropod mollusks in the family Skeneidae.

== Species ==
Species within the genus Dasyskenea include:

- Dasyskenea dibellai Nofroni, Renda, Agamennone & Giacobbe, 2022
- Dasyskenea digeronimoi (La Perna, 1998)
- Dasyskenea nilarum (Engl, 1996)
- Dasyskenea suavis Fasulo & Cretella, 2002
- Dasyskenea victori (Segers, Swinnen & De Prins, 2009)
