= Tasmocrossea benthicola =

Scientific classification
- Kingdom: Animalia
- Phylum: Mollusca
- Class: Gastropoda
- Subclass: Vetigastropoda
- Order: Trochida
- Family: Skeneidae
- Genus: Tasmocrossea
- Species: T. benthicola

Binomial name
- Tasmocrossea benthicola Dell, 1952

Species of gastropod

Tasmocrossea benthicola is a species of very small sea snail, a marine gastropod mollusk or micromollusk in the family Skeneidae.

This is the only species in the genus Tasmocrossea, a monotypic genus.

== Description ==
The height of the shell attains 1.05 mm, its diameter is 0.97 mm.

== Distribution ==
This marine species is endemic to New Zealand and occurs off the Lord Howe Rise in the Tasman Sea at a depth of 536 m.
