= Lopheliella rockallensis =

Scientific classification
- Kingdom: Animalia
- Phylum: Mollusca
- Class: Gastropoda
- Subclass: Vetigastropoda
- Order: Trochida
- Superfamily: Trochoidea
- Family: Skeneidae
- Genus: Lopheliella
- Species: L. rockallensis

Binomial name
- Lopheliella rockallensis Hoffman, van Heugten & Lavaleye, 2008

Species of gastropod

Lopheliella rockallensis is a species of sea snail, a marine gastropod mollusc in the family Skeneidae.

== Description ==
The species is described as having a cyrtoconoid outline, with a height of 2.7 mm, width 2.3 mm and an elevated convex spire with slightly inflated, regularly growing whorls, averaging 4.5 in number.

== Distribution ==
Specimens were recovered from water at depths between 500 and 1500 metres in a small rectangle on the southeastern flank of the Rockall Bank in the North Atlantic Ocean.
