= Wanganella ruedai =

Scientific classification
- Kingdom: Animalia
- Phylum: Mollusca
- Class: Gastropoda
- Subclass: Vetigastropoda
- Family: incertae sedis
- Genus: Wanganella
- Species: W. ruedai

Binomial name
- Wanganella ruedai Rolan & Gubbioli, 2000

Species of gastropod

Wanganella ruedai is a species of sea snail, a marine gastropod mollusk, unassigned in the superfamily Seguenzioidea.

== Distribution ==
This species occurs in the Atlantic Ocean off Mauritania.
