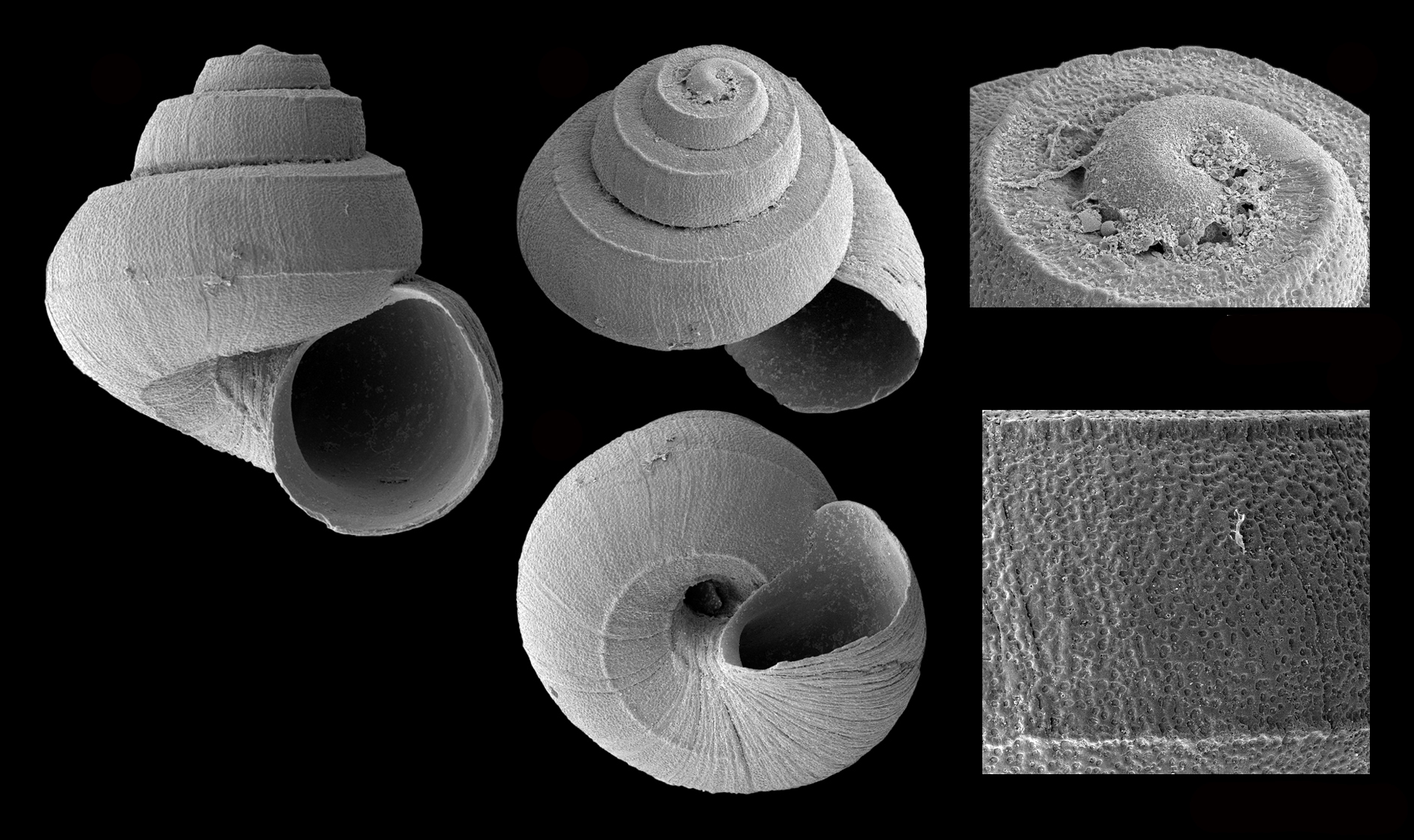
- Shell of Mikro perforatus (holotype at MNHN, Paris)

Scientific classification
- Kingdom: Animalia
- Phylum: Mollusca
- Class: Gastropoda
- Subclass: Vetigastropoda
- Order: Trochida
- Superfamily: Trochoidea
- Family: Skeneidae
- Genus: Mikro; Waren, 1996

Type species
- Mikro globulus Warén, A., 1996

= Mikro (gastropod) =

Genus of gastropods

Mikro is a genus of sea snails, marine gastropod mollusks in the family Skeneidae.

== Species ==
Species within the genus Mikro include:

- Mikro cerion (Dall, 1927)
- Mikro giustii (Bogi & Nofroni, 1989)
- Mikro globulus Warén, 1996
- Mikro hattonensis Hoffman, Van Heugten & Lavaleye, 2010
- Mikro minimus (Seguenza G., 1876)
- Mikro oviceps Ortega & Gofas, 2019
- Mikro perforatus Hoffman, Gofas & Freiwald, 2020
- Mikro scalaroides (Rubio & Rolán, 2013)

Species brought into synonymy

- Mikro minima (Seguenza G., 1876): synonym of Mikro minimus (Seguenza G., 1876) (wrong gender agreement of specific epithet)
- Mikro perforata Hoffman, Gofas & Freiwald, 2020: synonym of Mikro perforatus Hoffman, Gofas & Freiwald, 2020 (wrong gender agreement of specific epithet)
