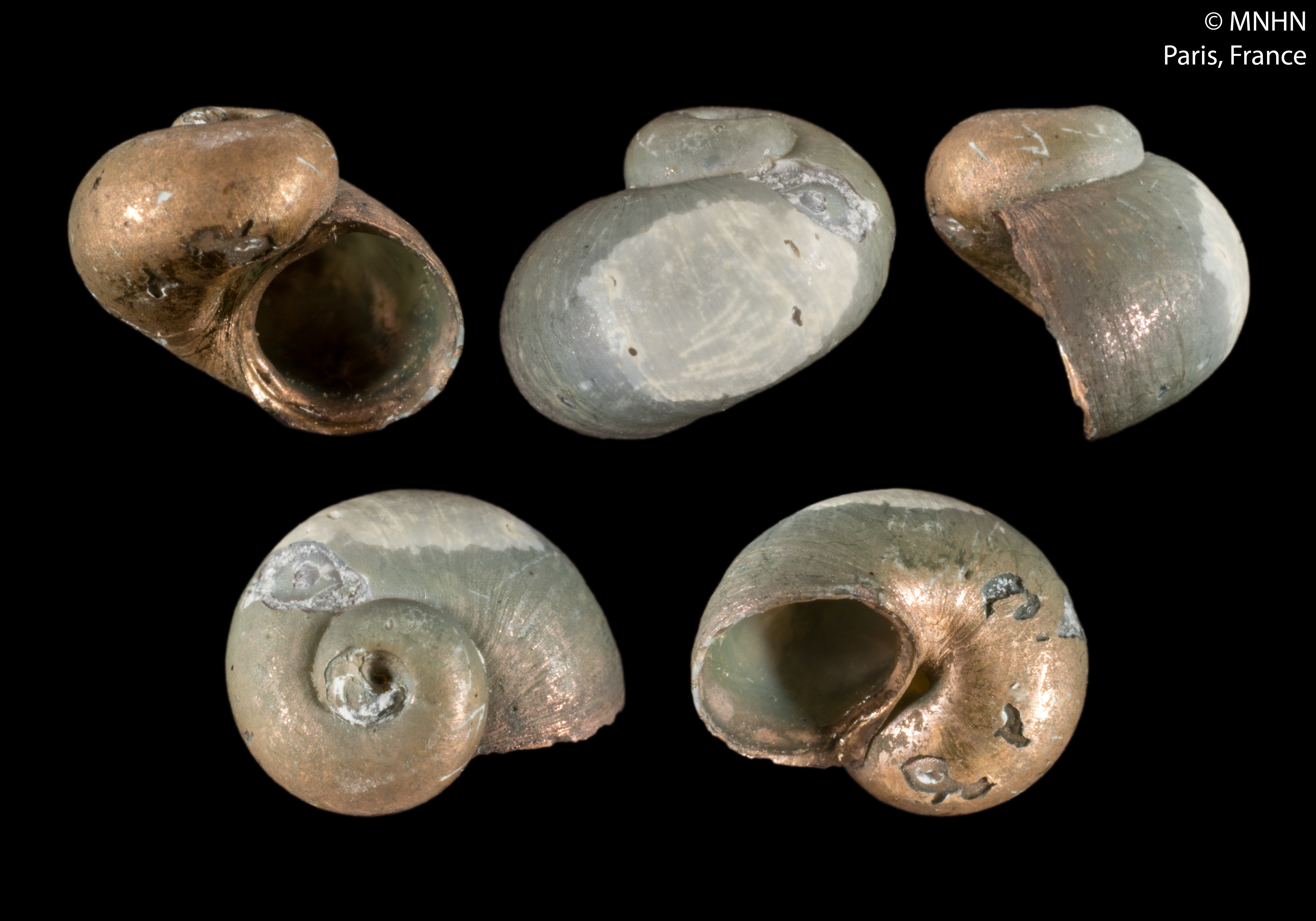
- Shell of Fucaria mystax

Scientific classification
- Kingdom: Animalia
- Phylum: Mollusca
- Class: Gastropoda
- Subclass: Vetigastropoda
- Order: Trochida
- Superfamily: Trochoidea
- Family: Skeneidae
- Genus: Fucaria; Warén & Bouchet, 1993

Type species
- Fucaria striata Warén & Bouchet, 1993

= Fucaria =

Genus of gastropods

Fucaria is a genus of sea snails, marine gastropod mollusks in the family Skeneidae.

== Species ==
Species within the genus Fucaria include:

- Fucaria mystax Warén & Bouchet, 2001
- Fucaria striata Warén & Bouchet, 1993
