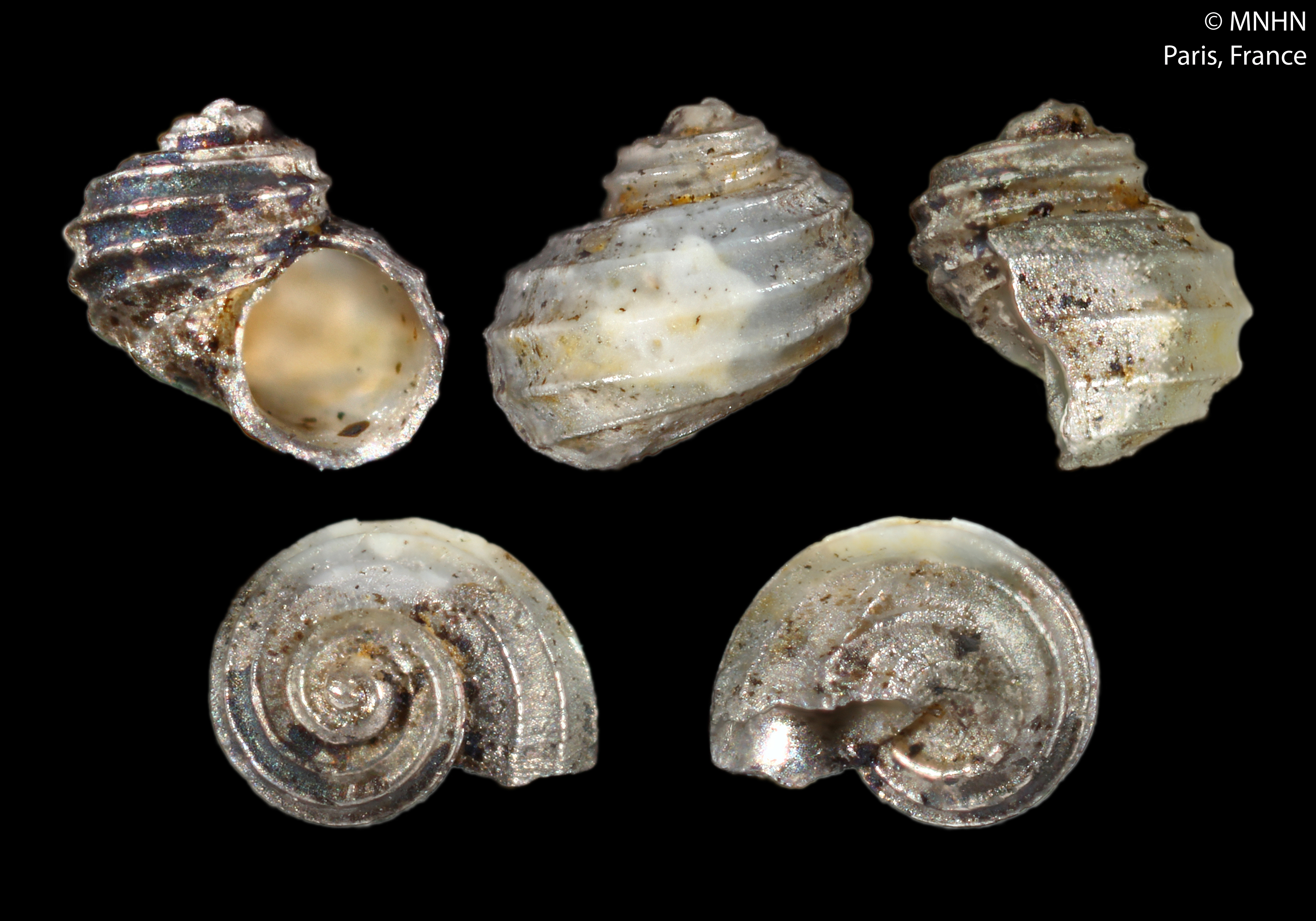
- Shell of † Pseudorbis carinifera (holotype at MNHN, Paris)

Scientific classification
- Kingdom: Animalia
- Phylum: Mollusca
- Class: Gastropoda
- Subclass: Vetigastropoda
- Order: Trochida
- Family: Skeneidae
- Genus: Pseudorbis; Monterosato, 1884

Type species
- Fossarus granulum Brugnone, 1873

= Pseudorbis =

Genus of gastropods

Pseudorbis is a genus of sea snails, marine gastropod mollusks in the family Skeneidae.

== Species ==
Species within the genus Pseudorbis include:

- † Pseudorbis carinifera Lozouet, 1999
- † Pseudorbis falunica Lozouet, 1999
- Pseudorbis granulum (Brugnone, 1873)
- Pseudorbis jameoensis (Rubio & Rodriguez Babio, 1991)
