= Wanganella lata =

Scientific classification
- Kingdom: Animalia
- Phylum: Mollusca
- Class: Gastropoda
- Subclass: Vetigastropoda
- Family: incertae sedis
- Genus: Wanganella
- Species: W. lata

Binomial name
- Wanganella lata (Laseron, 1954)

Synonyms
- Cirsonella lata (Laseron, 1954); Conicella lata Laseron, 1954

Species of gastropod

Wanganella lata is a species of sea snail, a marine gastropod mollusc, unassigned in the superfamily Seguenzioidea.

== Distribution ==
This marine species is endemic to Australia and occurs off New South Wales.
