= Wanganella (gastropod) =

Scientific classification
- Kingdom: Animalia
- Phylum: Mollusca
- Class: Gastropoda
- Subclass: Vetigastropoda
- Family: incertae sedis
- Genus: Wanganella; Laseron, 1954

Type species
- Wanganella fissura Laseron, 1954

Synonyms
- Conicella Laseron, 1954

Genus of gastropods

Wanganella is a genus of sea snails, marine gastropod mollusks, unassigned in the superfamily Seguenzioidea.

== Species ==
Species within the genus Wanganella include:

- Wanganella lata (Laseron, 1954)
- Wanganella porcellana (Tate & May, 1900)
- Wanganella ruedai Rolan & Gubbioli, 2000

Species brought into synonymy

- Wanganella fissura Laseron, 1954: synonym of Wanganella porcellana (Tate & May, 1900)
