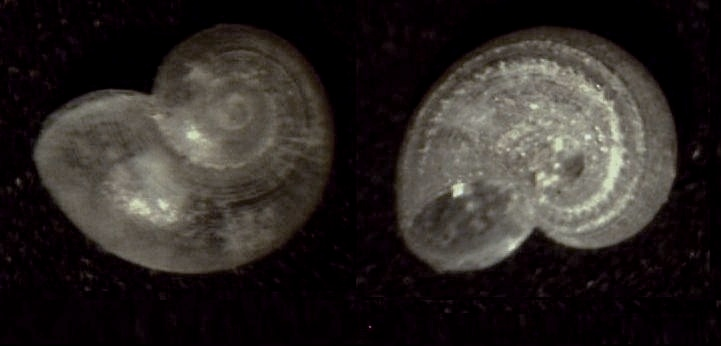
- Two views of a shell of Skenea catenoides

Scientific classification
- Kingdom: Animalia
- Phylum: Mollusca
- Class: Gastropoda
- Subclass: Vetigastropoda
- Order: Trochida
- Superfamily: Trochoidea
- Family: Skeneidae; W. Clark, 1851

Type genus
- Skenea Fleming, 1824<

Genera
- See text

Synonyms
- Skeneinae W. Clark, 1851

= Skeneidae =

Family of gastropods

The Skeneidae are a speciose family of minute to small marine gastropod molluscs in the superfamily Trochoidea.

The former subfamily Skeneinae (in the family Turbinidae) was loosely defined. Information on the specific characters of this family are incompletely described. Recent molecular evidence suggests that a number of these genera in Skeneinae probably belong to other families altogether, so many of these assignments must be regarded as provisional. Williams noted in 2012 that "this group is in a desperate need of revision". The subfamily Skeneinae has been upgraded to the status of family Skeneidae, comprising most genera formerly in the subfamily Skeneinae. But even then, the family Skeneidae represents a polyphyletic, “skeneimorph” assemblage. It should be pruned of many genera which would go to the superfamily Seguenzioidea according to Kano (2008) Until a researcher formally assigns them to a seguenzioid family in the literature, the database WoRMS prefers to keep them unchanged.

This family is assemblage of small to very small shells that lack a nacreous structure. The shells are white and show no color patterns.

== Genera ==
- Bruceiella Warén & Bouchet, 1993
- Callodix Laseron, 1954
- Callomphala A. Adams & Angas, 1864
- Cirsonella Angas, 1877 - synonym: Tharsiella Bush, 1897
- Dasyskenea Fasulo & Cretella, 2003
- Didianema Woodring, 1928
- Dikoleps Hoisaeter, 1968
- Dillwynella Dall, 1889
- Fucaria Warén & Bouchet, 1993
- Ganesa Jeffreys, 1883
- Haplocochlias Carpenter, 1864
- Iheyaspira Okutani, Sasaki & Tsuchida, 2000
- Leucorhynchia Crosse, 1867
- Liocarinia Laseron, 1954
- Liotella Iredale, 1915
- Lissomphalia Warén, 1992
- Lissospira Bush, 1897
- Lodderena Iredale, 1924
- Lodderia Tate, 1899
- Lopheliella Hoffman, van Heugten & Lavaleye, 2008
- Lophocochlias Pilsbry, 1921
- Mikro Warén, 1996
- Munditiella Kuroda & Habe, 1954
- Parisanda Laseron, 1954
- Partubiola Iredale, 1936
- Parviturbo Pilsbry & McGinty, 1945
- Philorene Oliver, 1915
- Pondorbis Bartsch, 1915
- Protolira Warén & Bouchet, 1993
- Pseudoliotina Cossmann, 1925
- Pseudorbis Monterosato, 1884
- Rotostoma Laseron, 1954
- Seamountiella Rubio, Gofas & Rolán, 2019
- Skenea Fleming, 1825 - type genus
- Skeneoides Warén, 1992
- † Spinobrookula Lozouet & Maestrati, 1982
- Tasmocrossea Dell, 1952
- Tholostoma Laseron, 1958
- Zalipais Iredale, 1915

Genera moved to other families

- Bathyxylophila B. A. Marshall, 1988: moved to family Larocheidae Finlay, 1927
- Conradia A. Adams, 1860: moved to the family Crosseolidae Hickman, 2013
- Crossea A. Adams, 1865: moved to the family Crosseolidae Hickman, 2013
- Crosseola Iredale, 1924: moved to the family Crosseolidae Hickman, 2013

Genera brought into synonymy

- Chunula Thiele, 1925: synonym of Granigyra Dall, 1889
- Crosseia P. Fischer, 1885: synonym of Crossea A. Adams, 1865
- Gottoina A. Adams, 1863: synonym of Conradia A. Adams, 1860
- Helisalia Laseron, 1954: synonym of Omalogyra Jeffreys, 1859
- Lapidicola Egorova, 1972: synonym of Lissotesta Iredale, 1915
- Porcupinia Cossmann, 1900: synonym of Cirsonella Angas, 1877
- Skeneia [sic]: synonym of Skenea Fleming, 1825
- Tharsiella Bush, 1897: synonym of Cirsonella Angas, 1877
- Tharsis Jeffreys, 1883:synonym of Cirsonella Angas, 1877
