= Vanikoro gueriniana =

Scientific classification
- Kingdom: Animalia
- Phylum: Mollusca
- Class: Gastropoda
- Subclass: Caenogastropoda
- Order: Littorinimorpha
- Family: Vanikoridae
- Genus: Vanikoro
- Species: V. gueriniana

Binomial name
- Vanikoro gueriniana (Récluz, 1845)

Synonyms
- Narica distans Récluz, 1844 (original combination); Narica gueriniana Récluz, 1844 (original combination); Vanikoro distans (Récluz, 1844)

Species of gastropod

Vanikoro gueriniana is a species of very small sea snail, a marine gastropod mollusk in the family Vanikoridae.

== Description ==
The length of the shell varies between 9 mm and 12.5 mm.

(Original description in Latin) The shell is orbicular-ovate, flattened, somewhat cone-shaped, flat underneath and thick It is yellowish-white, and has oblique ribs. The ribs are rounded with larger grooves, sometimes equal. It is elegantly encircled by very frequent transverse lines. The spire is semi-globose and somewhat blunt. The aperture is semi-lunar and open. The umbilicus is widened on the outside, and expanded into a wide, semi-spherical channel that is angled on the outside. The columella is straight, and has an indistinct channel above it. The outer lip is thick, rounded, somewhat sharp, and its inner margin is indistinctly striated.

== Distribution ==
This marine species occurs in the Red Sea and in the Mascarene Basin; also off the Philippines and the Marshall Islands.
