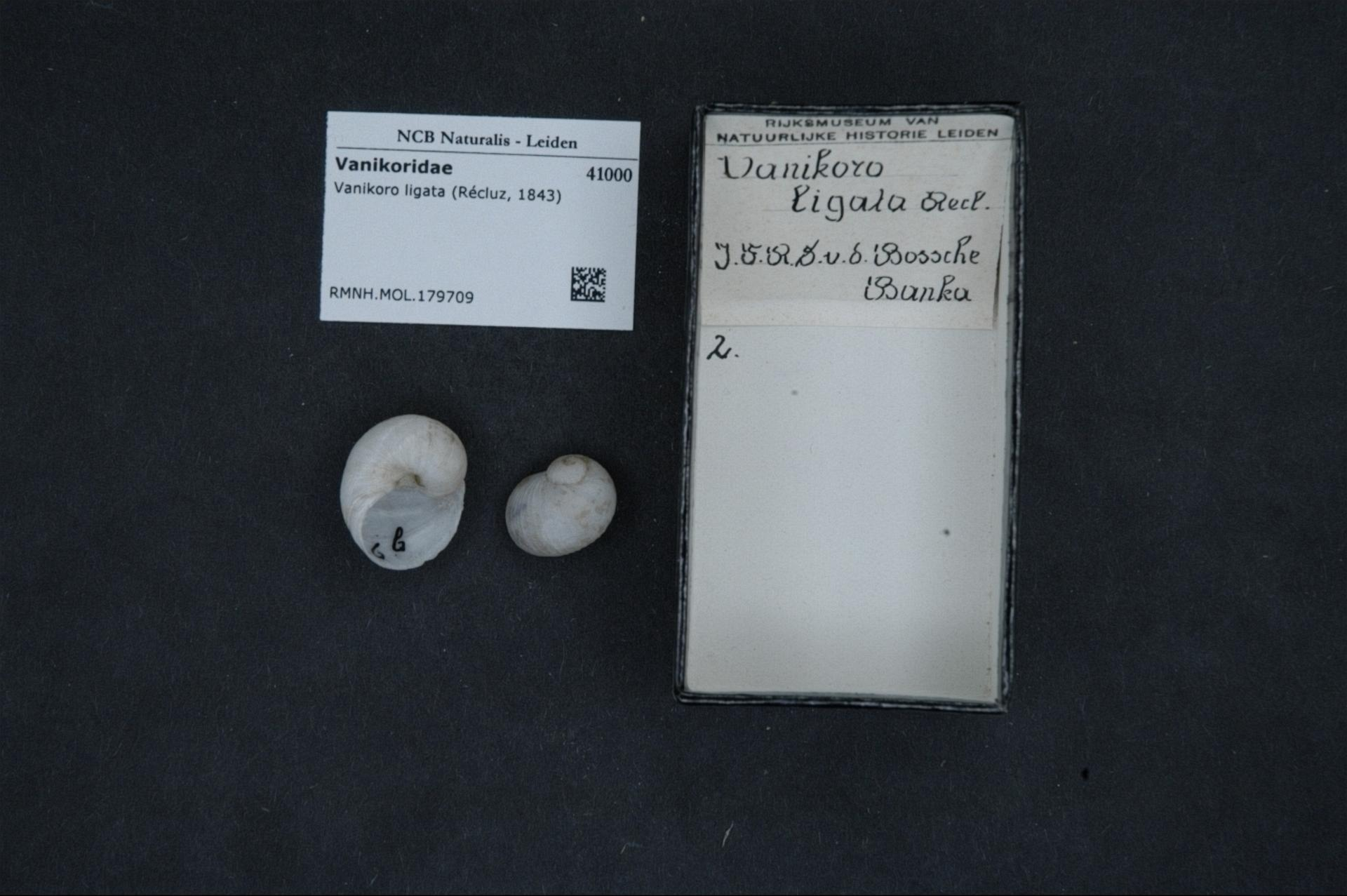

Scientific classification
- Kingdom: Animalia
- Phylum: Mollusca
- Class: Gastropoda
- Subclass: Caenogastropoda
- Order: Littorinimorpha
- Family: Vanikoridae
- Genus: Vanikoro
- Species: V. ligata

Binomial name
- Vanikoro ligata (Récluz, 1843)

Synonyms
- Vanikoro deshayesiana (Récluz, 1844)

= Vanikoro ligata =

Species of gastropod

Vanikoro ligata is a species of very small sea snail, a marine gastropod mollusk in the family Vanikoridae.

== Distribution ==
This species occurs in the Indian Ocean off Aldabra and the Mascarene Basin.
