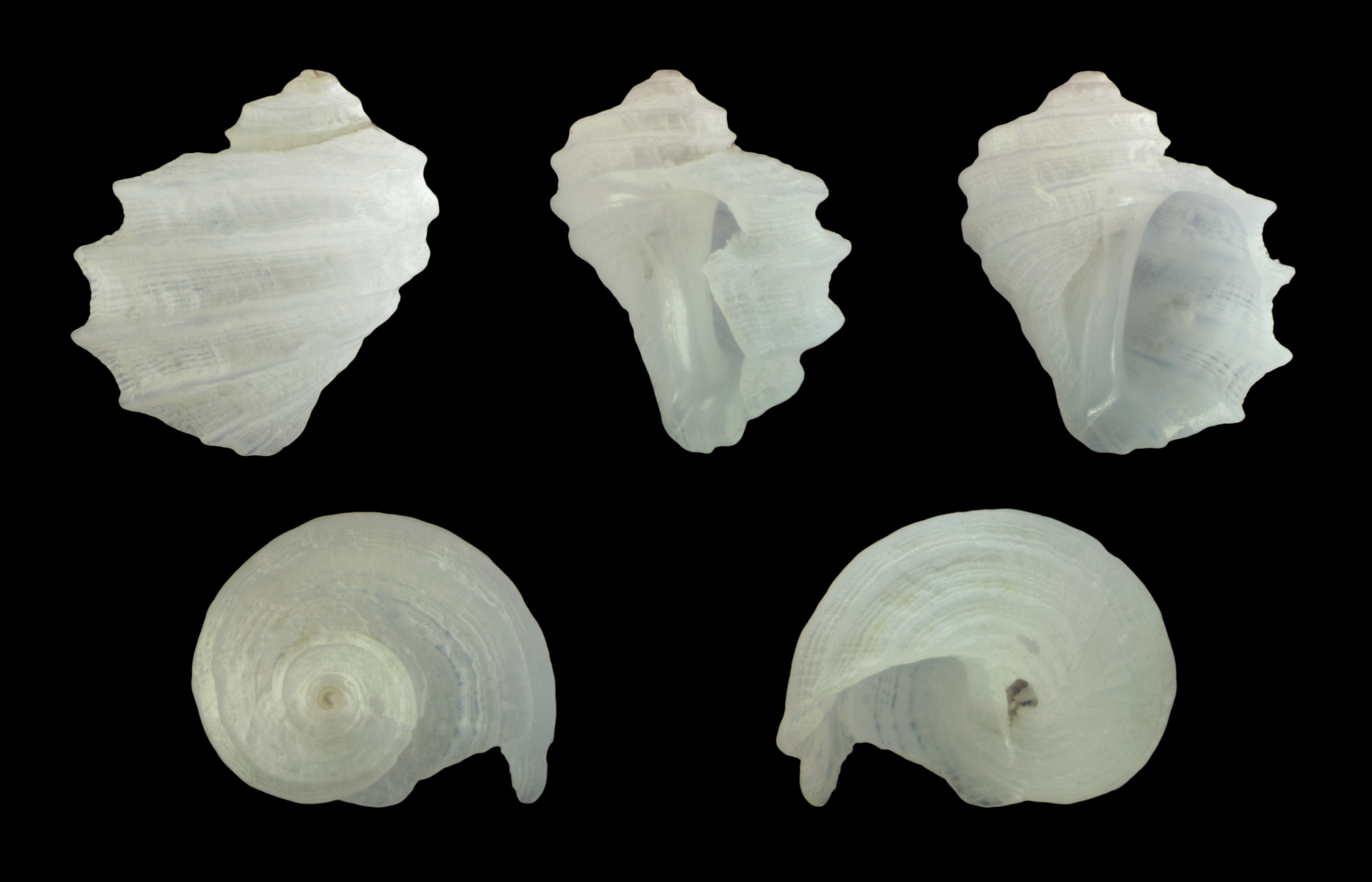
- Fossarus ambiguus

Scientific classification
- Kingdom: Animalia
- Phylum: Mollusca
- Class: Gastropoda
- Subclass: Caenogastropoda
- Order: incertae sedis
- Family: Planaxidae
- Subfamily: Fossarinae
- Genus: Fossarus; Philippi, 1841

Type species
- Fossarus adansoni Philippi, 1841

Synonyms
- Fossar Gray, 1847 (invalid: unjustified emendation of Fossarus); Maravignia Aradas & Maggiore, 1844

= Fossarus =

Genus of gastropods

Fossarus is a genus of sea snails, marine gastropod mollusks in the family Planaxidae.

== Species ==
Species within the genus Fossarus include:

- Fossarus abjectus (C.B. Adams, 1852)
- Fossarus ambiguus (Linnaeus, 1758)
- Fossarus angiostoma (C.B. Adams, 1852)
- Fossarus angulatus Carpenter, 1857
- Fossarus atratus (C.B. Adams, 1852)
- Fossarus beccarii (Tapparone Canefri, 1875)
- Fossarus bellus Dall, 1889
- Fossarus brumalis Hedley, 1907
- Fossarus cancellarius Melvill, 1918
- Fossarus capensis Pilsbry, 1901
- Fossarus cereus Watson, 1880
- Fossarus cumingii (A. Adams, 1855)
- Fossarus dentifer E. A. Smith, 1890
- Fossarus elegans Verrill & Smith, 1882
- Fossarus erythraeensis: taxon inquirendum
- Fossarus eutorniscus Melvill, 1918
- Fossarus excavatus (C.B. Adams, 1852)
- Fossarus fischeri Mörch, 1877
- Fossarus foveatus (C.B. Adams, 1852)
- Fossarus garrettii Pease, 1868
- Fossarus guayaquilensis Bartsch, 1928
- Fossarus japonicus (A. Adams, 1861)
- Fossarus laeviusculus E. A. Smith, 1890
- Fossarus lamellosus Mountrouzier, 1861
- Fossarus lucanus Dall, 1919
- Fossarus lui S.-I Huang, 2012
- Fossarus macmurdensis (Hedley, 1911)
- Fossarus mediocris de Folin, 1867
- Fossarus megasoma (C.B. Adams, 1852)
- Fossarus orbignyi P. Fischer, 1864
- Fossarus porcatus (Philippi, 1845)
- Fossarus purus Carpenter, 1864
- Fossarus sydneyensis Hedley, 1900
- Fossarus tornatilis (Gould, 1859)
- Fossarus translucens Barnard, 1969
- Fossarus trochlearis A. Adams, 1853
- Fossarus tuberosus Carpenter, 1857

Species brought into synonymy

- Fossarus adansoni Philippi, 1841: synonym of Fossarus ambiguus (Linnaeus, 1758)
- Fossarus aptus Melvill, 1912: synonym of Fossarus ambiguus (Linnaeus, 1758)
- Fossarus bulimoides Tenison Woods, 1877: synonym of Leucotina casta (A. Adams, 1853)
- Fossarus clathratus Philippi, 1844: synonym of Clathrella clathrata (Philippi, 1844)
- Fossarus (Gottoina) compacta Dall, 1889: synonym of Haplocochlias compactus (Dall, 1889)
- Fossarus depressus Seguenza, 1876: synonym of Megalomphalus disciformis (Granata-Grillo, 1877)
- Fossarus disciformis Granata-Grillo, 1877: synonym of Megalomphalus disciformis (Granata-Grillo, 1877)
- Fossarius doliaris A. Adams, 1863: synonym of Conradia doliaris A. Adams, 1863
- Fossarus excavatus Gaglini, 1987: synonym of Rugulina monterosatoi (van Aartsen & Bogi, 1987)
- Fossarus globulosus Turton, 1932: synonym of Couthouyia incerta (Turton, 1932)
- Fossarus granulum Brugnone, 1873: synonym of Pseudorbis granulum (Brugnone, 1873)
- Fossarus hyalinus Odhner, 1924: synonym of Scrupus hyalinus (Odhner, 1924)
- Fossarus incertus Turton, 1932: synonym of Couthouyia incerta (Turton, 1932)
- Fossarus iwateanus Nomura & Hatai, 1935: synonym of Phasianema lirata (A. Adams, 1860)
- Fossarus lanoei Baudon, 1857: synonym of Fossarus ambiguus (Linnaeus, 1758)
- Fossarus monterosati Granata-Grillo, 1877: synonym of Tjaernoeia exquisita (Jeffreys, 1883)
- Fossarus parcipictus Carpenter, 1864: synonym of Echinolittorina parcipicta (Carpenter, 1864)
- Fossarus petitianus Tiberi, 1869: synonym of Megalomphalus petitianus (Tiberi, 1869)
- Fossarus saxicola (C.B. Adams, 1852): synonym of Elachisina saxicola (C. B. Adams, 1852)
- Fossarus yamamotoi Habe, 1978: synonym of Macromphalus yamamotoi (Habe, 1978)
