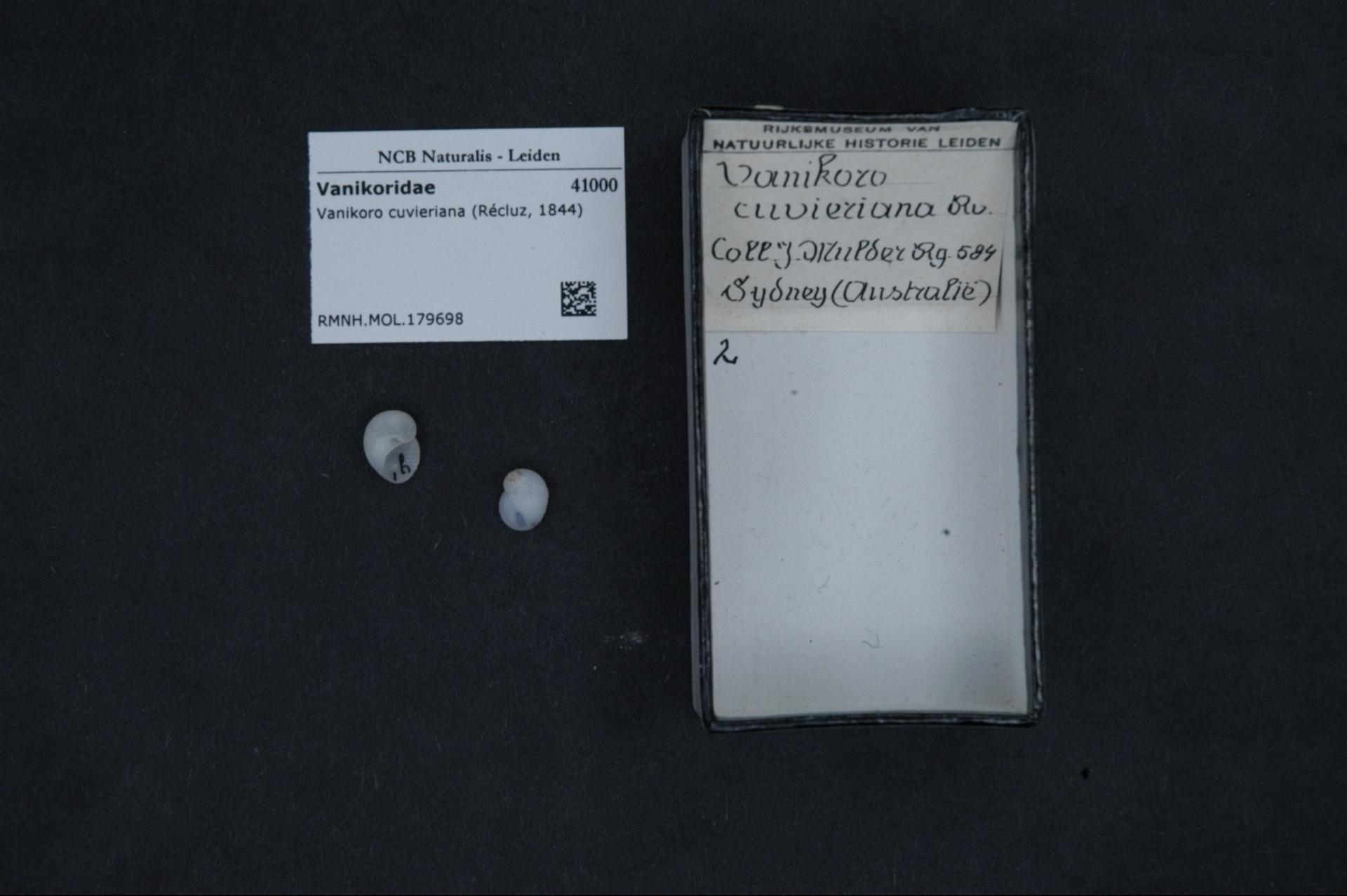

Scientific classification
- Kingdom: Animalia
- Phylum: Mollusca
- Class: Gastropoda
- Subclass: Caenogastropoda
- Order: Littorinimorpha
- Family: Vanikoridae
- Genus: Vanikoro
- Species: V. cuvieriana

Binomial name
- Vanikoro cuvieriana (Recluz, 1845)

Synonyms
- Sigaretus cuvierianus Recluz, 1844 (basionym); Vanikoro rosea Recluz, 1845

= Vanikoro cuvieriana =

Species of gastropod

Vanikoro cuvieriana is a species of very small sea snail, a marine gastropod mollusk in the family Vanikoridae.

== Description ==
The size of an adult shell varies between 2.5 mm and 10 mm.

== Distribution ==
This marine species is distributed in the Indian Ocean along the Mascarene Basin and in the Central Pacific Ocean.
