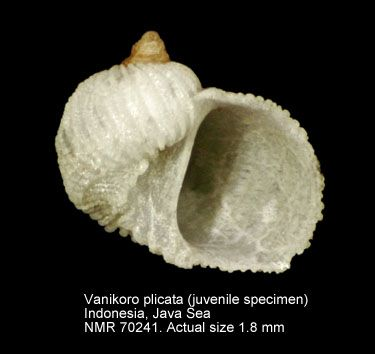
- Vanikoro plicata

Scientific classification
- Kingdom: Animalia
- Phylum: Mollusca
- Class: Gastropoda
- Subclass: Caenogastropoda
- Order: Littorinimorpha
- Family: Vanikoridae
- Genus: Vanikoro
- Species: V. plicata

Binomial name
- Vanikoro plicata (Récluz, 1844)

= Vanikoro plicata =

Species of gastropod

Vanikoro plicata is a species of very small sea snail, a marine gastropod mollusk in the family Vanikoridae.

== Description ==
It has a strongly ribbed surface, up to 2 centimeters wide. It lives under stones in the lower eulittoral and the sublittoral regions of the ocean.

== Distribution ==
It has been documented in Okinawa Island and the Mascarene Basin of the Indian Ocean. It has also been documented in the Northern Red Sea near Egypt. In addition, it was recorded off the coast of the island nation of Mauritius.
