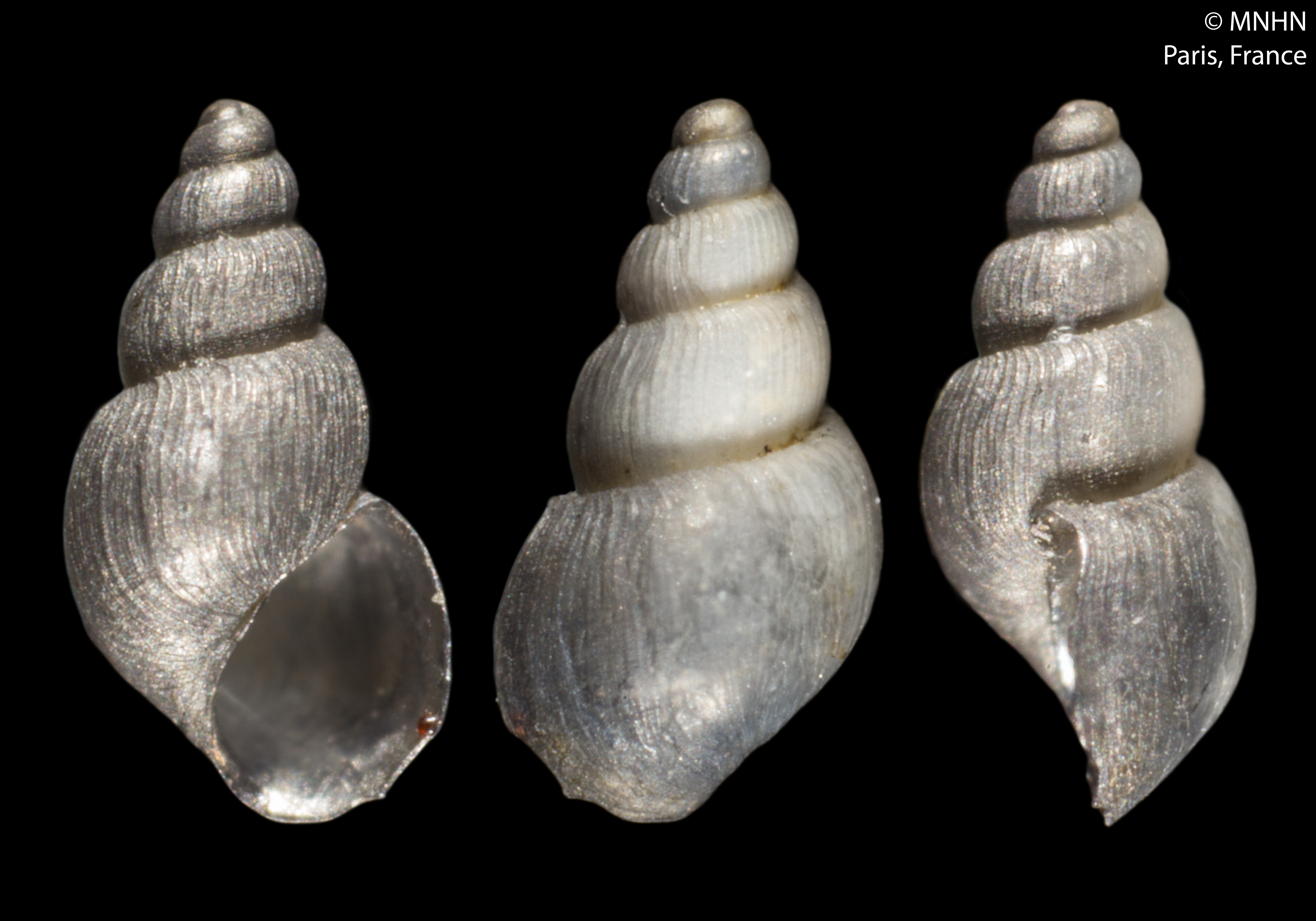
- Shell of Talassia dagueneti (syntype at MNHN, Paris)

Scientific classification
- Kingdom: Animalia
- Phylum: Mollusca
- Class: Gastropoda
- Subclass: Caenogastropoda
- Order: Littorinimorpha
- Family: Vanikoridae
- Genus: Talassia
- Species: T. dagueneti

Binomial name
- Talassia dagueneti (de Folin, 1873)

Synonyms
- Auriconoba continentalis F. Nordsieck, 1974; Salassia dagueneti de Folin, 1873; Salassia venusta de Folin, 1887 (dubious synonym)

= Talassia dagueneti =

Species of gastropod

Talassia dagueneti is a species of very small sea snail, a marine gastropod mollusk in the family Vanikoridae.

== Description ==
The length of the shell attains 2 mm.

== Distribution ==
This marine species was found in the fosse du Cap Breton, Bay of Biscay.
