= Larsenia scalaroides =

Scientific classification
- Kingdom: Animalia
- Phylum: Mollusca
- Class: Gastropoda
- Subclass: Caenogastropoda
- Order: Littorinimorpha
- Family: Vanikoridae
- Genus: Larsenia
- Species: L. scalaroides

Binomial name
- Larsenia scalaroides Warén, 1989

Species of gastropod

Larsenia scalaroides is a species of extremely small sea snail, a marine gastropod mollusk or micromollusk in the family Vanikoridae.

== Description ==
The maximum recorded shell length is 1.9 mm.

== Habitat ==
The minimum recorded depth is 156 m; the maximum recorded depth is 900 m.
