= Macromphalina apexplanum =

Scientific classification
- Kingdom: Animalia
- Phylum: Mollusca
- Class: Gastropoda
- Subclass: Caenogastropoda
- Order: Littorinimorpha
- Family: Vanikoridae
- Genus: Macromphalina
- Species: M. apexplanum

Binomial name
- Macromphalina apexplanum Rolan & Rubio, 1998

Species of gastropod

Macromphalina apexplanum is a species of very small sea snail, a marine gastropod mollusk in the family Vanikoridae.

== Distribution ==
The organism is distributed across the Western Atlantic and can be found in Panama, Colombia, Antigua; and Trinidad & Tobago.

== Description ==
The maximum recorded shell length is 1.5 mm (0.059 in).

== Habitat ==
The minimum recorded depth is 10 m (33 ft); the maximum recorded depth is 25 m (82 ft).
