= Zeradina esculenta =

Scientific classification
- Kingdom: Animalia
- Phylum: Mollusca
- Class: Gastropoda
- Subclass: Caenogastropoda
- Order: Littorinimorpha
- Superfamily: Vanikoroidea
- Family: Vanikoridae
- Genus: Zeradina
- Species: †Z. esculenta

Binomial name
- †Zeradina esculenta Laws, 1944

Synonyms
- † Micreschara esculenta (Laws, 1944); † Zeradina (Naridista) esculenta Laws, 1944

Species of gastropod

Zeradina esculenta is an extinct species of sea snail, a marine gastropod mollusk in the family Vanikoridae.

== Distribution ==
Fossils of this marine species were found in Tertiary strata at Kaipara, New Zealand.
