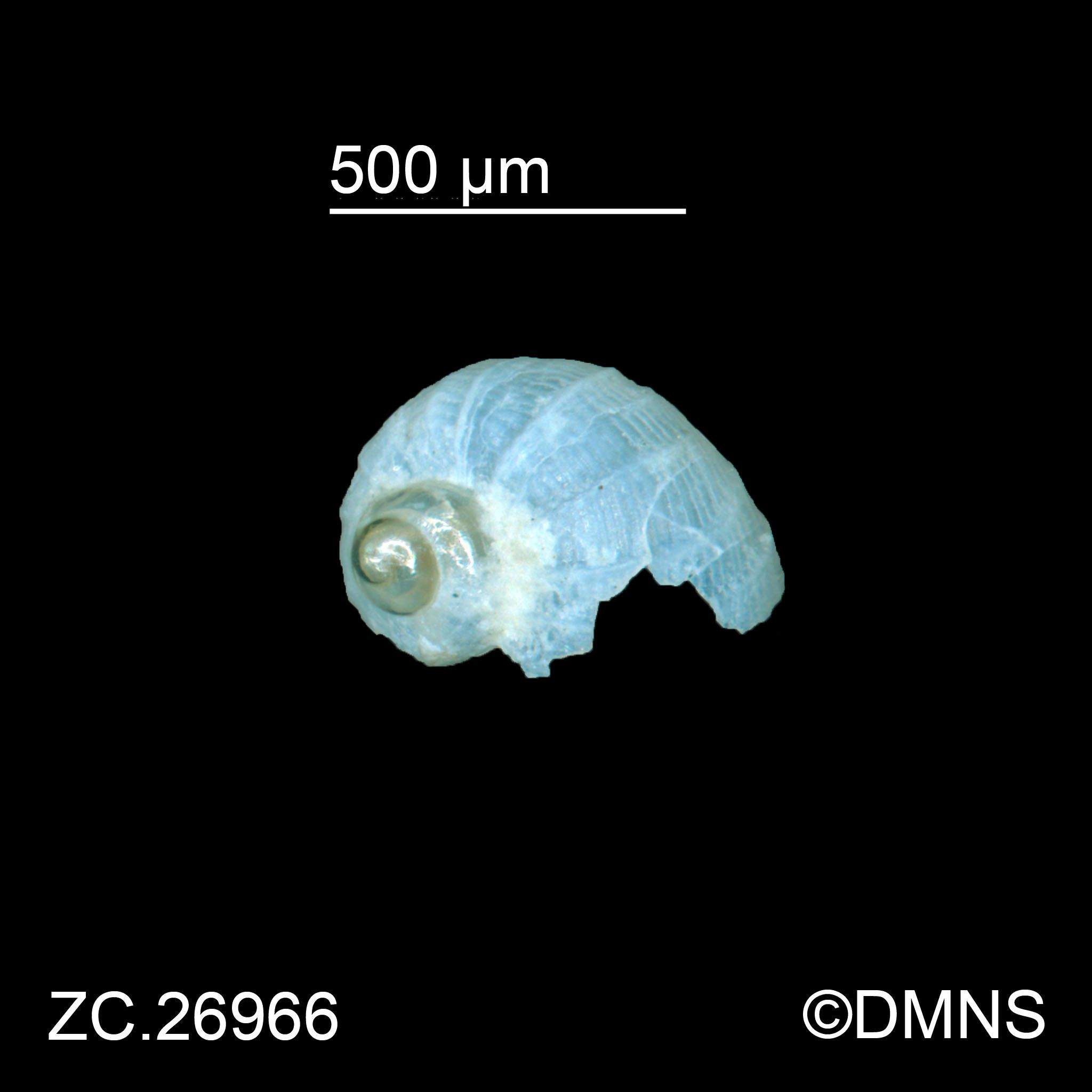

Scientific classification
- Kingdom: Animalia
- Phylum: Mollusca
- Class: Gastropoda
- Subclass: Caenogastropoda
- Order: Littorinimorpha
- Family: Vanikoridae
- Genus: Macromphalina
- Species: M. palmalitoris

Binomial name
- Macromphalina palmalitoris Pilsbry & McGinty, 1950

= Macromphalina palmalitoris =

Species of gastropod

Macromphalina palmalitoris is a species of very small sea snail, a marine gastropod mollusk in the family Vanikoridae.

== Description ==
The maximum recorded shell length is 2.9 mm.

== Habitat ==
The minimum recorded depth for this species is 11 m; maximum recorded depth is 161 m.
