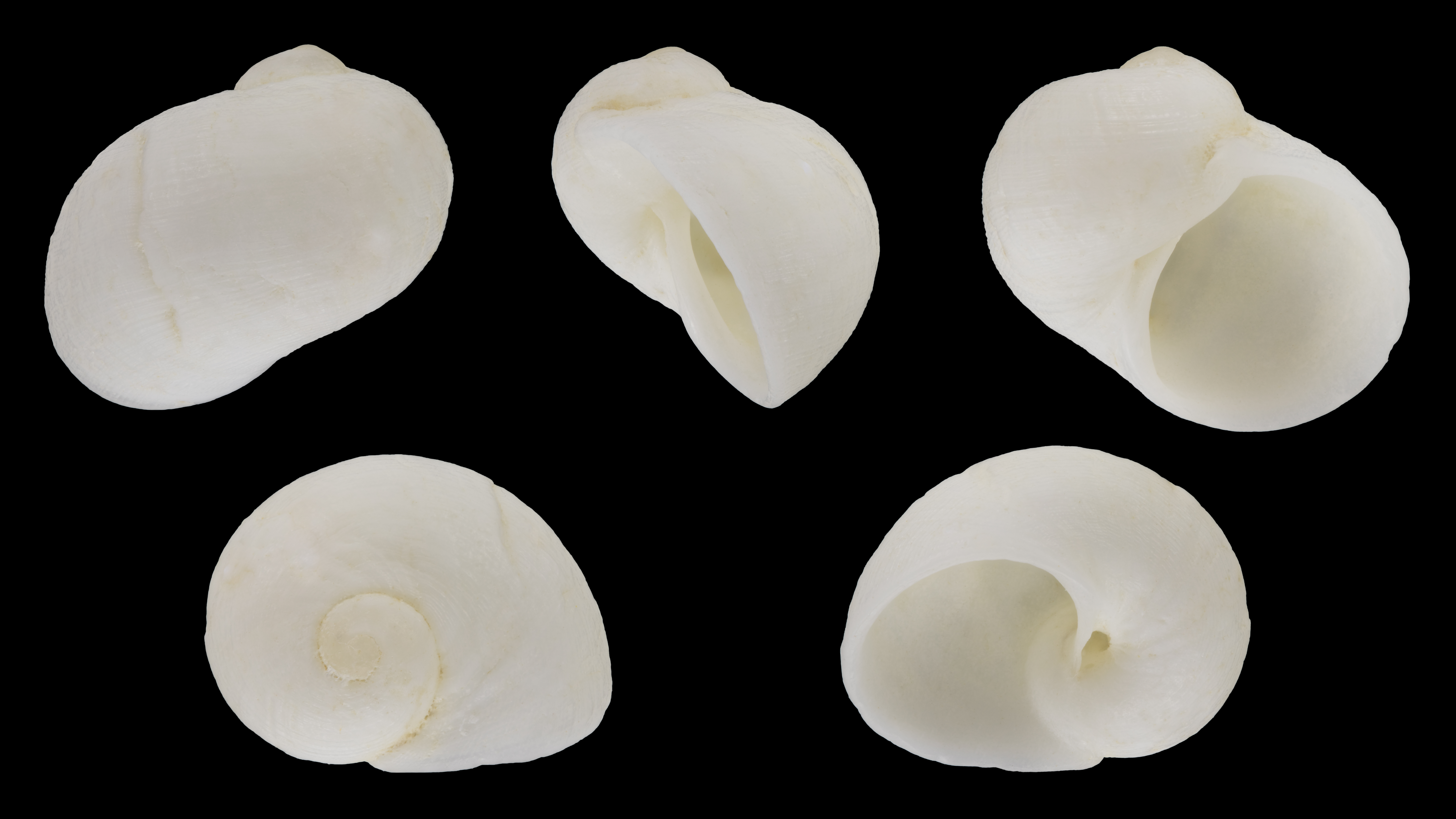

Scientific classification
- Kingdom: Animalia
- Phylum: Mollusca
- Class: Gastropoda
- Subclass: Caenogastropoda
- Order: Littorinimorpha
- Family: Vanikoridae
- Genus: Vanikoro
- Species: V. cancellata

Binomial name
- Vanikoro cancellata (Lamarck, 1822)

= Vanikoro cancellata =

Species of gastropod

Vanikoro cancellata is a species of very small sea snail, a marine gastropod mollusk in the family Vanikoridae.

== Distribution ==
- Aldabra
- Chagos
- Mozambique
- Tanzania
