= Talassia sandersoni =

Scientific classification
- Kingdom: Animalia
- Phylum: Mollusca
- Class: Gastropoda
- Subclass: Caenogastropoda
- Order: Littorinimorpha
- Family: Vanikoridae
- Genus: Talassia
- Species: T. sandersoni

Binomial name
- Talassia sandersoni (A. E. Verrill, 1884)

Synonyms
- Alvania sandersoni (A. E. Verrill, 1884)

Species of gastropod

Talassia sandersoni is a species of very small sea snail, a marine gastropod mollusk in the family Vanikoridae.

== Description ==
The maximum recorded shell length is 4 mm.

== Habitat ==
Minimum recorded depth is 260 m. Maximum recorded depth is 260 m.
