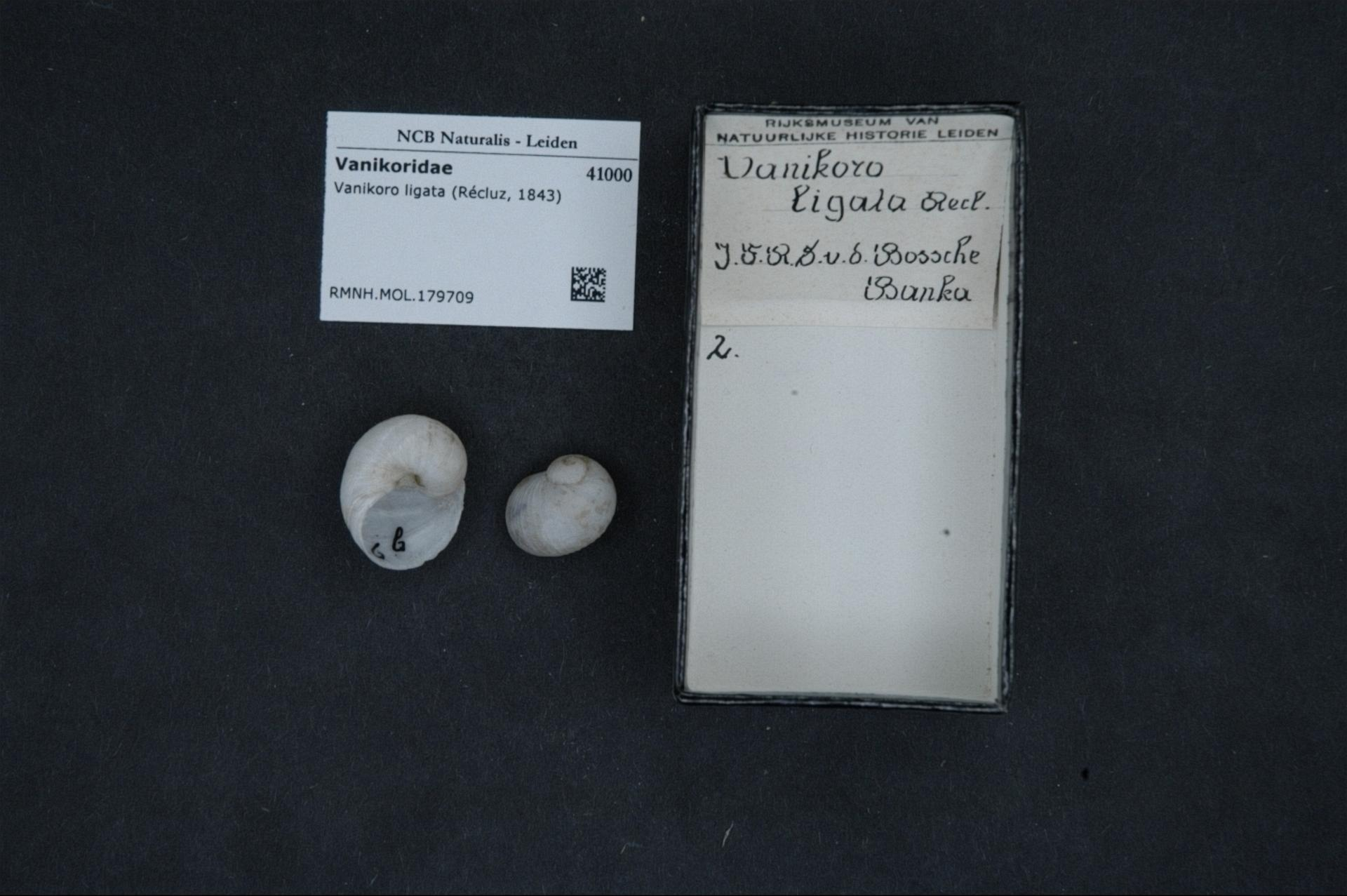
- Vanikoro ligata

Scientific classification
- Kingdom: Animalia
- Phylum: Mollusca
- Class: Gastropoda
- Subclass: Caenogastropoda
- Order: Littorinimorpha
- Family: Vanikoridae
- Genus: Vanikoro; Quoy & Gaimard, 1832

Type species
- Vanikoro cancellata Lamarck, 1822

Synonyms
- Korovina Iredale, 1918; Leucotis Swainson, 1840 (junior objective synonym of Vanikoro); Merria Gray, 1839; Narica d'Orbigny, 1842

= Vanikoro (gastropod) =

Genus of gastropods

Vanikoro is a genus of very small sea snails, marine gastropod mollusks in the family Vanikoridae.

== Distribution ==
This species occurs in the Indian Ocean off Mauritius.

== Species ==
Species within the genus Vanikoro include:

- † Vanikoro accelerans (Marwick, 1928)
- Vanikoro aperta (Carpenter, 1864)
- Vanikoro cancellata (Lamarck, 1822)
- Vanikoro clathrata (Récluz, 1845)
- Vanikoro cumingiana (Récluz, 1844)
- Vanikoro cuvieriana (Récluz, 1845)
- Vanikoro dupliangulata (Laws, 1940) †
- Vanikoro fenestrata (A. Adams, 1863)
- Vanikoro foveolata Souverbie & Montrouzier, 1866
- Vanikoro gaimardi A. Adams, 1854
- Vanikoro galapagana Hertlein & Strong, 1951
- Vanikoro granulosa Récluz, 1845
- Vanikoro gueriniana (Récluz, 1844)
- Vanikoro helicoidea (Le Guillou, 1842)
- Vanikoro kilburni Drivas, J. & M. Jay, 1989
- Vanikoro ligata (Récluz, 1843)
- Vanikoro mauritii (Récluz, 1845)
- Vanikoro natalensis E. A. Smith, 1908
- Vanikoro orbignyana (Récluz, 1844)
- Vanikoro oxychone Mörch, 1877
- Vanikoro plicata (Récluz, 1844)
- Vanikoro quoyiana A. Adams, 1854
- Vanikoro satondae Bandel & Kowalke, 1997
- Vanikoro sigaretiformis (Potiez & Michaud, 1838)
- Vanikoro striatus (d'Orbigny, 1842)
- Vanikoro sulcatus (d'Orbigny, 1842)
- Vanikoro tricarinata (Récluz, 1843)
- Vanikoro wallacei Iredale, 1912

Species brought into synonymy

- Vanikoro aenigmatica Turton, 1932: synonym of Macromphalus incertus (Turton, 1932)
- Vanikoro blainvilliana (Récluz, 1845): synonym of Vanikoro ligata (Récluz, 1844)
- Vanikoro deshayesiana ([Récluz, 1844): synonym of Vanikoro ligata (Récluz, 1844)
- Vanikoro distans (Récluz, 1845): synonym of Vanikoro gueriniana (Récluz, 1844)
- Vanikoro deshayesiana (Récluz, 1844) : synonym of Vanikoro ligata (Récluz, 1844)
- Vanikoro gracilis Brazier, 1894: synonym of Macromphalus gracilis (Brazier, 1894)
- Vanikoro japonica Pilsbry, 1895: synonym of Vanikoro fenestrata (A. Adams, 1863)
- Vanikoro recluziana A. Adams & Angas, 1864: synonym of Vanikoro sigaretiformis (Potiez & Michaud, 1838)

Taxon inquirendum

- Vanikoro semiplicata Pease, 1861

== See also ==
- Vanikoridae
- Sea snail
- Gastropod
