= F. elegans =

F. elegans may refer to:

- Festuca elegans, a grass species in the genus Festuca
- Fossarus elegans, a sea snail species

== Synonyms ==
- Fulgora elegans, a synonym for Calyptoproctus elegans, a bug in the family Fulgoridae found in Surinam, Brazil, French Guiana and Honduras
