= Constantia elegans =

Scientific classification
- Kingdom: Animalia
- Phylum: Mollusca
- Class: Gastropoda
- Subclass: Caenogastropoda
- Order: Littorinimorpha
- Family: Vanikoridae
- Genus: Constantia
- Species: C. elegans

Binomial name
- Constantia elegans A. Adams, 1860

Species of gastropod

Constantia elegans is a species of sea snails in the family Vanikoridae. It is the type species of its genus. It is found in Japan.
