= Zeradina plicifera =

Scientific classification
- Kingdom: Animalia
- Phylum: Mollusca
- Class: Gastropoda
- Subclass: Caenogastropoda
- Order: Littorinimorpha
- Superfamily: Vanikoroidea
- Family: Vanikoridae
- Genus: Zeradina
- Species: Z. plicifera

Binomial name
- Zeradina plicifera (A. Adams, 1863)

Synonyms
- Couthouyia plicifera A. Adams, 1863

Species of gastropod

Zeradina plicifera is a species of sea snail, a marine gastropod mollusk in the family Vanikoridae.

== Description ==
(Original description) This is a small species with 4½ plicate and convex whorls and a canaliculated suture. It is finely striated transversely and is very thin. The aperture is ovate. The outer lip is arcuate.

== Distribution ==
This marine species occurs off the Philippines and Japan.
