= Vanikoro kilburni =

Scientific classification
- Kingdom: Animalia
- Phylum: Mollusca
- Class: Gastropoda
- Subclass: Caenogastropoda
- Order: Littorinimorpha
- Family: Vanikoridae
- Genus: Vanikoro
- Species: V. kilburni

Binomial name
- Vanikoro kilburni Drivas, J. & M. Jay, 1989

Species of gastropod

Vanikoro kilburni is a species of very small sea snail, a marine gastropod mollusk in the family Vanikoridae.

== Distribution ==
This species occurs in the Indian Ocean in the Mascarene Basin.
