= Macromphalina dautzenbergi =

Scientific classification
- Kingdom: Animalia
- Phylum: Mollusca
- Class: Gastropoda
- Subclass: Caenogastropoda
- Order: Littorinimorpha
- Family: Vanikoridae
- Genus: Macromphalina
- Species: M. dautzenbergi

Binomial name
- Macromphalina dautzenbergi Adam & Knudsen

Species of gastropod

Macromphalina dautzenbergi is a species of very small sea snail, a marine gastropod mollusk in the family Vanikoridae.
