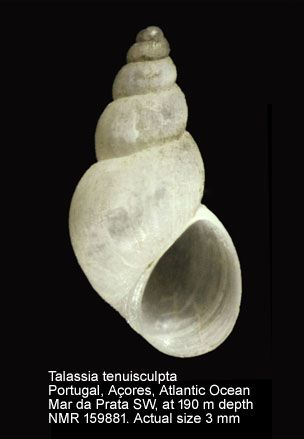

Scientific classification
- Kingdom: Animalia
- Phylum: Mollusca
- Class: Gastropoda
- Subclass: Caenogastropoda
- Order: Littorinimorpha
- Family: Vanikoridae
- Genus: Talassia
- Species: T. tenuisculpta

Binomial name
- Talassia tenuisculpta (Watson, 1873)

= Talassia tenuisculpta =

Species of gastropod

Talassia tenuisculpta is a species of very small sea snail, a marine gastropod mollusk in the family Vanikoridae.
