= Zeradina costellata =

- Shell of Zeradina costellata (holotype)

Scientific classification
- Kingdom: Animalia
- Phylum: Mollusca
- Class: Gastropoda
- Subclass: Caenogastropoda
- Order: Littorinimorpha
- Superfamily: Vanikoroidea
- Family: Vanikoridae
- Genus: Zeradina
- Species: †Z. costellata

Binomial name
- †Zeradina costellata (F. W. Hutton, 1885)

Synonyms
- † Aclis costellata F. W. Hutton, 1885

Species of gastropod

Zeradina costellata is an extinct species of sea snail, a marine gastropod mollusk in the family Vanikoridae.

== Description ==
(Original description) The minute shell is subulate. It contains six rounded whorls. The first two are smooth and polished, the rest spirally grooved. The spire whorls with the two posterior spiral grooves are deeper and broader than the others, and the rib between them is raised higher. They are crossed by delicate longitudinal plications. The body whorl is like those of the spire. The whole of the base is very finely spirally grooved. The suture is well marked. The aperture is ovate and less than half the length of the shell. The columella is arched. The umbilicus is covered.

== Distribution ==
Fossils of this marine species were found in Tertiary strata at Whanganui, New Zealand.
