= Macromphalina worsfoldi =

Scientific classification
- Kingdom: Animalia
- Phylum: Mollusca
- Class: Gastropoda
- Subclass: Caenogastropoda
- Order: Littorinimorpha
- Family: Vanikoridae
- Genus: Macromphalina
- Species: M. worsfoldi

Binomial name
- Macromphalina worsfoldi Rolan & Rubio, 1998

Species of gastropod

Macromphalina worsfoldi is a species of very small sea snail, a marine gastropod mollusk in the family Vanikoridae.

== Description and Distribution ==
The Macromphalina worsfoldi shell size is at most 1.7 mm wide. It is found in the Bahamas.
