= Zeradina producta =

- Shell of Zeradina producta (holotype)

Scientific classification
- Kingdom: Animalia
- Phylum: Mollusca
- Class: Gastropoda
- Subclass: Caenogastropoda
- Order: Littorinimorpha
- Superfamily: Vanikoroidea
- Family: Vanikoridae
- Genus: Zeradina
- Species: Z. producta

Binomial name
- Zeradina producta (Odhner, 1924)

Synonyms
- Fossarus productus Odhner, 1924 (original combination); ·

Species of gastropod

Zeradina producta is a species of sea snail, a marine gastropod mollusk in the family Vanikoridae.

== Description ==
The length of the shell attains 3.15 mm, its diameter 1.15 mm.

(Original description) The small, fragile shell is turreted. It is dull white, opaque and rimate.

It contains 5 1/4 convex whorls. The suture is deep. The apex is papillate. The protoconch consists of 2 smooth whorls. The next whorl is smooth, the 4th and subsequent show regular close, revolving cords and narrower sulci between them. The upper-most 4 cords are stronger, with somewhat broader interspaces. The uppermost cord is separated from the suture by a smooth (or faintly sulcate) zone. The lines of growth are rather inconspicuous. The spire is about 1 1/2 times the aperture in height, with straight outlines. The base is slightly convex. The aperture is narrowly ovate and rounded above. The peristome is thin and continuous. The outer lip is a little produced below the middle. The inner lip is narrowly sinuous with a few oblique furrows within, corresponding to the spiral cords. The columella is perpendicular and slowly curved. The columellar lip is narrow, reflected and appressed, limiting an umbilical groove. The parietal callus is very thin.

== Distribution ==
This marine species is endemic to New Zealand and occurs off Northland to Mayor Island, Bay of Plenty.
