= Macromphalina bouryi =

Scientific classification
- Kingdom: Animalia
- Phylum: Mollusca
- Class: Gastropoda
- Subclass: Caenogastropoda
- Order: Littorinimorpha
- Family: Vanikoridae
- Genus: Macromphalina
- Species: M. bouryi

Binomial name
- Macromphalina bouryi (Dautzenberg, 1912)

Species of gastropod

Macromphalina bouryi is a species of very small sea snail, a marine gastropod mollusk in the family Vanikoridae.
