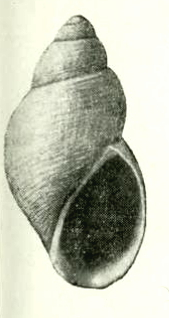
- Shell of Zeradina ovata (holotype)

Scientific classification
- Kingdom: Animalia
- Phylum: Mollusca
- Class: Gastropoda
- Subclass: Caenogastropoda
- Order: Littorinimorpha
- Superfamily: Vanikoroidea
- Family: Vanikoridae
- Genus: Zeradina
- Species: Z. ovata

Binomial name
- Zeradina ovata (Odhner, 1924)

Synonyms
- Fossarus ovatus Odhner, 1924 (original combination); Micreschara (Naridista) ovata (Odhner, 1924) · alternate representation; Micreschara ovata (Odhner, 1924); Zeradina (Naridista) ovata (Odhner, 1924) ·

= Zeradina ovata =

Species of gastropod

Zeradina ovata is a species of sea snail, a marine gastropod mollusk in the family Vanikoridae.

== Description ==
The length of the shell attains 3.75 mm, its diameter 1.9 mm.

(Original description) The small, fragile shell is elongate-ovate. It is hyaline white, shining and rimate. It contains 4 1/2 whorls, separated by a deep suture. The protoconch (the first 2 whorls) is smooth. The apex is somewhat obliquely flattened. The subsequent whorls are convex. The spire is as high as the aperture and has a convex outline. The base is slightly convex.

Sculpture: The shell shows very fine spiral striae at regular intervals, the two uppermost striae below the suture are broader. Besides fine lines of growth, a little flexuous, here and there somewhat elevated to fine longitudinal riblets cause an indistinct reticulation.

The aperture is narrowly ovate, angled above, its left contour slightly concave throughout (parietal wall not convex). The thin peristome is continuous The outer lip is sinuous below the suture, produced below the middle, the under lip somewhat retreating, and slightly bent down, forming a shallow and broad sinus. The columella is oblique, slightly curved, straight in the middle. The columellar lip is rather broadly reflected limiting an umbilical fissure and continuous on the parietal wall in a thin but distinct callus.

== Distribution ==
This marine species is endemic to New Zealand and occurs off Northland to Hauraki Gulf.
