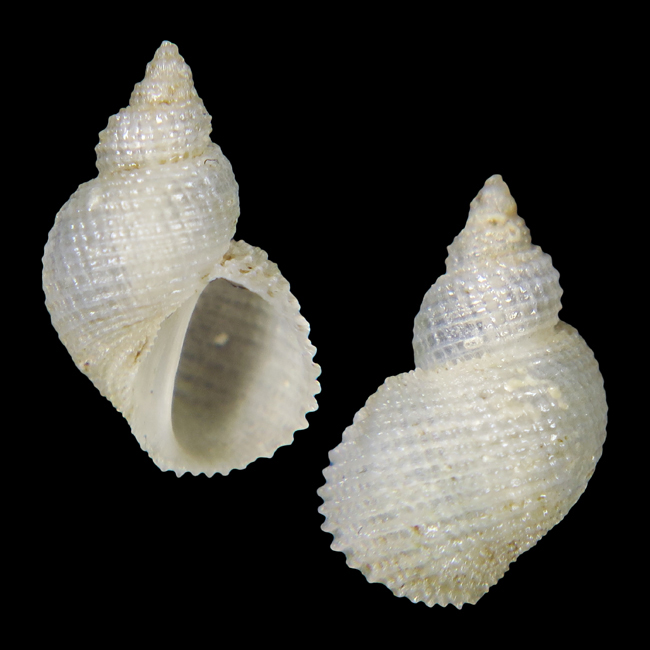

Scientific classification
- Kingdom: Animalia
- Phylum: Mollusca
- Class: Gastropoda
- Subclass: Caenogastropoda
- Order: Littorinimorpha
- Family: Vanikoridae
- Genus: Macromphalus
- Species: M. backeljaui

Binomial name
- Macromphalus backeljaui Poppe, Tagaro & Stahlschmidt, 2015

= Macromphalus backeljaui =

Species of gastropod

Macromphalus backeljaui is a species of sea snail, a marine gastropod mollusk in the family Vanikoridae.

== Original description ==
- Poppe G.T., Tagaro S.P. & Stahlschmidt P. (2015). New shelled molluscan species from the central Philippines I. Visaya. 4(3): 15-59.

page(s): 26, pl. 9 figs 1-2.
