= Macromphalina susoi =

Scientific classification
- Kingdom: Animalia
- Phylum: Mollusca
- Class: Gastropoda
- Subclass: Caenogastropoda
- Order: Littorinimorpha
- Family: Vanikoridae
- Genus: Macromphalina
- Species: M. susoi

Binomial name
- Macromphalina susoi Rolán & Rubio, 1998

Species of gastropod

Macromphalina susoi is a species of very small sea snail, a marine gastropod mollusk in the family Vanikoridae.

== Distribution ==
It is found in the eastern Gulf of Mexico.

== Description ==
The maximum recorded shell length is 3.2 mm.

== Habitat ==
Minimum recorded depth is 37 m. Maximum recorded depth is 37 m.
