= Macromphalina pierrot =

Scientific classification
- Kingdom: Animalia
- Phylum: Mollusca
- Class: Gastropoda
- Subclass: Caenogastropoda
- Order: Littorinimorpha
- Family: Vanikoridae
- Genus: Macromphalina
- Species: M. pierrot

Binomial name
- Macromphalina pierrot Gardner, 1948

Species of gastropod

Macromphalina pierrot (sometimes incorrectly emended as Macromphalina pierroti) is a species of very small sea snail, a marine gastropod mollusk in the family Vanikoridae.

== Description ==
The maximum recorded shell length is 3.2 mm.

== Habitat ==
Minimum recorded depth is 20 m. Maximum recorded depth is 20 m.
