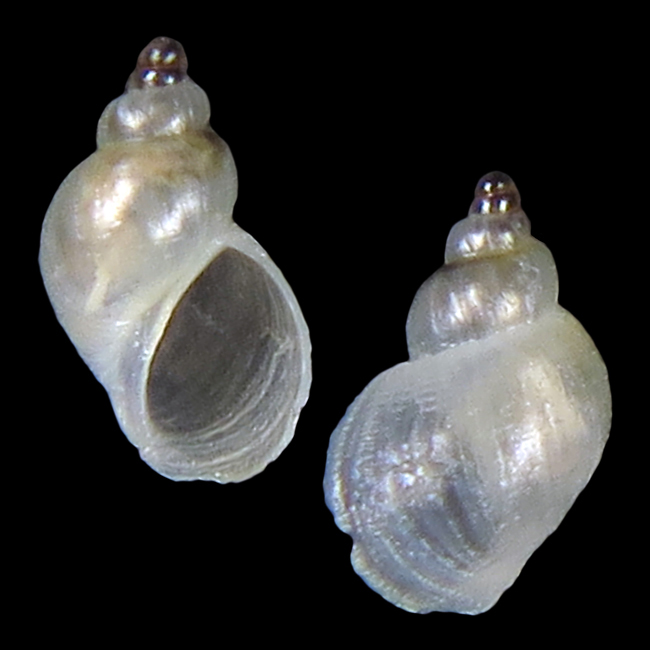

Scientific classification
- Kingdom: Animalia
- Phylum: Mollusca
- Class: Gastropoda
- Subclass: Caenogastropoda
- Order: Littorinimorpha
- Superfamily: Vanikoroidea
- Family: Vanikoridae
- Genus: Zeradina
- Species: Z. translucida

Binomial name
- Zeradina translucida Poppe, Tagaro & Stahlschmidt, 2015

= Zeradina translucida =

Species of gastropod

Zeradina translucida is a species of sea snail, a marine gastropod mollusc in the family Vanikoridae.

== Distribution ==
This marine species occurs off the Philippines.
