= Macromphalina garcesi =

Scientific classification
- Kingdom: Animalia
- Phylum: Mollusca
- Class: Gastropoda
- Subclass: Caenogastropoda
- Order: Littorinimorpha
- Family: Vanikoridae
- Genus: Macromphalina
- Species: M. garcesi

Binomial name
- Macromphalina garcesi Rolan & Rubio, 1998

Species of gastropod

Macromphalina garcesi is a species of very small sea snail, a marine gastropod mollusk in the family Vanikoridae.

== Description ==
The maximum recorded shell length is 2.5 mm.

== Habitat ==
The minimum recorded depth for this species is 20 m; maximum recorded depth is 56 m.
