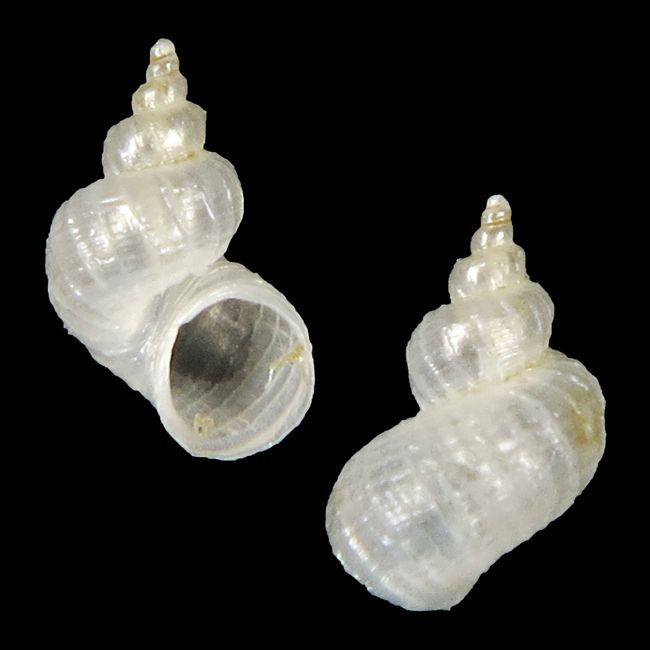
- Shell of Zeradina fedosovi

Scientific classification
- Kingdom: Animalia
- Phylum: Mollusca
- Class: Gastropoda
- Subclass: Caenogastropoda
- Order: Littorinimorpha
- Family: Vanikoridae
- Genus: Zeradina
- Species: Z. fedosovi

Binomial name
- Zeradina fedosovi Poppe, Tagaro & Goto, 2018

= Zeradina fedosovi =

Species of gastropod

Zeradina fedosovi is a species of sea snail, a marine gastropod mollusk in the family Vanikoridae.

== Distribution ==
This marine species occurs off the Philippines.

== Original description ==
- Poppe G.T., Tagaro S.P. & Goto Y. (2018). New marine species from the Central Philippines. Visaya. 5(1): 91-135. page(s): 100, pl. 6 figs 4–5.
