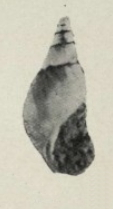
- Shell of Zeradina aculeata (holotype)

Scientific classification
- Kingdom: Animalia
- Phylum: Mollusca
- Class: Gastropoda
- Subclass: Caenogastropoda
- Order: Littorinimorpha
- Family: Vanikoridae
- Genus: Zeradina
- Species: †Z. aculeata

Binomial name
- †Zeradina aculeata Laws, 1939

= Zeradina aculeata =

Species of gastropod

Zeradina aculeata is an extinct species of sea snail, a marine gastropod mollusk in the family Vanikoridae.

== Description ==
The length of the shell attains 3.2 mm, its diameter 1.5 mm.

(Original description) The shell is small. The spire is high and narrow with a sharpened apex. The height of the spire is about ⅓ that of the body whorl. The whorls are convex. The suture is well cut-in, a little channelled. The two whorls of the protoconch are pointed with axial lamellae just below the suture for a short distance, spirals developing on the lower half of the last whorl. The body whorl is very long, convex in a broad sweep from suture to base. The aperture is ovate. The outer lip is effuse below. The inner lip is separated from the body anteriorly by a groove. The columella is long, thin and arcuate. It is set vertically. The axial sculpture, other than rude growth-plications, is lacking except on the first adult whorl where there are thin curved axial lamellae dependent on a short distance from the suture. Irregular weak spiral ridges and grooves are present over the surface of all whorls. None of these spirals are constantly more in evidence than others.

== Distribution ==
Fossils of this marine species were found in Tertiary strata at Kaipara, New Zealand.
