= Talassia coriacea =

Scientific classification
- Kingdom: Animalia
- Phylum: Mollusca
- Class: Gastropoda
- Subclass: Caenogastropoda
- Order: Littorinimorpha
- Family: Vanikoridae
- Genus: Talassia
- Species: T. coriacea

Binomial name
- Talassia coriacea (Manzoni, 1868)

Species of gastropod

Talassia coriacea is a species of very small sea snail, a marine gastropod mollusk in the family Vanikoridae.
