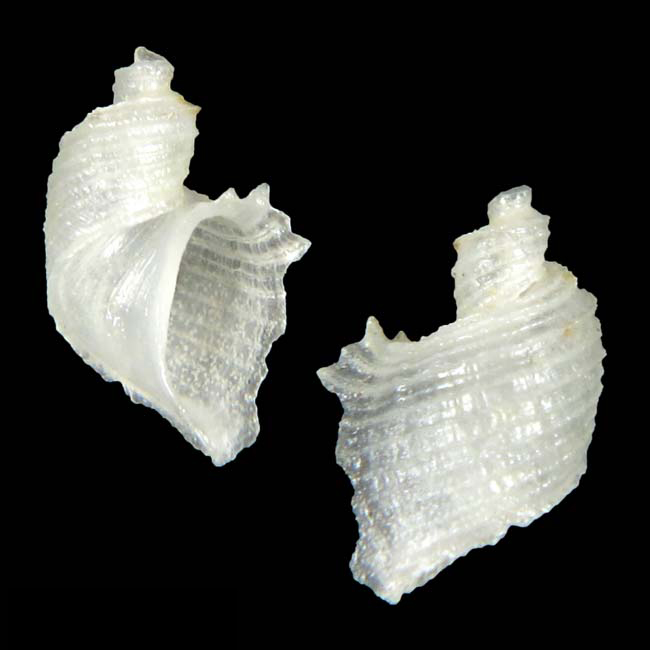

Scientific classification
- Kingdom: Animalia
- Phylum: Mollusca
- Class: Gastropoda
- Subclass: Caenogastropoda
- Order: Littorinimorpha
- Family: Vanikoridae
- Genus: Macromphalus
- Species: M. magnificus

Binomial name
- Macromphalus magnificus Poppe & Tagaro, 2016

= Macromphalus magnificus =

Species of gastropod

Macromphalus magnificus is a species of sea snail, a marine gastropod mollusk in the family Vanikoridae.

== Original description ==
- Poppe G.T. & Tagaro S. (2016). New marine mollusks from the central Philippines in the families Aclididae, Chilodontidae, Cuspidariidae, Nuculanidae, Nystiellidae, Seraphsidae and Vanikoridae. Visaya. 4(5): 83-103. page(s): 93.
