= Vanikoro striatus =

Scientific classification
- Kingdom: Animalia
- Phylum: Mollusca
- Class: Gastropoda
- Subclass: Caenogastropoda
- Order: Littorinimorpha
- Family: Vanikoridae
- Genus: Vanikoro
- Species: V. striatus

Binomial name
- Vanikoro striatus (d’Orbigny, 1842)

Species of gastropod

Vanikoro striatus is a species of very small sea snail, a marine gastropod mollusk in the family Vanikoridae.
