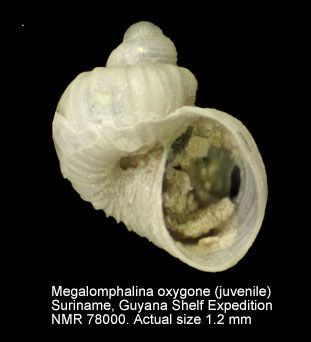
- =Megalomphalus oxychone

Scientific classification
- Kingdom: Animalia
- Phylum: Mollusca
- Class: Gastropoda
- Subclass: Caenogastropoda
- Order: Littorinimorpha
- Family: Vanikoridae
- Genus: Megalomphalus
- Species: M. oxychone

Binomial name
- Megalomphalus oxychone (Mörch, 1877)

= Megalomphalus oxychone =

Species of gastropod

Megalomphalus oxychone is a species of very small sea snail, a marine gastropod mollusk in the family Vanikoridae.

== Description ==
The maximum recorded shell length is 4 mm.

== Habitat ==
Minimum recorded depth is 0 m. Maximum recorded depth is 60 m.
