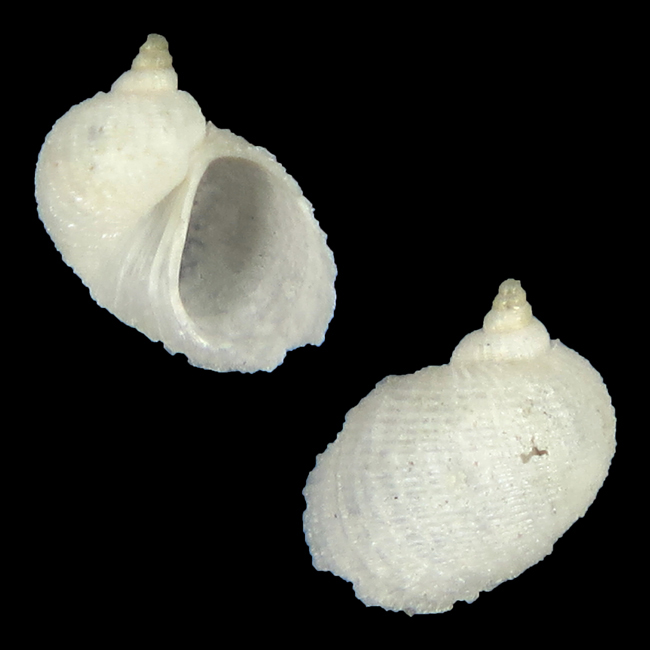

Scientific classification
- Kingdom: Animalia
- Phylum: Mollusca
- Class: Gastropoda
- Subclass: Caenogastropoda
- Order: Littorinimorpha
- Family: Vanikoridae
- Genus: Zeradina
- Species: Z. parva

Binomial name
- Zeradina parva Poppe, Tagaro & Stahlschmidt, 2015

= Zeradina parva =

Species of gastropod

Zeradina parva is a species of sea snail, a marine gastropod mollusk in the family Vanikoridae.

== Distribution ==
This marine species occurs off the Philippines.

== Original description ==
- Poppe G.T., Tagaro S.P. & Stahlschmidt P. (2015). New shelled molluscan species from the central Philippines I. Visaya. 4(3): 15–59. page(s): 28, pl. 10 figs 1–2.
