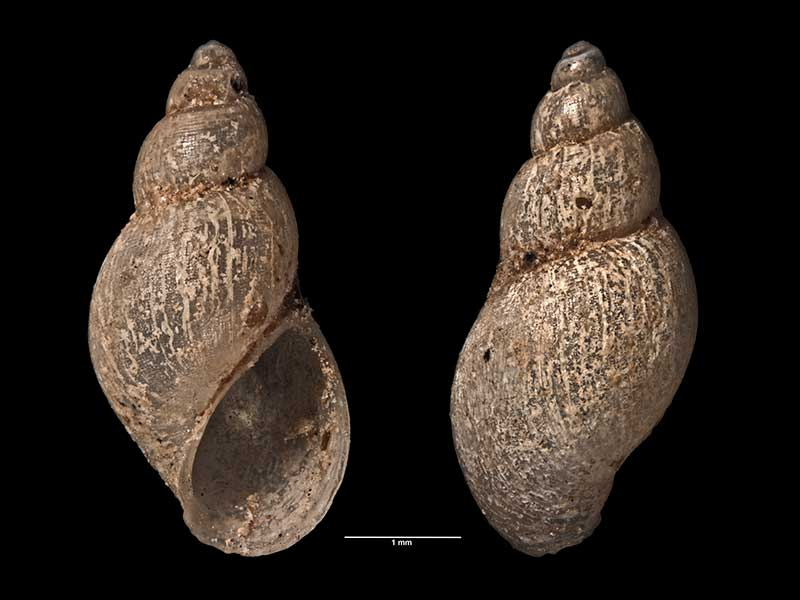
- Shell of Zeradina odhneri (specimen at Auckland Museum)

Scientific classification
- Kingdom: Animalia
- Phylum: Mollusca
- Class: Gastropoda
- Subclass: Caenogastropoda
- Order: Littorinimorpha
- Family: Vanikoridae
- Genus: Zeradina
- Species: Z. odhneri

Binomial name
- Zeradina odhneri A. W. B. Powell, 1927

= Zeradina odhneri =

Species of gastropod

Zeradina odhneri is a species of sea snail, a marine gastropod mollusk in the family Vanikoridae.

== Description ==
The length of the holotype attains 4.5 mm, its diameter 1.4 mm.

(Original description) The shell is small, thin, elongate-ovate, and a dull white color. The protoconch is dome-shaped, rather large, and consists of 1 ½ smooth, glassy whorls. There are 4 ½ whorls in total, which are separated by a deep suture. The spire is a little higher than the aperture and features a convex outline.

The sculpture consists of exceedingly fine, numerous, and regular spiral striae (fine ridges or grooves), which are indistinctly reticulated (crisscrossed) by fine, close, thread-like axial growth lines. The aperture is narrowly ovate, being angled above and broadly rounded below. The peristome (the margin of the aperture) is thin and continuous, and it is separated from the parietal wall. The outer lip is flexuous; it is retractive below the suture for a short distance, where it forms a broad, shallow sinus, and it becomes protractive below the center of the whorl.

== Distribution ==
This marine species is endemic to New Zealand and occurs off Ahipara, Northland.
