= Macromphalina floridana =

Scientific classification
- Kingdom: Animalia
- Phylum: Mollusca
- Class: Gastropoda
- Subclass: Caenogastropoda
- Order: Littorinimorpha
- Family: Vanikoridae
- Genus: Macromphalina
- Species: M. floridana

Binomial name
- Macromphalina floridana Moore, 1965

Species of gastropod

Macromphalina floridana is a species of very small sea snail, a marine gastropod mollusk in the family Vanikoridae.

== Description ==
The maximum recorded shell length is 3.1 mm.

== Habitat ==
The minimum recorded depth for this species is 1 m; maximum recorded depth is 34.5 m.
