= Macromphalina jibacoa =

Scientific classification
- Kingdom: Animalia
- Phylum: Mollusca
- Class: Gastropoda
- Subclass: Caenogastropoda
- Order: Littorinimorpha
- Family: Vanikoridae
- Genus: Macromphalina
- Species: M. jibacoa

Binomial name
- Macromphalina jibacoa Rolán & Rubio, 1998

Species of gastropod

Macromphalina jibacoa is a species of very small sea snail, a marine gastropod mollusk in the family Vanikoridae.

== Distribution ==
This species occurs in the following areas:

- Caribbean Sea
- Cuba
- Gulf of Mexico

== Description ==
The maximum recorded shell length is 1.82 mm.

== Habitat ==
The minimum recorded depth for this species is 4 m; maximum recorded depth is 4 m.
