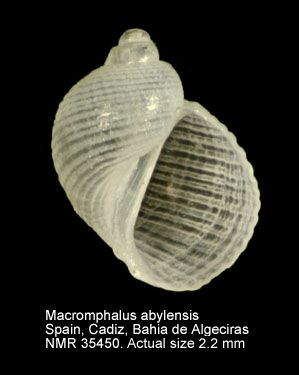

Scientific classification
- Kingdom: Animalia
- Phylum: Mollusca
- Class: Gastropoda
- Subclass: Caenogastropoda
- Order: Littorinimorpha
- Family: Vanikoridae
- Genus: Macromphalus
- Species: M. abylensis

Binomial name
- Macromphalus abylensis Warén & Bouchet, 1988

= Macromphalus abylensis =

Species of gastropod

Macromphalus abylensis is a species of very small sea snail, a marine gastropod mollusk in the family Vanikoridae.
