= Megalomphalus ronaldi =

Scientific classification
- Kingdom: Animalia
- Phylum: Mollusca
- Class: Gastropoda
- Subclass: Caenogastropoda
- Order: Littorinimorpha
- Family: Vanikoridae
- Genus: Megalomphalus
- Species: M. ronaldi

Binomial name
- Megalomphalus ronaldi Segers, Swinnen & De Prins, 2009

Species of gastropod

Megalomphalus ronaldi is a species of very small sea snail, a marine gastropod mollusk in the family Vanikoridae.
