= Macromphalina thompsoni =

Scientific classification
- Kingdom: Animalia
- Phylum: Mollusca
- Class: Gastropoda
- Subclass: Caenogastropoda
- Order: Littorinimorpha
- Family: Vanikoridae
- Genus: Macromphalina
- Species: M. thompsoni

Binomial name
- Macromphalina thompsoni Rolan & Rubio, 1998

Species of gastropod

Macromphalina thompsoni is a species of very small sea snail, a marine gastropod mollusk in the family Vanikoridae.
