= Fossarus macmurdensis =

Scientific classification
- Kingdom: Animalia
- Phylum: Mollusca
- Class: Gastropoda
- Subclass: Caenogastropoda
- Order: incertae sedis
- Family: Planaxidae
- Genus: Fossarus
- Species: F. macmurdensis

Binomial name
- Fossarus macmurdensis (Hedley, 1911)

Species of gastropod

Fossarus macmurdensis is a species of sea snail, a marine gastropod mollusc in the family Planaxidae.
