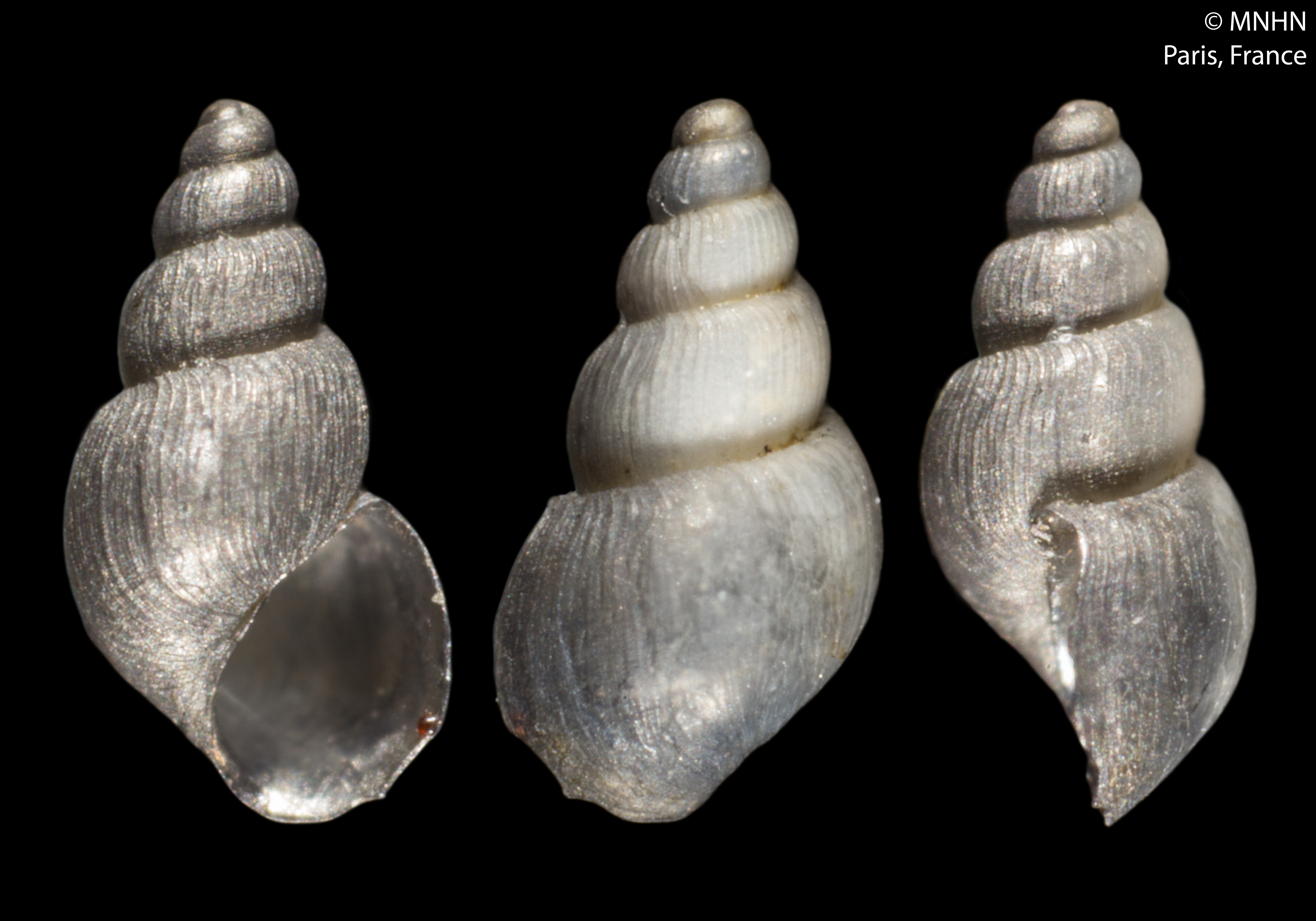
- Shell of Talassia dagueneti

Scientific classification
- Kingdom: Animalia
- Phylum: Mollusca
- Class: Gastropoda
- Subclass: Caenogastropoda
- Order: Littorinimorpha
- Superfamily: Vanikoroidea
- Family: Vanikoridae
- Genus: Talassia; Warén & Bouchet, 1988

Type species
- Rissoa coriacea Manzoni, 1868 a

Synonyms
- Cymenorytis (Talassia) Warén & Bouchet, 1988

= Talassia =

Genus of gastropods

Talassia is a genus of very small sea snails, marine gastropod mollusks in the family Vanikoridae.

== Species ==
Species within the genus Talassia include:

- Talassia coriacea (Manzoni, 1868)
- Talassia dagueneti (de Folin, 1873)
- Talassia flexisculpta Hoffman & Freiwald, 2022
- Talassia laevapex Hoffman & Freiwald, 2022
- Talassia macrostoma (Thiele, 1925)
- Talassia mexicana Hoffman & Freiwald, 2022
- Talassia philippeswi nneni Rolán & Swinnen, 2011
- † Talassia rissoides (Gougerot & Le Renard, 1978)
- Talassia rugosa Hoffman & Freiwald, 2022
- Talassia sandersoni (A. E. Verrill, 1884)
- Talassia tenuisculpta (Watson, 1873)
