= Larsenia =

Scientific classification
- Kingdom: Animalia
- Phylum: Mollusca
- Class: Gastropoda
- Subclass: Caenogastropoda
- Order: Littorinimorpha
- Family: Vanikoridae
- Genus: Larsenia; Warén, 1989

Genus of gastropods

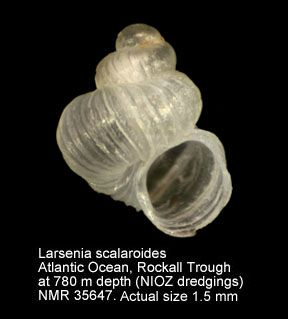
Larsenia Scararoides Shell

Larsenia is a genus of extremely small sea snails, marine gastropod mollusks or micromollusks in the family Vanikoridae.

== Species ==
Species within the genus Larsenia include:

- Larsenia scalaroides Warén, 1989
