= Macromphalina =

Scientific classification
- Kingdom: Animalia
- Phylum: Mollusca
- Class: Gastropoda
- Subclass: Caenogastropoda
- Order: Littorinimorpha
- Family: Vanikoridae
- Genus: Macromphalina; Cossmann, 1888

Genus of very small sea snails

Macromphalina is a genus of very small sea snails, marine gastropod mollusks in the family Vanikoridae.

== Species ==
Species within the genus Macromphalina include:

- Macromphalina alfredensis (Bartsch, 1915)
- Macromphalina apexplanum Rolan & Rubio, 1998
- Macromphalina argentea (Bartsch, 1918)
- Macromphalina argentina Castellanos, 1975
- Macromphalina bouryi (Dautzenberg, 1912)
- Macromphalina canarreos Rolan & Rubio, 1998
- Macromphalina cryptophila (Carpenter, 1857)
- Macromphalina dautzenbergi Adam & Knudsen
- Macromphalina diazmerlanoi Rolan & Rubio, 1998
- Macromphalina dipsycha (Pilsbry & Olsson, 1945)
- Macromphalina equatorialis (Pilsbry & Olsson, 1945)
- Macromphalina floridana Moore, 1965
- Macromphalina garcesi Rolan & Rubio, 1998
- Macromphalina gofasi Rubio & Rolán, 1994
- Macromphalina hancocki (Strong & Hertlein, 1939)
- Macromphalina harryleei Rolan & Rubio, 1998
- Macromphalina hypernotia Pilsbry & Olsson, 1952
- Macromphalina immersiceps (Pilsbry & Olsson, 1945)
- Macromphalina jibacoa Rolán & Rubio, 1998
- Macromphalina lyrapintoae Barros, 1994
- Macromphalina palmalitoris Pilsbry & McGinty, 1950
- Macromphalina panamensis (Bartsch, 1918)
- Macromphalina paradoxa Rolan & Rubio, 1998
- Macromphalina peruvianus (Pilsbry & Olsson, 1945)
- Macromphalina philippii (Pilsbry & Olsson, 1945)
- Macromphalina pierrot Gardner, 1948
- Macromphalina recticeps (Pilsbry & Olsson, 1945)
- Macromphalina redferni Rolan & Rubio, 1998
- Macromphalina robertsoni Rolan & Rubio, 1998
- Macromphalina scabra (Philippi, 1849)
- Macromphalina souverbiei (de Folin, 1867)
- Macromphalina susoi Rolán & Rubio, 1998
- Macromphalina symmetrica (Pilsbry & Olsson, 1945)
- Macromphalina thompsoni Rolan & Rubio, 1998
- Macromphalina worsfoldi Rolan & Rubio, 1998

Taxon inquirendum

- Macromphalina lacuniformis (R. B. Watson, 1886)

Species brought into synonymy

- Macromphalina californica Dall, 1903: synonym of Megalomphalus californicus (Dall, 1903) (original combination)
- Macromphalina lozoueti (a MS name that appears on some websites)
- Macromphalina peruvianus [sic]: synonym of Macromphalina peruviana (Pilsbry & Olsson, 1945) (incorrect gender ending)
