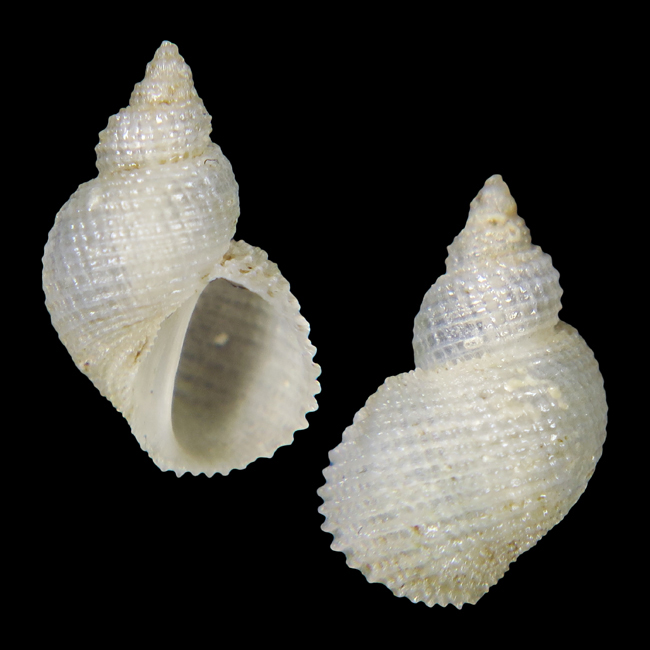
- Shell of Macromphalus backeljaui

Scientific classification
- Kingdom: Animalia
- Phylum: Mollusca
- Class: Gastropoda
- Subclass: Caenogastropoda
- Order: Littorinimorpha
- Family: Vanikoridae
- Genus: Macromphalus; S.V. Wood, 1842

Type species
- † Macromphalus reticulatus S. V. Wood, 1842 (type by monotypy)

Synonyms
- Couthouyia A. Adams, 1860; † Dialytostoma Cossmann, 1888; † Escharella Cossmann, 1888 (invalid: junior homonym of Escharella Gray, 1848 [Bryozoa]); Escharella (Dialytostoma) Cossmann, 1888 junior subjective synonym; † Escharella (Micromphalina) Cossmann, 1888 junior subjective synonym; Fossarus (Couthouyia) A. Adams, 1860 (junior synonym); † Macromphalus (Dialytostoma) Cossmann, 1888 junior subjective synonym; Macromphalus (Macromphalus) S. V. Wood, 1842 superseded rank; † Macromphalus (Micreschara) Cossmann, 1889 junior subjective synonym; Micreschara Cossmann, 1889 (junior subjective synonym); † Micromphalina Cossmann, 1888 junior subjective synonym; † Vanikoro (Micromphalina) Cossmann, 1888 junior subjective synonym

= Macromphalus =

Genus of gastropods

Macromphalus is a genus of very small sea snails, marine gastropod mollusks or micromollusks in the family Vanikoridae.

== General characteristics ==
(Original description) The shell is fusiform, with an elevated spire and an ovate aperture. The outer lip is sharp, and the umbilicus forms a narrow, linear opening.

(Described as Couthouyia) The shell is ovate, with a deep, broad umbilical chink and an acuminate spire. The whorls are convex and bear intersecting sculpture, while the body whorl is inflated. The sutures are impressed.

The aperture is semi-ovate. The inner lip is straight, narrow, and free, widening anteriorly, and the umbilical chink is elongated. The outer lip is simple and curved, with a sharp, entire margin.

== Species ==
Species within the genus Macromphalus include:

- Macromphalus abylensisWarén & Bouchet, 1988
- Macromphalus aculeatus (Hedley, 1900)
- Macromphalus aethiopicus (Thiele, 1925)
- † Macromphalus agnesae Pacaud & Pons, 2015
- Macromphalus asperus (Hedley, 1912)
- Macromphalus backeljaui Poppe, Tagaro & Stahlschmidt, 2015
- † Macromphalus bourgeoisi (de Morgan, 1916)
- Macromphalus celsoi Poppe & Tagaro, 2026
- † Macromphalus citharella (Cossmann, 1888)
- Macromphalus comorensis (Thiele, 1925)
- Macromphalus crebrestriatus (Thiele, 1925)
- Macromphalus decussatus (A. Adams, 1860)
- † Macromphalus disjunctus (de Raincourt & Munier-Chalmas, 1863)
- † Macromphalus elegans (Deshayes, 1861)
- † Macromphalus fischeri (de Laubrière, 1881) ((accepted > unreplaced junior homonym, of Fossarus fischeri Mörch, 1877))
- Macromphalus gracilis (Brazier, 1894)
- † Macromphalus imacampensis Lozouet, 1998
- Macromphalus incertus (Turton, 1932)
- Macromphalus indicus (E. A. Smith, 1894)
- Macromphalus inflatus (Thiele, 1925)
- Macromphalus insignis (G. Nevill & H. Nevill, 1871)
- Macromphalus jinyuae L.-W. Lin, 2023
- Macromphalus liae W.-J. Chen & C.-F. Tseng, 2023
- † Macromphalus lozoueti Landau, Marquet & Grigis, 2004
- † Macromphalus magnei (Vergneau, 1963)
- Macromphalus magnificus Poppe & Tagaro, 2016
- Macromphalus mzambanus (Kilburn, 1977)
- Macromphalus pasithea (Kilburn, 1977)
- Macromphalus pliciferus (A. Adams, 1863)
- Macromphalus reticulatus (A. Adams, 1855) (accepted > unreplaced junior homonym, non S. V. Wood, 1842)
- † Macromphalus reticulatus S. V. Wood, 1842
- † Macromphalus roberti (de Morgan, 1916)
- Macromphalus saharicus Rubio & Rolan, 1994
- † Macromphalus scalariformis (Morlet, 1888)
- Macromphalus senegalensis (Knudsen, 1956)
- † Macromphalus similis Gougerot & Le Renard, 1982
- Macromphalus striatulus (A. Adams, 1863)
- Macromphalus styliferinus (Nevill, 1884)
- Macromphalus subreticulatus (Nevill, 1884)
- † Macromphalus subsolutus (Cossmann, 1888)
- Macromphalus sundaicus (Thiele, 1925)
- Macromphalus superbus (Thiele, 1925)
- † Macromphalus terebralis (Cossmann, 1885)
- Macromphalus thelacme (Melvill, 1904)
- Macromphalus tornatilis (A. A. Gould, 1859)
- Macromphalus tyroi Hoenselaar & Moolenbeck, 1994
- Macromphalus walkeri Poppe, Tagaro & Stahlschmidt, 2015
- Macromphalus yamamotoi (Habe, 1978)

Species brought into synonymy

- † Macromphalus decussatus (Cossmann, 1888): synonym of † Macromphalina decussata (Cossmann, 1888)
- Macromphalus okamotoi (T. Habe, 1962): synonym of Amamiconcha okamotoi T. Habe, 1962 (unaccepted > superseded combination)
- † Macromphalus stantoni Bandel & Kowalke, 1997: synonym of † Macromphalina stantoni (superseded combination)
