= Radinista =

Scientific classification
- Kingdom: Animalia
- Phylum: Mollusca
- Class: Gastropoda
- Subclass: Caenogastropoda
- Order: Littorinimorpha
- Superfamily: Vanikoroidea
- Family: Vanikoridae
- Genus: Radinista; Finlay, 1926

Type species
- Couthouyia corrugata Hedley, 1904

Synonyms
- Zeradina (Radinista) Finlay, 1926

Genus of molluscs

Radinista is a genus of gastropods belonging to the family Vanikoridae.

== Species ==
- † Radinista concinna (P. Marshall & Murdoch, 1921) †
- Radinista corrugata (Hedley, 1904)
- † Radinista exilis (Murdoch, 1900) †
- Radinista scalarina (A. W. B. Powell, 1940)
- † Radinista vivienneae (Laws, 1939)
