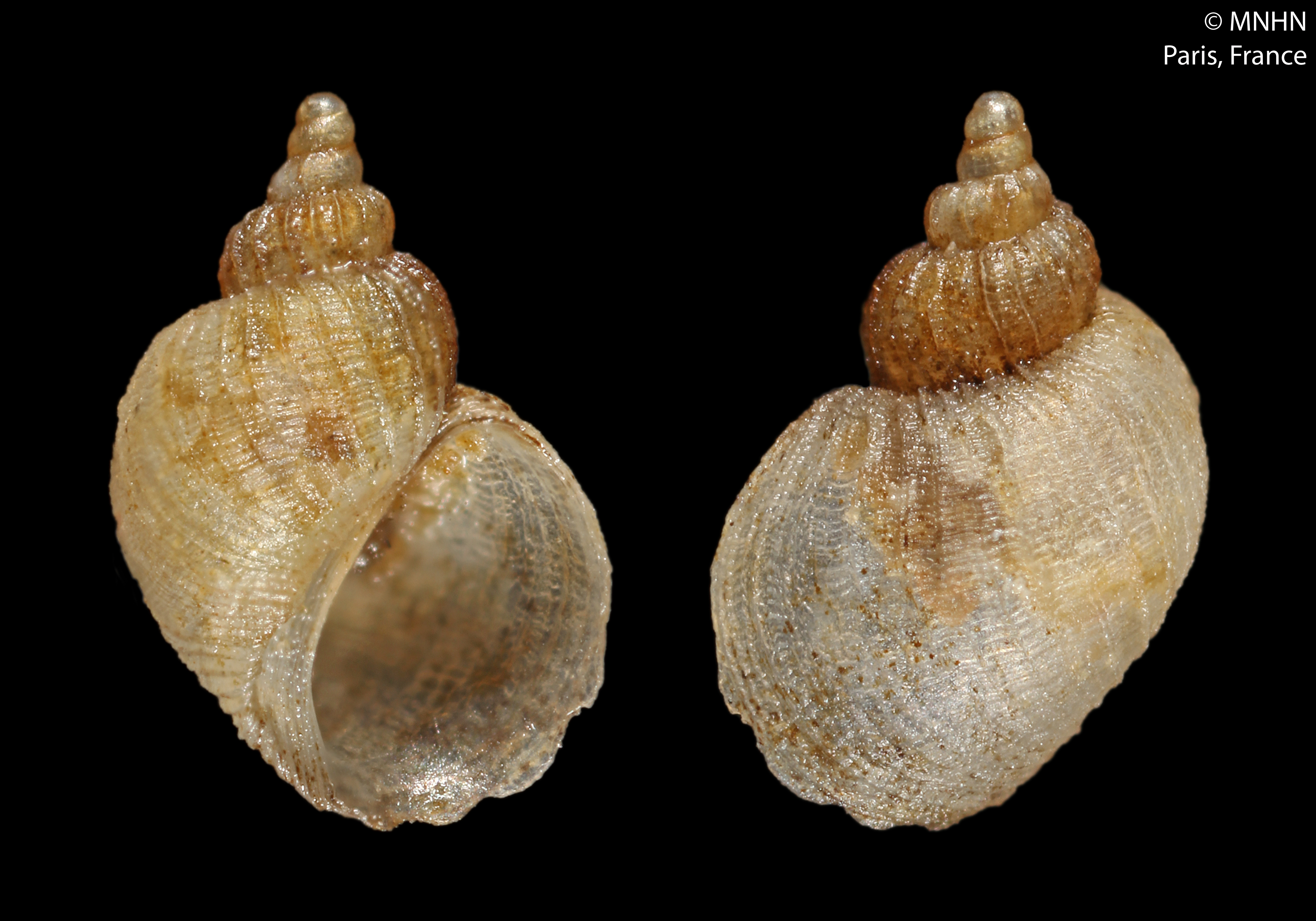
- Shell of Zeradina parva

Scientific classification
- Kingdom: Animalia
- Phylum: Mollusca
- Class: Gastropoda
- Subclass: Caenogastropoda
- Order: Littorinimorpha
- Superfamily: Vanikoroidea
- Family: Vanikoridae
- Genus: Zeradina; Finlay, 1926

Type species
- Fossarus ovatus Odhner, 1924

= Zeradina =

Genus of molluscs

Zeradina is a genus of gastropods belonging to the family Vanikoridae.

The species of this genus are found in New Zealand and Northern America.

== Species ==
- † Zeradina aculeata Laws, 1939
- † Zeradina costellata (F.W.Hutton, 1885)
- † Zeradina esculenta Laws, 1944
- Zeradina fedosovi Poppe, Tagaro & Goto, 2018
- Zeradina odhneri Powell, 1927
- Zeradina ovata (Odhner, 1924)
- Zeradina parva Poppe, Tagaro & Stahlschmidt, 2015
- Zeradina plicifera (A. Adams, 1863)
- Zeradina producta (Odhner, 1924)
- Zeradina translucida Poppe, Tagaro & Stahlschmidt, 2015

Synonyms

- Zeradina corrugata (Hedley, 1904): synonym of Radinista corrugata (Hedley, 1904)
- †Zeradina jocelynae Finlay, 1930: synonym of † Macromphalina jocelynae (Laws, 1939) (superseded combination)
- † Zeradina obliquecostata (P. Marshall & Murdoch, 1920): synonym of † Microstelma obliquecostatum (P. Marshall & Murdoch, 1920)
- Zeradina poutama E. C. Smith, 1962: synonym of Eatoniella (Albosabula) poutama (E. C. Smith, 1962) represented as Eatoniella poutama (E. C. Smith, 1962) (superseded combination)
- Zeradina scalarina A. W. B. Powell, 1940: synonym of Radinista scalarina (A. W. B. Powell, 1940)
- † Zeradina vivienneae Laws, 1939 : synonym of † Radinista vivienneae (Laws, 1939) (superseded combination)
