= Fossarus orbignyi =

Scientific classification
- Kingdom: Animalia
- Phylum: Mollusca
- Class: Gastropoda
- Subclass: Caenogastropoda
- Order: incertae sedis
- Family: Planaxidae
- Genus: Fossarus
- Species: F. orbignyi

Binomial name
- Fossarus orbignyi P. Fischer, 1864

Species of gastropod

Fossarus orbignyi is a species of sea snail, a marine gastropod mollusk in the family Planaxidae.
