= Fossarus bellus =

Scientific classification
- Kingdom: Animalia
- Phylum: Mollusca
- Class: Gastropoda
- Subclass: Caenogastropoda
- Order: incertae sedis
- Family: Planaxidae
- Genus: Fossarus
- Species: F. bellus

Binomial name
- Fossarus bellus Dall, 1889

Synonyms
- Parviturbo bellus Dall, 1889

Species of gastropod

Fossarus bellus is a species of sea snail, a marine gastropod mollusc in the family Planaxidae.

== Description ==
The maximum recorded shell length is 3.5 mm.

== Habitat ==
Minimum recorded depth is 18 m. Maximum recorded depth is 196 m.
