= Megalomphalus petitianus =

Scientific classification
- Kingdom: Animalia
- Phylum: Mollusca
- Class: Gastropoda
- Subclass: Caenogastropoda
- Order: Littorinimorpha
- Family: Vanikoridae
- Genus: Megalomphalus
- Species: M. petitianus

Binomial name
- Megalomphalus petitianus (Tiberi, 1869)

Synonyms
- Fossarus petitianus Tiberi, 1869 (basionym)

Species of gastropod

Megalomphalus petitianus is a species of very small sea snail, a marine gastropod mollusk in the family Vanikoridae.
