= Fossarus erythraeensis =

Scientific classification
- Kingdom: Animalia
- Phylum: Mollusca
- Class: Gastropoda
- Subclass: Caenogastropoda
- Order: incertae sedis
- Family: Planaxidae
- Genus: Fossarus
- Species: F. erythraeensis

Binomial name
- Fossarus erythraeensis E. Lamy, 1938

Species of gastropod

Fossarus erythraeensis is a species of sea snail, a marine gastropod mollusk in the family Planaxidae.

WoRMS indicates this species as a taxon inquirendum.

== Distribution ==
This species occurs in the Red Sea.
