= Megalomphalus azoneus =

- Shell of Megalomphalus azoneus (specimen at the Natural History Museum, Rotterdam)

Scientific classification
- Kingdom: Animalia
- Phylum: Mollusca
- Class: Gastropoda
- Subclass: Caenogastropoda
- Order: Littorinimorpha
- Family: Vanikoridae
- Genus: Megalomphalus
- Species: M. azoneus

Binomial name
- Megalomphalus azoneus (Brusina, 1865)

Synonyms
- Adeorbis depressus (G. Seguenza, 1876) superseded combination; Adeorbis seguenzai [sic] misspelling - incorrect subsequent spelling; Adeorbis seguenzianus Tryon, 1888; Fossarus depressus Seguenza, 1876; Fossarus disciformis Granata-Grillo, 1877 (basionym); Fossarus disciformis var. disjuncta Granata Grillo, 1877; Lacuna azonata Locard, 1886 unjustified emendation (of Stomatia azonea Brusina, 1865); Megalomphalus azonus Monterosato, 1884 unjustified emendation; Megalomphalus depressus (G. Seguenza, 1876) junior homonym (invalid: secondary junior homonym of Adeorbis depressus A. Adams, 1861; Adeorbis seguenzianus is a replacement name); Megalomphalus disciformis (Granata Grillo, 1877) junior subjective synonym; Megalomphalus mercatoris Adam & Knudsen, 1969; Natica crosseana Weinkauff, 1868; Stomatia azonea Brusina, 1865 superseded combination

Species of gastropod

Megalomphalus azoneus is a species of very small sea snail, a marine gastropod mollusc in the family Vanikoridae.

== Distribution ==
This species is found in the Mediterranean Sea.

== Description ==
The maximum recorded shell length is 4 mm.

(Described as Adeorbis seguenzianus) The shell is white and widely umbilicated. It has very oblique whorls, an elevated spire, and an impressed suture. Its surface is microscopically striate, with spiral lines between the striae. The body whorl is very oblique, and an obtuse angulation of the base surrounds the umbilicus.

== Habitat ==
Minimum recorded depth is 27 m. Maximum recorded depth is 95 m.

== Bibliography ==
- Warén, A.; Bouchet, P. (1988). "A new species of Vanikoridae from the western Mediterranean, with remarks on the Northeast Atlantic species of the family". Bollettino Malacologico. 24 (5–8): 73–100.
- Gofas, S.; Le Renard, J.; Bouchet, P. (2001). "Mollusca". In Costello, M.J.; et al. (eds.). European register of marine species: a check-list of the marine species in Europe and a bibliography of guides to their identification. Collection Patrimoines Naturels. Vol. 50. pp. 180–213.
