= Fossarus lamellosus =

Scientific classification
- Kingdom: Animalia
- Phylum: Mollusca
- Class: Gastropoda
- Subclass: Caenogastropoda
- Order: incertae sedis
- Family: Planaxidae
- Genus: Fossarus
- Species: F. lamellosus

Binomial name
- Fossarus lamellosus (Montrouzier, 1861)

Synonyms
- Littorina lamellosa Montrouzier, 1861

Species of gastropod

Fossarus lamellosus is a species of sea snail, a marine gastropod mollusk in the family Planaxidae.

== Distribution ==
This species occurs in the Red Sea and in the Indian Ocean off the Aldabra Atoll.
