= Constantia (gastropod) =

Scientific classification
- Kingdom: Animalia
- Phylum: Mollusca
- Class: Gastropoda
- Subclass: Caenogastropoda
- Order: Littorinimorpha
- Family: Vanikoridae
- Genus: Constantia; A. Adams, 1860

Synonyms
- Scala (Constantia) A. Adams, 1860; Scalaria (Constantia) A. Adams, 1860

Genus of gastropods

Constantia is a genus of extremely small sea snails, marine gastropod mollusks or micromollusks in the family Vanikoridae.

== General characteristics ==
(Original description in Latin) The shell is sharply pointed at one end and oval, with a narrow umbilical fissure, and possesses an elevated and attenuated spire. The whorls are rounded, with the body whorl being ventricose. The surface is decussate with fine longitudinal folds and elevated transverse spiral ridges. The aperture is oval, being longer than wide. The peristome is free and continuous, with a margin that is entire and sharp.

== Species ==
Species within the genus Constantia include:

- Constantia acutocostata Bandel & Kowalke, 1997
- Constantia elegans A. Adams, 1860
- Constantia standeni (Melvill, 1899)
- Constantia tantilla A. Adams, 1861
