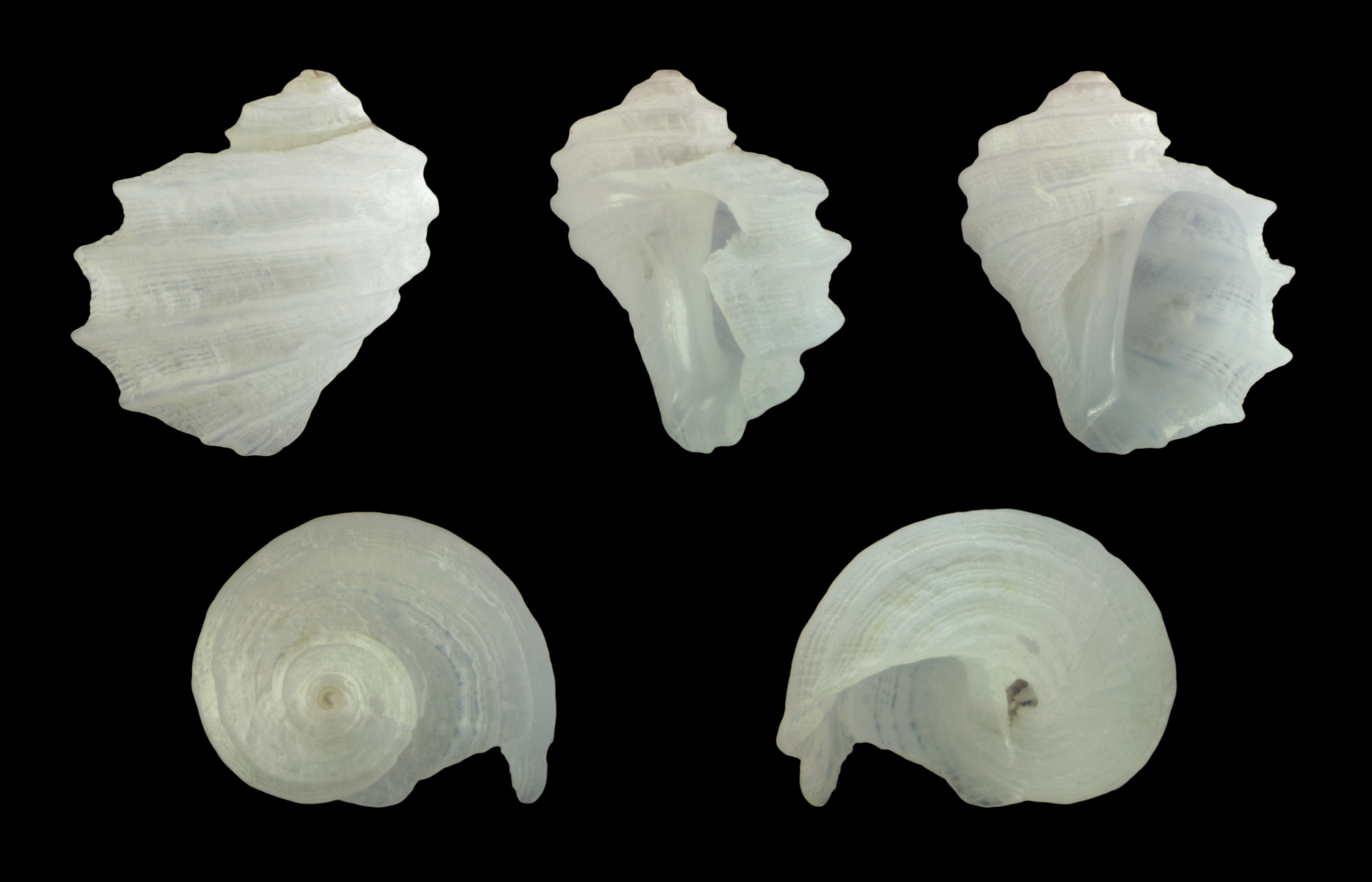

Scientific classification
- Kingdom: Animalia
- Phylum: Mollusca
- Class: Gastropoda
- Subclass: Caenogastropoda
- Order: incertae sedis
- Family: Planaxidae
- Genus: Fossarus
- Species: F. ambiguus

Binomial name
- Fossarus ambiguus (Linnaeus, 1758)

= Fossarus ambiguus =

Species of gastropod

Fossarus ambiguus is a species of sea snail, a marine gastropod mollusk in the family Planaxidae.

== Description ==
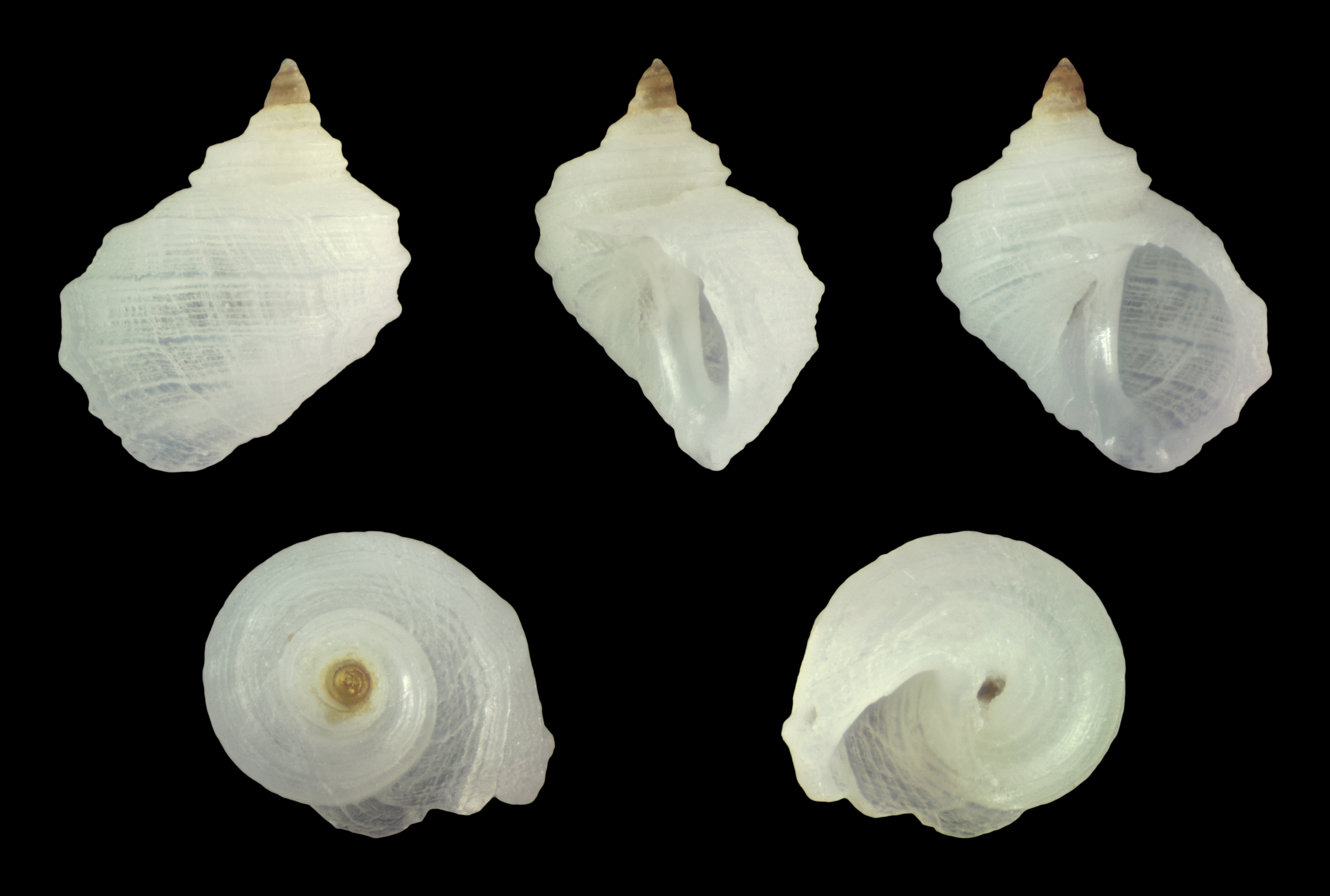
Juvenile

The maximum recorded shell length is 3.5 mm.

== Habitat ==
Minimum recorded depth is 0 m. Maximum recorded depth is 40 m.
