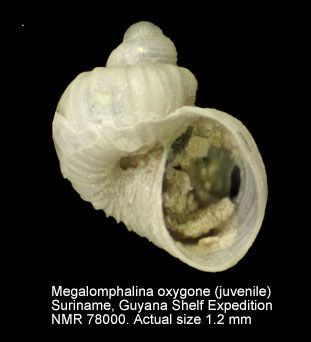
- Megalomphalus oxychone

Scientific classification
- Kingdom: Animalia
- Phylum: Mollusca
- Class: Gastropoda
- Subclass: Caenogastropoda
- Order: Littorinimorpha
- Family: Vanikoridae
- Genus: Megalomphalus; Brusina, 1871

Synonyms
- † Gyrodes (Gyrdisca) Dall, 1896 junior subjective synonym; † Gyrodisca Dall, 1896 junior subjective synonym; Macromphalus (Megalomphalus) Brusina, 1871

= Megalomphalus =

Genus of gastropods

Megalomphalus is a genus of very small sea snails, marine gastropod mollusks in the family Vanikoridae.

== Species ==
Species within the genus Megalomphalus include:

- Megalomphalus azoneus (Brusina, 1865)
- Megalomphalus californicus (Dall, 1903)
- Megalomphalus caro Dall, 1927
- Megalomphalus jousseaumei E. Lamy, 1939
- Megalomphalus lamellosus (d'Orbigny, 1842)
- Megalomphalus margaritae Rolán & Rubio, 1998
- Megalomphalus millerae (Usticke, 1959)
- Megalomphalus mosselensis Barnard, 1957
- Megalomphalus oxychone (Mörch, 1877)
- Megalomphalus petitianus (Tiberi, 1869)
- Megalomphalus pilsbryi (Olsson & McGinty, 1958)
- Megalomphalus ronaldi Segers, Swinnen & De Prins, 2009
- Megalomphalus schmiederi McLean, 1996
- Megalomphalus serus Rolán & Rubio, 1999
- Megalomphalus superbus Poppe & Tagaro, 2026
- Megalomphalus troudei (Bavay, 1908)
- Megalomphalus yoidanyi Fr. Giusti, Nappo & Pagli, 2018

Synonyms

- Megalomphalus disciformis (Granata-Grillo, 1877): synonym of Megalomphalus azoneus (Brusina, 1865) (junior subjective synonym)
- Megalomphalus mercatoris Adam & Knudsen, 1969 accepted as Megalomphalus disciformis (Granata-Grillo, 1877)
- Megalomphalus seguenzai Cossmann, 1918 accepted as Megalomphalus disciformis (Granata-Grillo, 1877)
