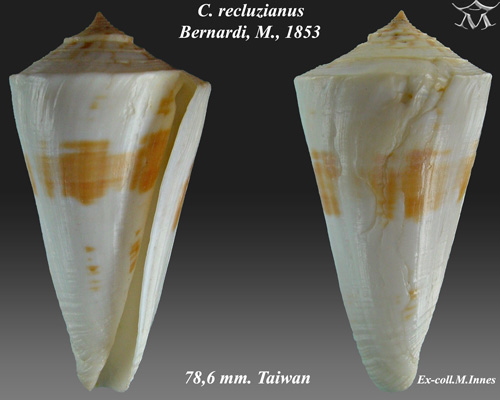
- Apertural and abapertural views of shell of Conus recluzianus Bernardi, M., 1853

Conservation status
- Least Concern (IUCN 3.1)

Scientific classification
- Domain: Eukaryota
- Kingdom: Animalia
- Phylum: Mollusca
- Class: Gastropoda
- Subclass: Caenogastropoda
- Order: Neogastropoda
- Superfamily: Conoidea
- Family: Conidae
- Genus: Conus
- Species: C. recluzianus

Binomial name
- Conus recluzianus Bernardi, 1853

Synonyms
- Conus (Splinoconus) recluzianus Bernardi, 1853 · accepted, alternate representation; Kioconus recluzianus (Bernardi, 1853); Leptoconus recluzianus Röckel, D., Korn, W. & Kohn, A.J. 1995

= Conus recluzianus =

Species of sea snail

Conus recluzianus, common name the Récluz cone, is a species of sea snail, a marine gastropod mollusk in the family Conidae, the cone snails and their allies.

Like all species within the genus Conus, these snails are predatory and venomous. They are capable of stinging humans, therefore live ones should be handled carefully or not at all.

== Subspecies ==
- Conus recluzianus recluzianus Bernardi, 1853
- Conus recluzianus simanoki Tenorio, Poppe & Tagaro, 2007

== Description ==
The size of the shell varies between 45 mm and 100 mm. The color of the shell is yellowish white, with irregular broad yellowish brown bands and spots.

== Distribution ==
This marine species occurs off Japan and Australia (Northern Territory, Queensland and Western Australia]

== Gallery ==
Conus recluzianus simanoki

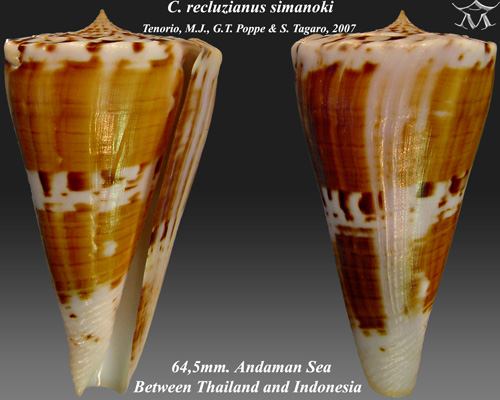
Conus recluzianus simanoki Tenorio, M.J., G.T. Poppe & S. Tagaro, 2007

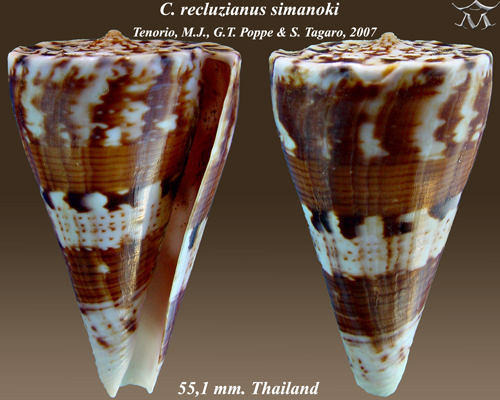
Conus recluzianus simanoki Tenorio, M.J., G.T. Poppe & S. Tagaro, 2007
