= Fossarus elegans =

Scientific classification
- Kingdom: Animalia
- Phylum: Mollusca
- Class: Gastropoda
- Subclass: Caenogastropoda
- Order: incertae sedis
- Family: Planaxidae
- Genus: Fossarus
- Species: F. elegans

Binomial name
- Fossarus elegans Verrill & Smith, 1882

Species of gastropod

Fossarus elegans is a species of sea snail, a marine gastropod mollusk in the family Planaxidae.

== Description ==
The maximum recorded shell length is 5.3 mm.

== Habitat ==
Minimum recorded depth is 128 m. Maximum recorded depth is 260 m.
