= César Auguste Récluz =

French malacologist (1799-1873)

César Auguste Récluz (17 March 1799 in Agde – 11 July 1873 in Paris) was a French malacologist.

He worked as a pharmacist in Vaugirard; as an amateur malacologist, he specialized in the family Neritidae, of which he described approximately 200 species. Much of his conchology collection was acquired by Jules Paul Benjamin Delessert.

In 1853 Sauveur Abel Aubert Petit de la Saussaye named the sea snail genus Recluzia in his honour. He also has several species named after him; examples being Conus recluzianus, Polinices reclusianus, Paramya recluzi, and Glossaulax reclusiana.

== Works ==
- Description de quelques nouvelles espéces de nérites vivantes, Revue zoologique, 1841, p. 102-109
- Prodrome d'une monographie du genre Erycine, 1844.
- Monographie du genre Narica, 1845.
- Mélanges Malacologiques, 1859.
