= Vanikoridae =

Scientific classification
- Kingdom: Animalia
- Phylum: Mollusca
- Class: Gastropoda
- Subclass: Caenogastropoda
- Order: Littorinimorpha
- Superfamily: Vanikoroidea
- Family: Vanikoridae; J. E. Gray, 1840

Genera
- See text

Synonyms
- Caledoniellidae; Merriidae; Naricidae

Family of gastropods

Vanikoridae is a family of small to medium-sized sea snails, marine gastropod molluscs in the superfamily Vanikoroidea.

== Genera ==
Genera within the family Vanikoridae include:

- Amamiconcha Habe, 1961
- Berthais Melvill, 1904
- Caledoniella Souverbie, 1869
- Constantia A. Adams, 1860
- † Cymenorytis Cossmann, 1888
- Fossarella Thiele, 1925
- Japanonoba Habe & Ando, 1987
- † Kaawatina Bartrum & Powell, 1928
- Larsenia Warén, 1989
- Macromphalina Cossmann, 1888
- Macromphalus S. V. Wood, 1842
- Megalomphalus Brusina, 1871
- Naricava Hedley, 1913
- Nilsia Finlay, 1926
- Radinista Finlay, 1926
- Stenotis A. Adams, 1863
- Talassia Warén & Bouchet, 1988
- Tropidorbis Iredale, 1936
- Tubiola A. Adams, 1863
- Vanikoro J.R.C. Quoy & J.P. Gaimard, 1832
- Zeradina Finlay, 1926

Genera brought into synonymy

- Chonebasis Pilsbry & Olsson, 1945: synonym of Macromphalina Cossmann, 1888
- Couthouyia A. Adams, 1860: synonym of Macromphalus S.V. Wood, 1842
- Epistethe Preston, 1912: synonym of Caledoniella Souverbie, 1869
- Gyrodisca Dall, 1896: synonym of Megalomphalus Brusina, 1871
- Korovina Iredale, 1918: synonym of Vanikoro Quoy & Gaimard, 1832
- Leucotis Swainson, 1840: synonym of Vanikoro Quoy & Gaimard, 1832
- Merria Gray, 1839: synonym of Vanikoro Quoy & Gaimard, 1832
- Narica d'Orbigny, 1842: synonym of Vanikoro Quoy & Gaimard, 1832
