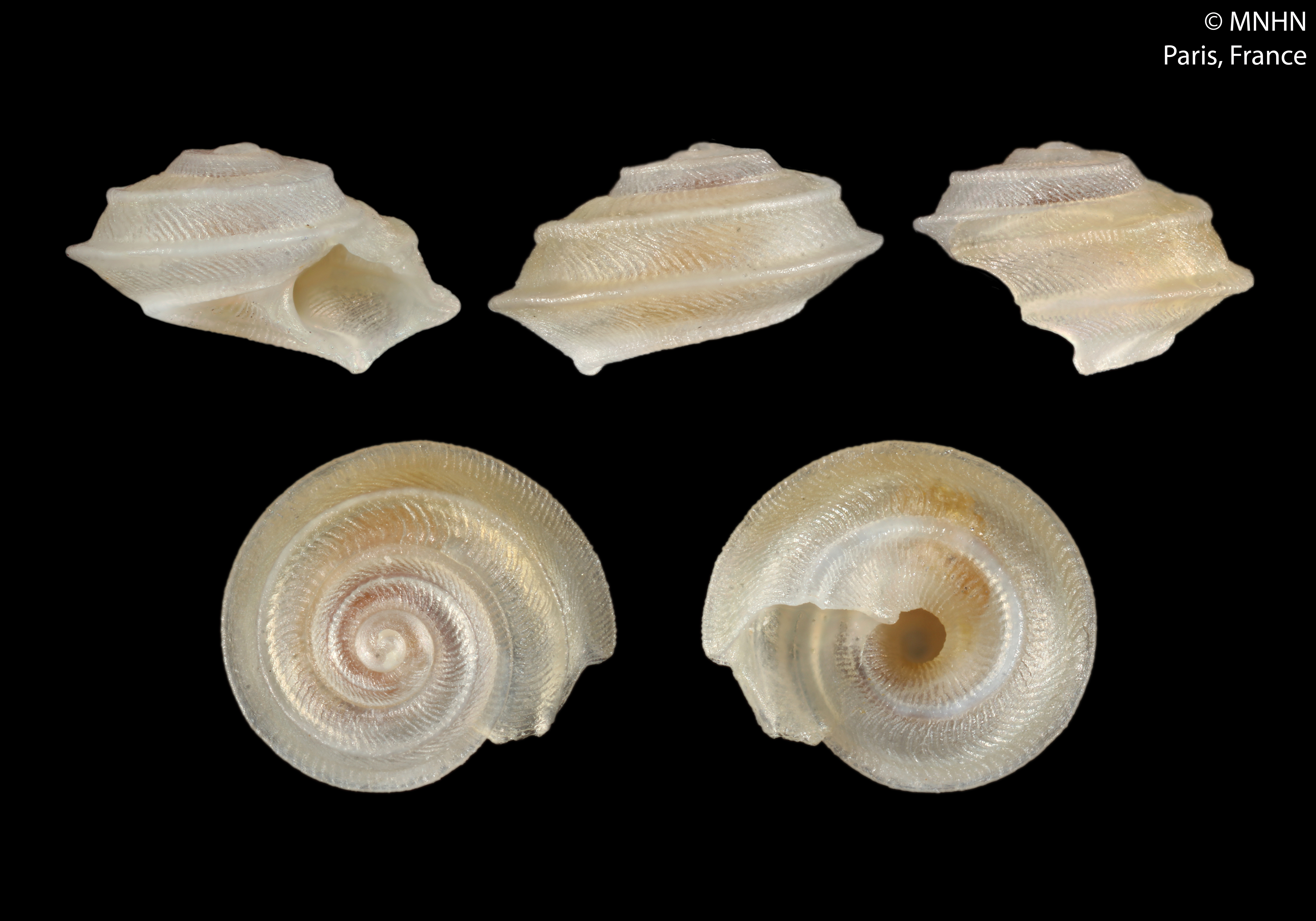
- Shell of Cyclostremiscus albachiarae (holotype at MNHN, Paris)

Scientific classification
- Kingdom: Animalia
- Phylum: Mollusca
- Class: Gastropoda
- Subclass: Caenogastropoda
- Order: Littorinimorpha
- Family: Tornidae
- Genus: Cyclostremiscus; Pilsbry & Olsson, 1945

Type species
- Vitrinella panamensis C. B. Adams, 1852

Synonyms
- Miralabrum Pilsbry & Olsson, 1945; Ponocyclus Pilsbry, 1953

= Cyclostremiscus =

Genus of gastropods

Cyclostremiscus is a genus of small sea snails in the family Tornidae.

== Taxonomy ==
Rolán & Rubio (2002: 46) hold Discopsis as a valid genus, distinct from Cochliolepis Stimpson, 1858, on the grounds that the latter belongs in the family Vitrinellidae and the former in Tornidae. This should be reevaluated in the perspective that both families are considered synonyms. Adam & Knudsen (1969) may have been right in placing the West African species in Cochliolepis.

== Species ==
Species within the genus Cyclostremiscus include:

- Cyclostremiscus adamsi Pilsbry & Olsson, 1945
- Cyclostremiscus albachiarae Perugia, 2015
- Cyclostremiscus anceps (Laws, 1941) †
- Cyclostremiscus anxius (Hedley, 1909)
- Cyclostremiscus azuerensis Pilsbry & Olsson, 1952
- Cyclostremiscus bailyi (Hertlein & A. M. Strong, 1951)
- Cyclostremiscus balboa Pilsbry & Olsson, 1945
- Cyclostremiscus baldridgae (Bartsch, 1911)
- Cyclostremiscus bartschi (Mansfield, 1936)
- Cyclostremiscus beauii (P. Fischer, 1857)
- Cyclostremiscus bifrontia (Carpenter, 1857)
- Cyclostremiscus calameli (Jousseaume, 1872)
- Cyclostremiscus cerrosensis (Bartsch, 1907)
- Cyclostremiscus colombianus Pilsbry & Olsson, 1945
- Cyclostremiscus coronatus (Carpenter, 1857)
- Cyclostremiscus cubanus (Pilsbry & Aguayo, 1933)
- Cyclostremiscus dalli (Bush, 1897)
- Cyclostremiscus diminutus Rubio, Rolán & Pelorce, 2011
- Cyclostremiscus diomedeae (Bartsch, 1911)
- Cyclostremiscus euglyptus Aguayo & Borro, 1946
- Cyclostremiscus exigua (C. B. Adams, 1852)
- Cyclostremiscus gallo Pilsbry & Olsson, 1945
- Cyclostremiscus glyptobasis Pilsbry & Olsson, 1952 †
- Cyclostremiscus glyptomphalus Pilsbry & Olsson, 1952 †
- Cyclostremiscus gordanus (Hertlein & A. M. Strong, 1951)
- Cyclostremiscus hendersoni (Dall, 1927)
- Cyclostremiscus janus (C. B. Adams, 1852)
- Cyclostremiscus jeannae Pilsbry & McGinty, 1946
- Cyclostremiscus lirulatus (Carpenter, 1857)
- Cyclostremiscus lowei (F. Baker, Hanna & A. M. Strong, 1938)
- Cyclostremiscus madreensis (F. Baker, Hanna & A. M. Strong, 1938)
- Cyclostremiscus major Olsson & M. Smith, 1952
- Cyclostremiscus microstriatus Rubio, Rolán & H. G. Lee, 2011
- Cyclostremiscus mohicanus Simone, 2012
- Cyclostremiscus multiliratus Rubio, Rolán & Garcia, 2011
- Cyclostremiscus nodiferus Pilsbry & Olsson, 1952
- Cyclostremiscus nodosus (Carpenter, 1857)
- Cyclostremiscus nummus Pilsbry & Olsson, 1952
- Cyclostremiscus pachynepion Pilsbry & Olsson, 1945
- Cyclostremiscus panamensis (C. B. Adams, 1852)
- Cyclostremiscus parvus (C. B. Adams, 1852)
- Cyclostremiscus pauli Pilsbry & Olsson, 1952
- Cyclostremiscus pentagonus (Gabb, 1873)
- Cyclostremiscus perparvus (C. B. Adams, 1852)
- Cyclostremiscus peruvianus Pilsbry & Olsson, 1945
- Cyclostremiscus planospira Pilsbry & Olsson, 1945
- Cyclostremiscus planospiratus (Carpenter, 1857)
- Cyclostremiscus psix Pilsbry & Olsson, 1952
- Cyclostremiscus spiceri (F. Baker, Hanna & A. M. Strong, 1938)
- Cyclostremiscus spiritualis (F. Baker, Hanna & A. M. Strong, 1938)
- Cyclostremiscus suppressus (Dall, 1889)
- Cyclostremiscus taigai (Hertlein & A. M. Strong, 1951)
- Cyclostremiscus tenuisculptus (Carpenter, 1864)
- Cyclostremiscus tricarinatus (C. B. Adams, 1852)
- Cyclostremiscus trigonatus (Carpenter, 1857)
- Cyclostremiscus trilix (Bush, 1885)
- Cyclostremiscus unicornis (Pilsbry & Olsson, 1945)
- Cyclostremiscus valvatoides (C. B. Adams, 1852)
- Cyclostremiscus vanbruggeni De Jong & Coomans, 1988
- Cyclostremiscus veleronis (A. M. Strong & Hertlein, 1947)
- Cyclostremiscus verreauxii (P. Fischer, 1857)
- Cyclostremiscus xantusi (Bartsch, 1907)l end

Species brought into synonymy

- Cyclostremiscus anxium [sic] : synonym of Cyclostremiscus anxius (Hedley, 1909) (incorrect gender ending)
- Cyclostremiscus baldridgei [sic] : synonym of Cyclostremiscus baldridgae (Bartsch, 1911) (misspelling)
- Cyclostremiscus bartschi Pilsbry & Olsson, 1945 : synonym of Cyclostremiscus pauli Pilsbry & Olsson, 1952 (invalid: junior homonym of Cyclostremiscus bartschi Hertlein & Strong, 1939; C. pauli is a replacement name)
- Cyclostremiscus bartschi A. M. Strong & Hertlein, 1939 : synonym of Cyclostremiscus veleronis (A. M. Strong & Hertlein, 1947) (secondary homonym of Cyclostrema bartschi Mansfield, 1936; C. veleronis is a replacement name)
- Cyclostremiscus bermudezi Aguayo & Borro, 1946 : synonym of Orbitestella bermudezi (Aguayo & Borro, 1946)
- Cyclostremiscus caraboboensis Weisbord, 1962 : synonym of Tornus caraboboensis (Weisbord, 1962) (original combination)
- Cyclostremiscus cosmius (Bartsch, 1907) : synonym of Circulus cosmius Bartsch, 1907
- Cyclostremiscus crassilabris Aguayo & Borro, 1946 : synonym of Anticlimax crassilabris (Aguayo & Borro, 1946) (original combination)
- Cyclostremiscus dariae Liuzzi & Zucchi Stolfa, 1979 : synonym of Orbitestella dariae (Liuzzi & Zucchi Stolfa, 1979)
- Cyclostremiscus emeryi Ladd, 1966 : synonym of Lodderena emeryi (Ladd, 1966)
- Cyclostremiscus novemcarinatus (Melvill, 1906) : synonym of Lodderia novemcarinata (Melvill, 1906) : synonym of Circulus novemcarinatus (Melvill, 1906)
- Cyclostremiscus ornatus Olsson & McGinty, 1958 : synonym of Lodderena ornata (Olsson & McGinty, 1958) (original combination)
- Cyclostremiscus pulchellus Olsson & McGinty, 1958 : synonym of Lodderena pulchella (Olsson & McGinty, 1958) (original combination)
- Cyclostremiscus schrammii (P. Fischer, 1857) : synonym of Tornus schrammii (P. Fischer, 1857)
- Cyclostremiscus solitarius Hertlein & Allison, 1968 : synonym of Lodderena ornata (Olsson & McGinty, 1958)
- Cyclostremiscus striatus Kay, 1979 : synonym of Lodderena striata (Kay, 1979) (original combination)
