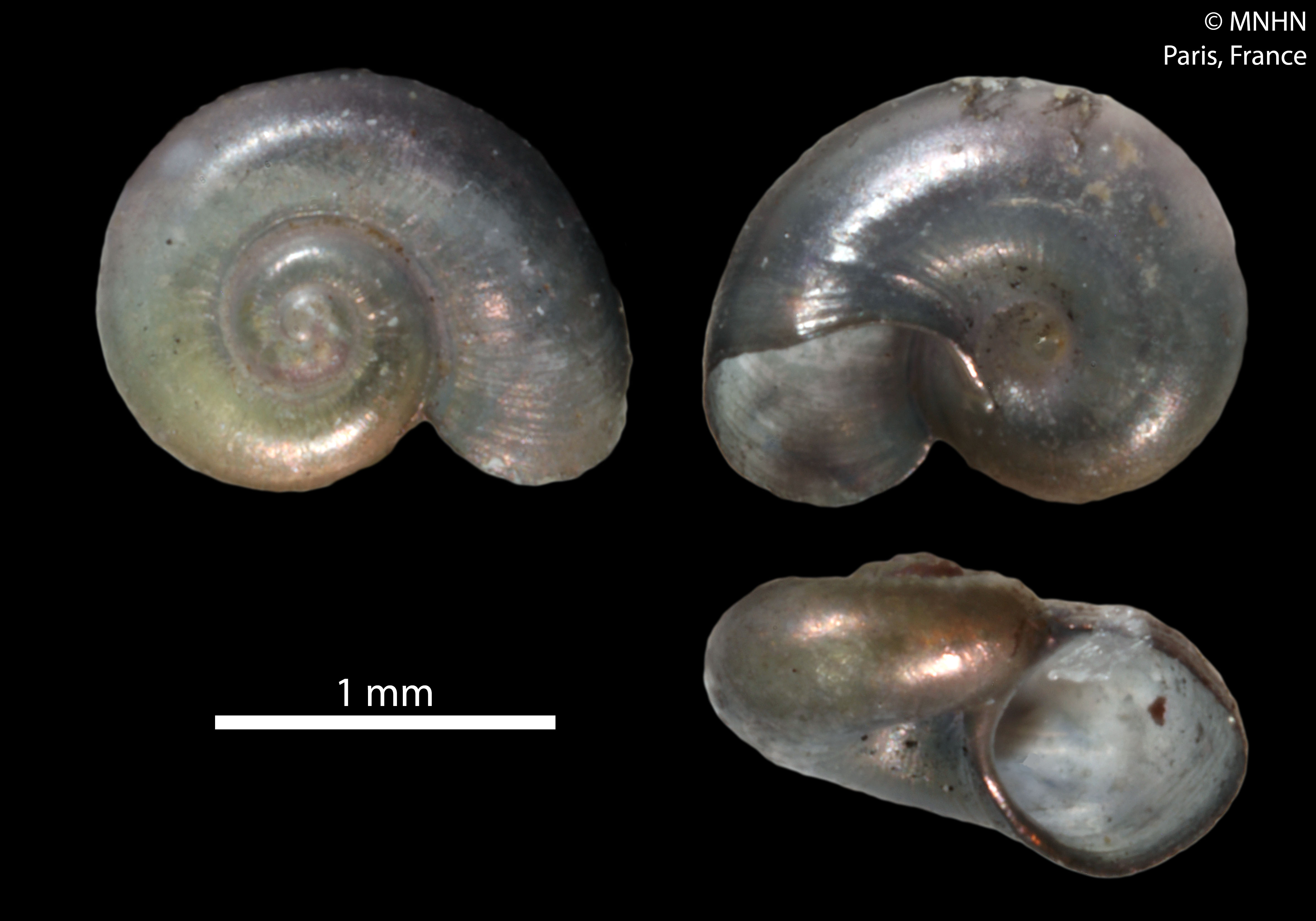
- Shell of Vitrinella canaliculata (paratype at MNHN, Paris)

Scientific classification
- Kingdom: Animalia
- Phylum: Mollusca
- Class: Gastropoda
- Subclass: Caenogastropoda
- Order: Littorinimorpha
- Superfamily: Truncatelloidea
- Family: Vitrinellidae
- Genus: Vitrinella; C. B. Adams, 1850

Type species
- Vitrinella helicoidea C.B.Adams, 1850

Synonyms
- Vitrinella (Docomphala) Bartsch, 1907 alternate representation; Vitrinella (Vitrinellops) Pilsbry & Olsson, 1952 · alternate representation

= Vitrinella =

Genus of gastropods

Vitrinella is a genus of minute sea snails, marine gastropod mollusks or micromollusks in the family Vitrinellidae.

== Distribution ==
This marine genus occurs off Gulf of Oman, New Caledonia, Fiji, Indonesia, Japan, the Philippines, Singapore and Australia (New South Wales, Northern Territory, Queensland, South Australia and Victoria)

== Species ==
- Vitrinella acutecarinata Thiele, 1925
- Vitrinella aguayoi (Corgan, 1968)
- Vitrinella anneliesae De Jong & Coomans, 1988
- Vitrinella annulifera (Dautzenberg, 1910)
- Vitrinella anomala (d'Orbigny, 1842)
- Vitrinella aristata Rubio, Fernández-Garcés & Rolán, 2011
- Vitrinella assimilis Thiele, 1925
- Vitrinella berryi Bartsch, 1907
- Vitrinella bifilata Carpenter, 1857
- Vitrinella bushi Dautzenberg, 1912
- Vitrinella calliglypta Aguayo, 1949
- Vitrinella campylochila Pilsbry & Olsson, 1952
- Vitrinella canaliculata Rubio, Fernández-Garcés & Rolán, 2011
- Vitrinella caperata (Tate, 1899)
- Vitrinella columbiana Bartsch, 1921
- Vitrinella contracta (Vanatta, 1913)
- Vitrinella cupidinensis Van Regteren Altena, 1966
- Vitrinella dalli (Bartsch, 1911)
- Vitrinella eshnaurae Bartsch, 1907
- Vitrinella facira Bartsch, 1915
- Vitrinella ficara Bartsch, 1915
- Vitrinella filifera Pilsbry & McGinty, 1946
- Vitrinella floridana Pilsbry & McGinty, 1946
- Vitrinella fortaxis Pilsbry & Olsson, 1952
- Vitrinella funiculus (Dall, 1892)
- Vitrinella goniomphala Pilsbry & Olsson, 1952
- Vitrinella guaymasensis Durham, 1942
- Vitrinella heliciformis Thiele, 1925
- Vitrinella helicoidea C. B. Adams, 1850
- Vitrinella hellwegei Thiele, 1925
- Vitrinella hemphilli Vanatta, 1913
- Vitrinella humilis Thiele, 1925
- Vitrinella inconspicua Thiele, 1925
- † Vitrinella inopinata Lozouet & Maestrati, 1982 †
- Vitrinella kaykayae Rolán & Sellanes, 2004
- Vitrinella lucasana (Baker, Hanna & Strong, 1938)
- Vitrinella magister Pilsbry & Olsson, 1952
- Vitrinella margarita Pilsbry & Olsson, 1952
- Vitrinella martensiana (Hertlein & Strong, 1951)
- Vitrinella modesta C. B. Adams, 1852
- † Vitrinella molengraaffi van Regteren Altena, 1938
- Vitrinella multilirata Thiele, 1925
- Vitrinella multispiralis Pilsbry & Olsson, 1952
- Vitrinella naticoides Carpenter, 1857
- Vitrinella oldroydi Bartsch, 1907
- † Vitrinella opsitelotus (Dall, 1892)
- Vitrinella orientalis Thiele, 1925
- Vitrinella pelorcei Rubio, Fernández-Garcés & Rolán, 2011
- Vitrinella politurae Rolán & Rubio, 1999
- Vitrinella ponceliana de Folin, 1867
- Vitrinella proxima Pilsbry & Olsson, 1952
- Vitrinella pseudoaristata Rubio, Fernández-Garcés & Rolán, 2011
- Vitrinella pusilla (L. Pfeiffer, 1840)
- Vitrinella schoedei Thiele, 1925
- Vitrinella simplex Thiele, 1925
- Vitrinella smithi Bartsch, 1927
- Vitrinella solaris Rubio, Fernández-Garcés & Rolán, 2011
- Vitrinella stearnsi Bartsch, 1907
- Vitrinella stephensae (Baker, Hanna & Strong, 1938)
- Vitrinella subquadrata Carpenter, 1857
- Vitrinella sumatrensis Thiele, 1925
- Vitrinella sundaica Thiele, 1925
- Vitrinella tiburonensis Durham, 1942
- Vitrinella tryoni Bush, 1897
- Vitrinella vesta (Hedley, 1901)
- Vitrinella williamsoni Dall, 1892
- Vitrinella zonitoides (Hertlein & Strong, 1952)

Species brought into synonymy

- Vitrinella (Docomphala) arifca Bartsch, 1915: synonym of Lodderena arifca (Bartsch, 1915)
- subgenus Vitrinella (Striovitrinella) Olsson & McGinty, 1958: synonym of Solariorbis Conrad, 1865
- Vitrinella agulhasensis Thiele, 1925: synonym of Parviturbo agulhasensis (Thiele, 1925)
- Vitrinella alaskensis Bartsch, 1907: synonym of Rissoella alaskensis (Bartsch, 1907)
- Vitrinella bicaudata Pilsbry & McGinty, 1946: synonym of Tomura bicaudata (Pilsbry & McGinty, 1946)
- Vitrinella blakei Rehder, 1944: synonym of Solariorbis blakei (Rehder, 1944)
- Vitrinella cerion Dall, 1927: synonym of Mikro cerion (Dall, 1927)
- Vitrinella congoensis Thiele, 1925: synonym of Circulus congoensis (Thiele, 1925)
- Vitrinella diaphana (d'Orbigny, 1842): synonym of Vitrinella pusilla (L. Pfeiffer, 1840)
- Vitrinella elegans Olsson & McGinty, 1958: synonym of Solariorbis elegans (Olsson & McGinty, 1958)
- Vitrinella georgiana Dall, 1927: synonym of Cirsonella georgiana (Dall, 1927)
- Vitrinella holmesii Dall, 1889: synonym of Cochliolepis holmesii (Dall, 1889)
- Vitrinella inclinans Barnard, 1963: synonym of Skenea inclinans (Barnard, 1963)
- Vitrinella interrupta C. B. Adams, 1850: synonym of Parviturboides interruptus (C. B. Adams, 1850)
- Vitrinella megastoma C. B. Adams, 1850: synonym of Teinostoma megastoma (C. B. Adams, 1850)
- Vitrinella mooreana Vanatta, 1904: synonym of Solariorbis mooreanus (Vanatta, 1904)
- Vitrinella multicarinata Dall, 1889: synonym of Episcynia multicarinata (Dall, 1889)
- Vitrinella novemcarinata (Melvill, 1906): synonym of Lodderia novemcarinata (Melvill, 1906)
- Vitrinella panamensis C. B. Adams, 1852: synonym of Cyclostremiscus panamensis (C. B. Adams, 1852)
- Vitrinella praecox Pilsbry & McGinty, 1946: synonym of Vitrinella helicoidea C. B. Adams, 1850
- Vitrinella prominula (A. Adams, 1861): synonym of Tornus prominulus (A. Adams, 1861)
- Vitrinella rhyssa Dall, 1927: synonym of Xyloskenea rhyssa (Dall, 1927)
- Vitrinella sculptilis Garrett, 1873: synonym of Circulus sculptilis (Garrett, 1873)
- Vitrinella semisculpta Olsson & McGinty, 1958: synonym of Circulus semisculptus (Olsson & McGinty, 1958)
- Vitrinella tenuisculpta Aguayo & Borro, 1946: synonym of Vitrinella aguayoi (Corgan, 1968)
- Vitrinella terminalis Pilsbry & McGinty, 1946: synonym of Solariorbis terminalis (Pilsbry & McGinty, 1946)
- Vitrinella texana D. R. Moore, 1965: synonym of Circulus texanus (D. R. Moore, 1965)
- † Vitrinella truncata Gabb, 1881: synonym of Solariorbis truncatus (Gabb, 1881)
- Vitrinella urdunica Bandel, 2010: synonym of Tomura urdunica (Bandel, 2010)
- Vitrinella valvatoides C. B. Adams, 1852: synonym of Cyclostremiscus valvatoides (C. B. Adams, 1852)

Taxa inquirenda

- Vitrinella carinifex Dall, 1927
- Vitrinella massarita Dall, 1927

Nomine dubia

- Vitrinella carinata (d'Orbigny, 1842)
- Vitrinella cyclostomoides (Pfeiffer, 1840)
- Vitrinella hyalina C. B. Adams, 1850
- Vitrinella tincta C. B. Adams, 1850
