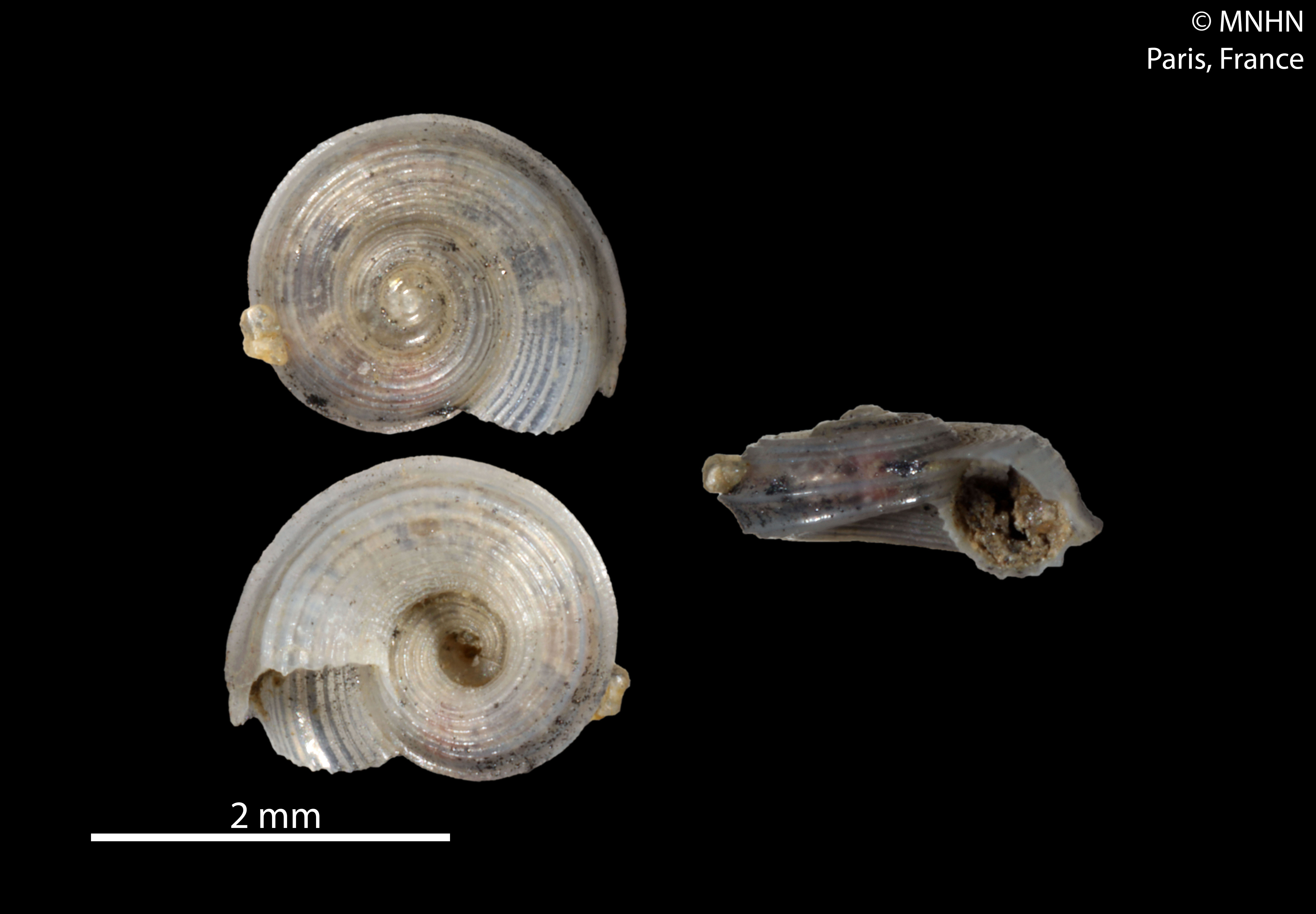
- Shell of Circulus ryalli (paratype at MNHN, Paris)

Scientific classification
- Kingdom: Animalia
- Phylum: Mollusca
- Class: Gastropoda
- Subclass: Caenogastropoda
- Order: Littorinimorpha
- Superfamily: Truncatelloidea
- Family: Vitrinellidae
- Genus: Circulus; Jeffreys, 1865

Type species
- Delphinula duminyi Requien, 1848

Synonyms
- Circlotoma Laseron, 1958; Circulus (Circulus) Jeffreys, 1865; Cyclostrema (Lydiphnis) Melvill, 1906 junior subjective synonym (original combination); Elachorbis Iredale, 1915; Lydiphnis Melvill, 1906 junior subjective synonym; Lydiphnis (Cymatopteryx) Pilsbry & Olssen, 1946 junior subjective synonym; Lydiphnis (Mesopteryx) Pilsbry & Olssen, 1945 junior homonym (of Mesopteryx Saussure, 1870 (Orthoptera ); Pygmaeorota Kuroda & Habe, 1954; † Pygmaeorota (Lydiphnopsis) Shuto, 1969 junior subjective synonym; Pygmaeorota (Pygmaeorota) Kuroda & Habe, 1954; Pygmaeorota (Soyorota) Habe, 1961; Pygmaerota Kuroda & Habe, 1952 (nude name); Soyorota Habe, 1961; Trochus (Circulus) Jeffreys, 1865 (original rank); Vitrinella (Lydiphnis) Melvill, 1906

= Circulus (gastropod) =

Genus of gastropods

Circulus is a genus of very small and minute sea snails with an operculum, marine gastropod mollusks in the family Vitrinellidae.

== Species ==
According to the World Register of Marine Species (WoRMS), the following species with valid names are included within the genus Circulus

- Circulus abruptus Rubio & Rolán, 2022
- Circulus acuteliratus (Thiele, 1925)
- Circulus adrianrubioi Rubio & Rolán, 2022
- Circulus aemilii Rubio & Gofas, 2024
- Circulus aequatorialis (Thiele, 1925)
- Circulus alcocerae Rubio & Rolán, 2022
- Circulus andreae Rubio & Rolán, 2022
- Circulus andreiasalvadorae Rubio & Rolán, 2022
- Circulus angulatus (A. Adams, 1850)
- Circulus antoniae Rubio & Rolán, 2022
- Circulus asperRubio & Rolán, 2022
- Circulus austerus Rubio & Rolán, 2022
- Circulus australesensisRubio & Rolán, 2022
- Circulus aximicrostriatus Rubio & Rolán, 2022
- Circulus basislevis Rubio & Rolán, 2022
- † Circulus bicarinatus (Lamarck, 1804)
- Circulus binodular Rubio & Rolán, 2022
- Circulus biporcatus (A. Adams, 1863)
- † Circulus bonneti (Cossmann, 1907)
- Circulus boucheti Rubio & Rolán, 2022
- Circulus cachoi Rubio & Rolán, 2022
- Circulus caledonicus Rubio & Rolán, 2022
- Circulus carinamagna Rubio & Rolán, 2022
- Circulus carmensalasae Rubio & Rolán, 2022
- Circulus catenatus Rubio & Rolán, 2022
- Circulus chefyae Rubio & Rolán, 2022
- Circulus choshiensis (Habe, 1961)
- Circulus cinguliferus (A. Adams, 1850)
- Circulus colluvius Rubio & Rolán, 2022
- Circulus communis Rubio & Rolán, 2022
- Circulus congoensis (Thiele, 1925)
- Circulus convexstriatus Rubio & Rolán, 2022
- Circulus convexus Rubio & Rolán, 2022
- Circulus coronatus Rubio & Rolán, 2022
- Circulus cosmius Bartsch, 1907
- Circulus cuatricarinatus Rubio & Rolán, 2022
- Circulus cultrorum Rubio & Rolán, 2022
- Circulus cumtectum Rubio & Rolán, 2022
- Circulus cycloma (Barnard, 1964)
- Circulus davidruedai Rubio & Rolán, 2022
- Circulus decemcords Rubio & Rolán, 2022
- Circulus delectabilis (Tate, 1899)
- Circulus delicatus Rubio & Rolán, 2022
- Circulus depressus Rubio & Rolán, 2022
- Circulus deprinsi Rolán & Swinnen, 2013
- Circulus diaphanus (Finlay, 1924)
- Circulus discordant Rubio & Rolán, 2022
- Circulus discretus Rubio & Rolán, 2022
- Circulus dispersus Rubio & Rolán, 2022
- † Circulus duplicarinus (Marwick, 1929)
- Circulus duplicatus (Lischke, 1872)
- † Circulus edomitus (Marwick, 1931)
- Circulus ellenstrongae Rubio & Rolán, 2022
- † Circulus enaulus Lozouet, 1998
- † Circulus estotensis Lozouet, 1998
- Circulus euchilopteron (Melvill & Standen, 1903)
- Circulus excellent Rubio & Rolán, 2022
- Circulus exempli Rubio & Rolán, 2022
- Circulus extensus Rubio & Rolán, 2022
- Circulus fijiensis Rubio & Rolán, 2022
- Circulus fininspicor Rubio & Rolán, 2022
- Circulus fundatus Rubio & Rolán, 2022
- Circulus gofasi Rubio & Rolán, 2022
- Circulus gracilis Rubio & Rolán, 2022
- † Circulus grignonensis (Deshayes, 1864)
- Circulus gyalum (Melvill, 1904)
- Circulus harriettae (Petterd, 1884)
- Circulus harrietwoodae Rubio & Rolán, 2022
- Circulus hasegawai Rubio & Rolán, 2022
- † Circulus helicoides (Hutton, 1877)
- Circulus horroi Rubio & Rolán, 2022
- Circulus inchoatus Rubio & Rolán, 2022
- Circulus inesae Rubio & Rolán, 2022
- † Circulus inornatus P. Marshall, 1919
- † Circulus intermedius (Deshayes, 1862)
- Circulus irregularis Rubio & Rolán, 2022
- Circulus iustus Rubio & Rolán, 2022
- Circulus juanmai Rubio & Rolán, 2022
- Circulus juantrigoi Rubio & Rolán, 2022
- Circulus julioalvarezi Rubio & Rolán, 2022
- Circulus laevis (Kiener, 1838)
- Circulus lenticularis Rubio & Rolán, 2022
- Circulus letourneuxi Rubio & Rolán, 2022
- Circulus liratus (A. E. Verrill, 1882)
- Circulus liricinctus (Garrett, 1873)
- Circulus loyaltiensis Rubio & Rolán, 2022
- Circulus luciae Rubio & Rolán, 2022
- † Circulus lucidus (Cossmann, 1881)
- Circulus luquei Rubio & Rolán, 2022
- Circulus madagascarensis Rubio & Rolán, 2022
- Circulus maestrati Rubio & Rolán, 2022
- Circulus marchei (Jousseaume, 1872)
- Circulus marcosi Rubio & Rolán, 2022
- Circulus maricarmenae Rubio & Rolán, 2022
- Circulus marquesasensis Rubio & Rolán, 2022
- Circulus mayottensis Rubio & Rolán, 2022
- † Circulus megalomphalus (Cossmann, 1919)
- † Circulus michaudi (Deshayes, 1862)
- Circulus microbliquus Rubio & Rolán, 2022
- Circulus microlines Rubio & Rolán, 2022
- Circulus micronodular Rubio & Rolán, 2022
- Circulus microradiatus Rubio & Rolán, 2022
- Circulus microsculpturatus Oliver & Rolán, 2011
- Circulus microspiralis Rubio & Rolán, 2022
- Circulus microstriatus Rubio & Rolán, 2022
- Circulus microtuberculatus Rubio & Rolán, 2022
- Circulus minituber Rubio & Rolán, 2022
- Circulus minutispiralis Rubio & Rolán, 2022
- † Circulus mitis (Deshayes, 1862)
- Circulus modestus (Gould, 1859)
- Circulus monocoronatus Rubio & Rolán, 2022
- Circulus monteiroi Rubio & Rolán, 2022
- Circulus mortoni Ponder, 1994
- Circulus mozambiquensis Rubio & Rolán, 2022
- Circulus multicordatus Rubio & Rolán, 2022
- Circulus multiradiatus Rubio & Rolán, 2022
- Circulus multistriatus Rubio & Rolán, 2022
- Circulus murilloi Rubio & Rolán, 2022
- Circulus nimis Rubio & Rolán, 2022
- † Circulus nitidus (Deshayes, 1862)
- Circulus novemcarinatus (Melvill, 1906)
- Circulus novemlicium Rubio & Rolán, 2022
- Circulus obesus Rubio & Rolán, 2022
- Circulus octoliratus (Carpenter, 1856)
- Circulus oliveri Rubio & Rolán, 2022
- Circulus operius Rubio & Rolán, 2022
- Circulus orbignyi (P. Fischer, 1857)
- Circulus ordinatus Rubio & Rolán, 2022
- Circulus osfloridum Rubio & Rolán, 2022
- Circulus osingens Rubio & Rolán, 2022
- Circulus osmagnum Rubio & Rolán, 2022
- Circulus pacomartinezi Rubio & Rolán, 2023
- Circulus pamilacanensis Rubio & Rolán, 2022
- Circulus papuaensis Rubio & Rolán, 2022
- Circulus parallelus Rubio & Rolán, 2022
- Circulus parcus Rubio & Rolán, 2022
- Circulus paucicordatus Rubio & Rolán, 2022
- † Circulus paulensis Lozouet, 1998
- Circulus pellucidus (E. A. Smith, 1910)
- Circulus penasi Rubio & Rolán, 2022
- Circulus pilartarazonae Rubio & Rolán, 2022
- Circulus pinsensis Rubio & Rolán, 2022
- Circulus planatus Rubio & Rolán, 2022
- † Circulus planorbillus (Dujardin, 1837)
- Circulus planorbis (Laseron, 1958)
- † Circulus planorbularis (Deshayes, 1832)
- Circulus pluripunctus Rubio & Rolán, 2022
- Circulus plurispiralis Rubio & Rolán, 2022
- † Circulus politus Suter, 1917 (accepted > unreplaced junior homonym, secondary homonym of Circulus politus (Morlet, 1888))
- † Circulus politus (Morlet, 1888)
- Circulus protobrevis Rubio & Rolán, 2022
- Circulus prototuber Rubio & Rolán, 2022
- Circulus proximus Rubio & Rolán, 2022
- Circulus pseudocarinatus Rubio & Rolán, 2022
- Circulus pseudopraecedens Adam & Knudsen, 1969
- Circulus pudicus Rubio & Rolán, 2022
- Circulus punctuslinealis Rubio & Rolán, 2022
- Circulus quinoneroi Rubio & Rolán, 2022
- Circulus quinquecarinatus (Melvill, 1906)
- † Circulus rangii (Deshayes, 1862)
- Circulus retroconvexus Rubio & Rolán, 2022
- Circulus reunionensis Rubio & Rolán, 2022
- Circulus robustus Rubio & Rolán, 2022
- Circulus rolanorum Rubio & Rolán, 2022
- Circulus rosapereirae Rubio & Rolán, 2022
- Circulus rosenbergi Rubio & Rolán, 2022
- Circulus rossellinus Dall, 1919
- Circulus rudis Rubio & Rolán, 2022
- Circulus rugospiralis Rubio & Rolán, 2022
- Circulus rusticulus Rubio & Rolán, 2022
- Circulus rusticus Rubio & Rolán, 2022
- Circulus ryalli Oliver & Rolán, 2011
- Circulus sandrogorii Rubio & Rolán, 2022
- Circulus scaber Rubio & Rolán, 2022
- Circulus sculptilis (Garrett, 1873)
- Circulus sculpturatus Rubio & Rolán, 2022
- Circulus semisculptus (Olsson & McGinty, 1958)
- † Circulus semistriatus (Deshayes, 1862)
- Circulus senegalensis Adam & Knudsen, 1969
- Circulus serratus Rubio & Rolán, 2022
- Circulus sexangulae Rubio & Rolán, 2022
- † Circulus sigaretornuformis Lozouet, 1998
- † Circulus similis (Deshayes, 1862)
- Circulus similiter Rubio & Rolán, 2022
- Circulus simongrovei Rubio & Rolán, 2022
- † Circulus simplex (Briart & Cornet, 1887)
- Circulus simpliciter Rubio & Rolán, 2022
- Circulus sixcarinatus Rubio & Rolán, 2022
- Circulus smithi Bush, 1897
- Circulus societyensis Rubio & Rolán, 2022
- Circulus solomonensis Rubio & Rolán, 2022
- Circulus soyoae (Habe, 1961)
- Circulus speciosus Rubio & Rolán, 2022
- Circulus spiralis Rubio & Rolán, 2022
- † Circulus spirorbis (Lamarck, 1804)
- Circulus stephani Rolán & Ryall, 2002
- Circulus striatus (Philippi, 1836)
- Circulus structus Rubio & Rolán, 2022
- Circulus suavis Rubio & Rolán, 2022
- † Circulus subcirculus (Cossmann & Peyrot, 1917)
- † Circulus subedomitus (Laws, 1936)
- Circulus subradiatus Rubio & Rolán, 2022
- Circulus subsuturalis Rubio & Rolán, 2022
- Circulus subtatei (Suter, 1907)
- Circulus sulcatus (A. Adams, 1850)
- Circulus supranitidus (Wood S., 1848)
- Circulus susomendezi Rubio & Rolán, 2022
- Circulus suspensus Rubio & Rolán, 2022
- Circulus suturcaten Rubio & Rolán, 2022
- Circulus taiwanensis Rubio & Rolán, 2022
- Circulus tatei (Angas, 1879)
- Circulus templadoi Rubio & Rolán, 2022
- † Circulus tenuiliratus (Cossmann, 1915)
- Circulus tenuiradiatus Rubio & Rolán, 2022
- † Circulus tenuistriatus (Deshayes, 1862)
- Circulus teramachii (Habe, 1958)
- Circulus texanus (Moore, 1965)
- Circulus tongaensis Rubio & Rolán, 2022
- Circulus transculptus (Laseron, 1958)
- Circulus troncosoi Rubio & Rolán, 2022
- Circulus tuberopertus Rubio & Rolán, 2022
- Circulus umbilicordatus Rubio & Rolán, 2022
- † Circulus unicarinus (Laws, 1940)
- Circulus urgorrii Rubio & Rolán, 2022
- Circulus valdesculpturatus Rubio & Rolán, 2022
- Circulus vanuatuensis Rubio & Rolán, 2022
- Circulus venustus (Hedley, 1901)
- Circulus victormonzoi Rubio & Rolán, 2022
- Circulus villacampae Rubio & Rolán, 2022
- Circulus virginiae (Jousseaume, 1872)
- Circulus virginieherosae Rubio & Rolán, 2022
- Circulus xuae L.-W. Lin & Rolán, 2024

The Indo-Pacific Molluscan Database also mentions the following species with names in current use :

- Circulus callusa (Laseron, 1958)
- Circulus pachyston (Verco, 1907)

Species brought into synonymy

- Circulus bailyi Hertlein & A. M. Strong, 1951: synonym of Cyclostremiscus bailyi (Hertlein & A. M. Strong, 1951)
- Circulus biporcata [sic]: synonym of Circulus biporcatus (A. Adams, 1863)
- Circulus carinulatus Locard, 1889: synonym of Circulus striatus (Philippi, 1836)
- Circulus cerrosensis Bartsch, 1907 accepted as Cyclostremiscus cerrosensis (Bartsch, 1907)
- Circulus cingulatus Bartrum, 1919 † accepted as Pterolabrella cingulata (Bartrum, 1919) †
- Circulus costulatus Locard, 1889: synonym of Circulus striatus (Philippi, 1836)
- Circulus cubanus Pilsbry & Aguayo, 1933: synonym of Cyclostremiscus cubanus (Pilsbry & Aguayo, 1933)
- Circulus dalli Bush, 1897: synonym of Cyclostremiscus dalli (Bush, 1897)
- Circulus delectabile (Tate, 1899) accepted as Circulus delectabilis (Tate, 1899) (unaccepted > incorrect grammatical agreement of specific epithet)
- Circulus diomedeae Bartsch, 1911 accepted as Cyclostremiscus diomedeae (Bartsch, 1911)
- Circulus formosissimus Brugnone, 1873: synonym of Skeneoides jeffreysii (Monterosato, 1872)
- Circulus hendersoni (Dall, 1927): synonym of Cyclostremiscus hendersoni (Dall, 1927)
- Circulus jeffreysii Monterosato, 1872: synonym of Skeneoides jeffreysii (Monterosato, 1872)
- Circulus madreensis F. Baker, Hanna & A. M. Strong, 1938 accepted as Cyclostremiscus madreensis (F. Baker, Hanna & A. M. Strong, 1938)
- Circulus margaritiformis (Dall, 1927): synonym of Cirsonella margaritiformis (Dall, 1927)
- Circulus modesta [sic]: synonym of Circulus modestus (Gould, 1859)
- Circulus nicholsoni A. M. Strong & Hertlein, 1939 accepted as Episcynia nicholsoni (A. M. Strong & Hertlein, 1939)
- Circulus perlatus Pelseneer, 1903 accepted as Orbitestella perlata (Pelseneer, 1903) (original combination)
- Circulus philippinensis Rubio & Rolán, 2022: synonym of Circulus pacomartinezi Rubio & Rolán, 2023 (junior homonym, invalid: secondary junior homonym of Circulus philippinensis (Shuto, 1969); C. pacomartinezi is a replacement name)
- Circulus sarsi (Bush, 1897) accepted as Orbitestella sarsi (Bush, 1897)
- Circulus stirophorus M. Smith, 1937: synonym of Cyclostremiscus beauii (P. Fischer, 1857)
- * Circulus taigai Hertlein & A. M. Strong, 1951 accepted as Cyclostremiscus taigai (Hertlein & A. M. Strong, 1951)
- Circulus tornata [sic]: synonym of Circulus tornatus (A. Adams, 1864)
- Circulus tornatus (A. Adams, 1864): synonym of Tuberes tornatus (A. Adams, 1864) (unaccepted > superseded combination)
- Circulus translucens (Dall, 1927): synonym of Xyloskenea translucens (Dall, 1927)
- Circulus tricarinatus (Wood S., 1848): synonym of accepted as Circulus striatus (Philippi, 1836)
