= L. formosa =

L. formosa may refer to:

- Lambertia formosa, a shrub endemic to New South Wales
- Leptoxis formosa, an extinct snail
- Leycesteria formosa, a deciduous shrub
- Libertia formosa, a synonym of Libertia chilensis, an ornamental plant
- Lodderena formosa, a sea snail
- Lorryia formosa, an acariform mite

== See also ==
- Lithodes formosae, a king crab
