= L. nana =

L. nana may refer to:

- Lemuresthes nana, the Madagascar munia, a finch species native to Madagascar
- Lodderena nana, a minute sea snail species
- Lysibia nana, a hyperparasitoid wasp

== See also ==
- Nana (disambiguation)
