= Vitrinella bifilata =

Scientific classification
- Kingdom: Animalia
- Phylum: Mollusca
- Class: Gastropoda
- Subclass: Caenogastropoda
- Order: Littorinimorpha
- Family: Vitrinellidae
- Genus: Vitrinella
- Species: V. bifilata

Binomial name
- Vitrinella bifilata Carpenter, 1857

Species of gastropod

Vitrinella bifilata is a species of gastropod in the family Tornidae. The scientific name of this species was first published in 1857 by Carpenter.

== Distribution ==
This marine species occurs off Panama.
