= Circulus cinguliferus =

Scientific classification
- Kingdom: Animalia
- Phylum: Mollusca
- Class: Gastropoda
- Subclass: Caenogastropoda
- Order: Littorinimorpha
- Family: Vitrinellidae
- Genus: Circulus
- Species: C. cinguliferus

Binomial name
- Circulus cinguliferus (A. Adams, 1850)

Synonyms
- Cyclostrema cinguliferum A. Adams, 1850

Species of gastropod

Circulus cinguliferus is a species of sea snail, a marine gastropod mollusk in the family Vitrinellidae.

== Distribution ==
This marine species occurs in the Indian Ocean off Madagascar.
