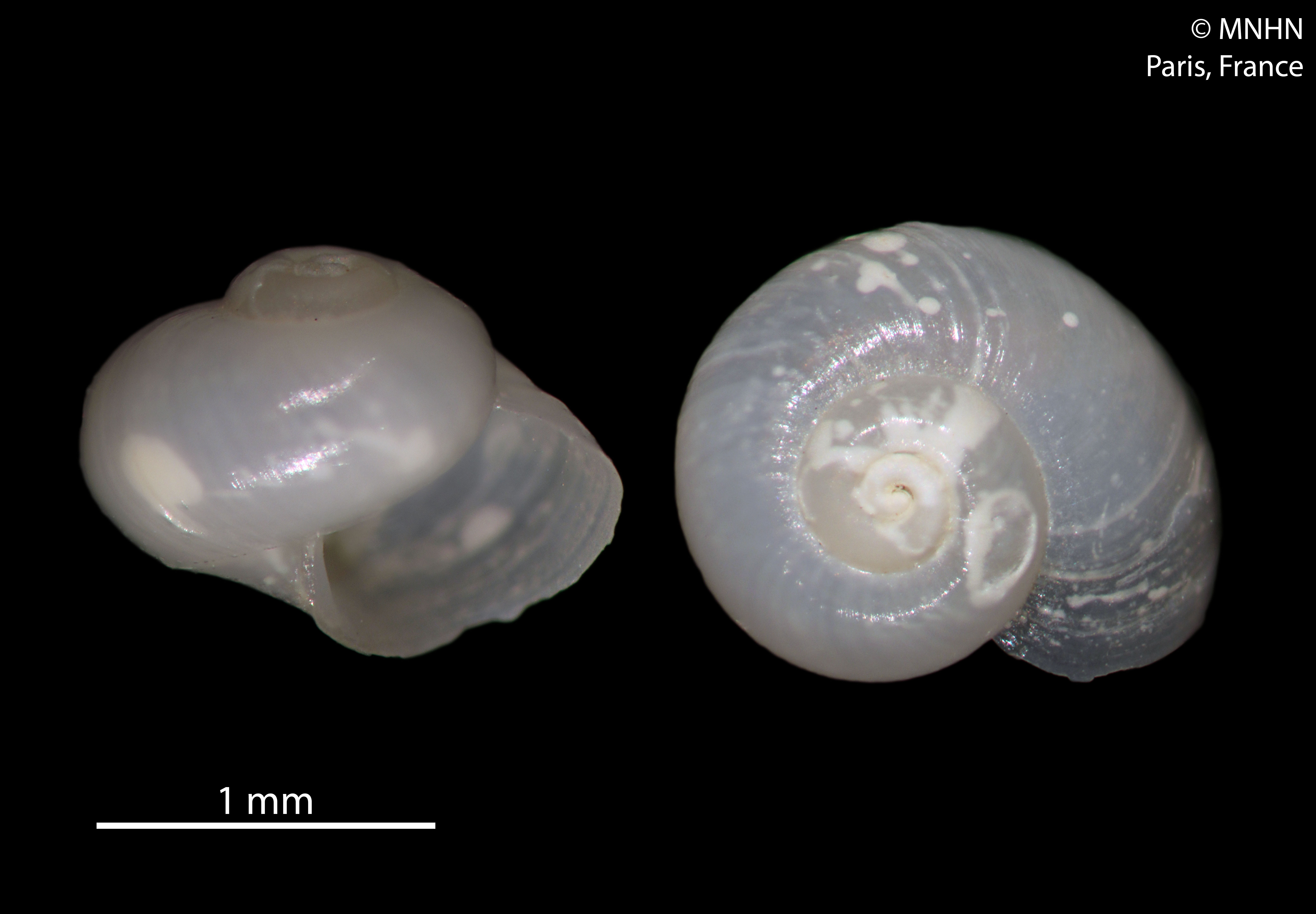
- Xyloskenea consors

Scientific classification
- Kingdom: Animalia
- Phylum: Mollusca
- Class: Gastropoda
- Subclass: Vetigastropoda
- Superfamily: Seguenzioidea
- Family: incertae sedis
- Genus: Xyloskenea; B.A. Marshall, 1988

Type species
- Xyloskenea costulifera Marshall, B.A., 1988

= Xyloskenea =

Genus of gastropods

Xyloskenea is a genus of sea snails, marine gastropod molluscs, unassigned in the superfamily Seguenzioidea.

== Species ==
Species within the genus Xyloskenea include:

- Xyloskenea consors B. A. Marshall, 1988
- Xyloskenea costulifera B. A. Marshall, 1988
- Xyloskenea depressa B. A. Marshall, 1988
- Xyloskenea grahami B.A. Marshall, 1988
- Xyloskenea naticiformis (Jeffreys, 1883)
- Xyloskenea rhyssa (Dall, 1927)
- Xyloskenea translucens (Dall, 1927)

Synonyms

- Xyloskenea xenos Hoffman, Van Heugten & Lavaleye, 2010: synonym of Trenchia xenos (Hoffman, Van Heugten & Lavaleye, 2010)
