= Lodderena minima =

Scientific classification
- Kingdom: Animalia
- Phylum: Mollusca
- Class: Gastropoda
- Subclass: Vetigastropoda
- Order: Trochida
- Genus: Lodderena
- Species: L. minima

Binomial name
- Lodderena minima (Tenison-Woods, 1878)

Synonyms
- Liotia minima Tenison-Woods, 1878; Lodderia minima Tenison-Woods, 1878

Species of gastropod

Lodderena minima, common name the minute liotia, is a species of small sea snail, a marine gastropod mollusk in the family Skeneidae.

== Description ==
The size of this minute shell varies between 0.5 mm and 1.1 mm. The translucent white shell has a planorbiform shape with a flat or slightly raised spire. The shell contains about three whorls with 1½ whorl in the protoconch. The shell is devoid of ornament, except the regular spiral groove. It has, however, a remarkably thickened, smooth varix round the circular aperture, and a granularly margined, wide umbilicus.

== Distribution ==
This marine species is endemic to Australia and occurs off Queensland, southwards to Tasmania and South Australia.
