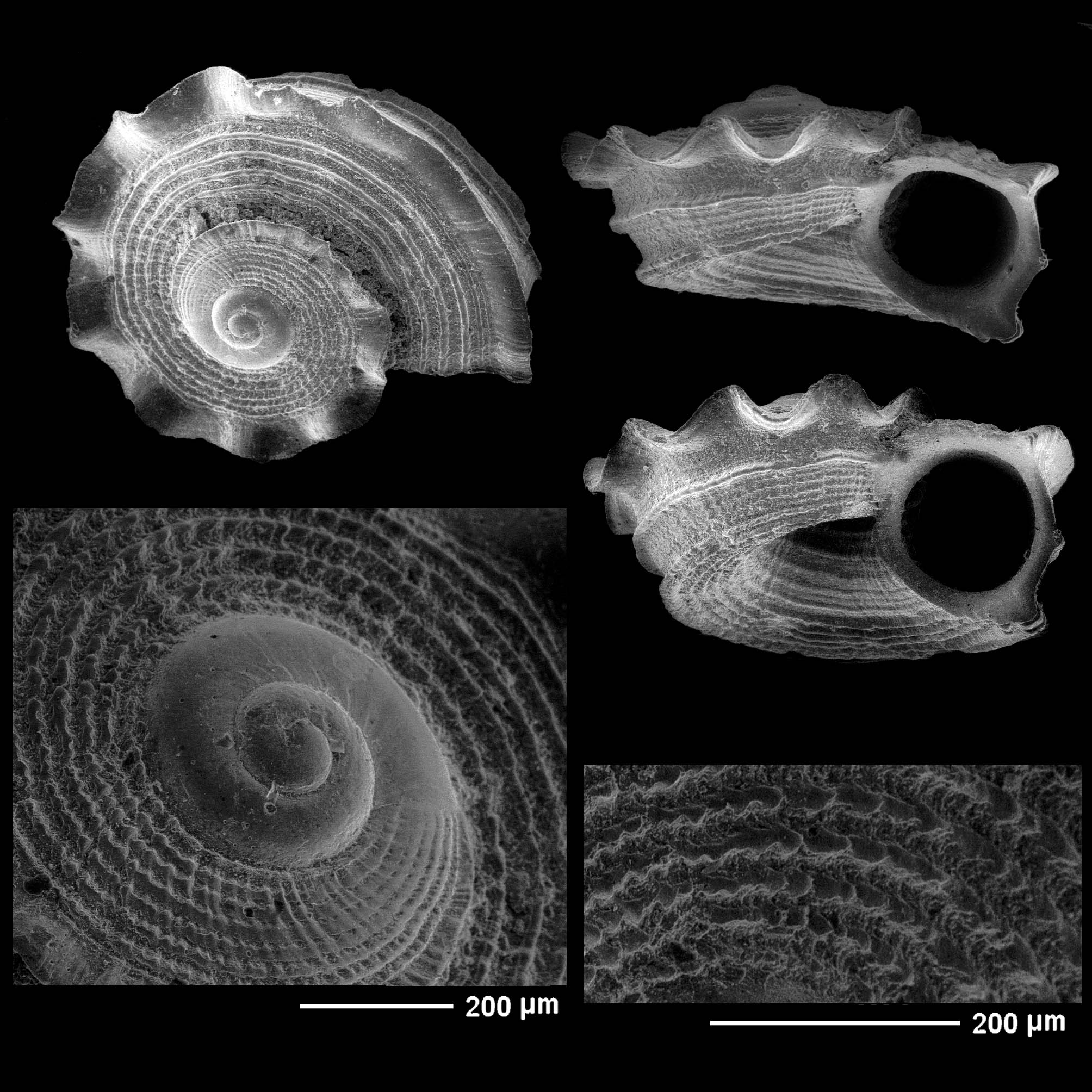
- Shell of Carinatus regius (holotype at MNHN, Paris)

Scientific classification
- Kingdom: Animalia
- Phylum: Mollusca
- Class: Gastropoda
- Subclass: Caenogastropoda
- Order: Littorinimorpha
- Superfamily: Truncatelloidea
- Family: Vitrinellidae
- Genus: Carinatus; Rubio & Rolán, 2020

Type species
- Carinatus regius Rubio & Rolán, 2020

= Carinatus =

Genus of gastropods

Collatus is a genus of very small and minute sea snails with an operculum, marine gastropod mollusks in the family Vitrinellidae.

== Species ==
- Carinatus bicarinatus Rubio & Rolán, 2020
- Carinatus fijiensis Rubio & Rolán, 2020
- Carinatus gracilis Rubio & Rolán, 2020
- Carinatus ministriatus Rubio & Rolán, 2020
- Carinatus obesus Rubio & Rolán, 2020
- Carinatus regius Rubio & Rolán, 2020
- Carinatus simplex Rubio & Rolán, 2020
- Carinatus variabilis Rubio & Rolán, 2020
