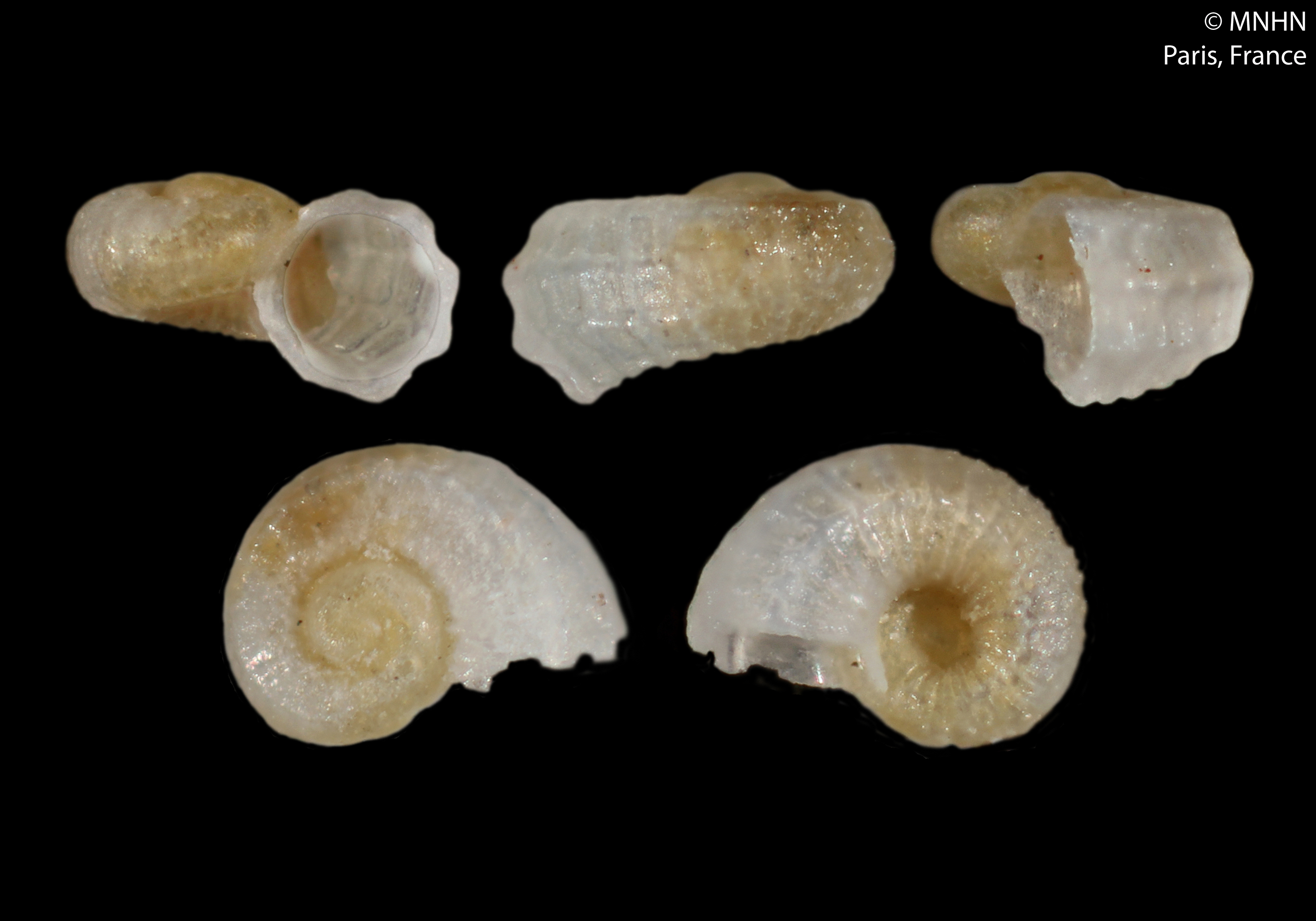
- Skeneoides exilissima

Scientific classification
- Kingdom: Animalia
- Phylum: Mollusca
- Class: Gastropoda
- Subclass: Vetigastropoda
- Order: Trochida
- Superfamily: Trochoidea
- Family: Skeneidae
- Genus: Skeneoides; Warén, 1992

Type species
- Delphinula exilissima Philippi, 1844

= Skeneoides =

Genus of gastropods

Skeneoides is a genus of sea snails, marine gastropod mollusks in the family Skeneidae.

== Species ==
Species within the genus Skeneoides include:

- † Skeneoides crassistriata Lozouet, 1999
- Skeneoides exilissima (Philippi, 1844)
- Skeneoides formosissima (Brugnone, 1873)
- † Skeneoides tenuistriata Lozouet, 1999

Species brought into synonymy

- Skeneoides digeronimoi (La Perna, 1998): synonym of Dasyskenea digeronimoi (La Perna, 1998) (original combination)
- Skeneoides jeffreysii (Monterosato, 1872): synonym of Skeneoides formosissima (Brugnone, 1873)
