= Lodderena bunnelli =

Scientific classification
- Kingdom: Animalia
- Phylum: Mollusca
- Class: Gastropoda
- Subclass: Vetigastropoda
- Order: Trochida
- Genus: Lodderena
- Species: L. bunnelli

Binomial name
- Lodderena bunnelli Redfern & Rolan, 2005

Species of gastropod

Lodderena bunnelli is a species of small sea snail, a marine gastropod mollusk in the family Skeneidae.

== Description ==
The size of the shell attains 0.64 mm.

== Distribution ==
This species occurs in the Atlantic Ocean off the Bahamas at a depth of 6 m.
