= Trenchia agulhasae argentinae =

Scientific classification
- Domain: Eukaryota
- Kingdom: Animalia
- Phylum: Mollusca
- Class: Gastropoda
- Subclass: Vetigastropoda
- Family: incertae sedis
- Genus: Trenchia
- Species: T. agulhasae
- Subspecies: T. a. argentinae

Trinomial name
- Trenchia agulhasae argentinae (Clarke, 1961)

Synonyms
- Choristes agulhasae argentinae Clarke, 1961 (original combination)

Species of gastropod

Trenchia agulhasae argentinae is a subspecies of sea snail, a marine gastropod mollusk, unassigned in the superfamily Seguenzioidea.

== Description ==
The shell grows to a height of 3.5 mm.

== Distribution ==
This subspecies occurs in the Atlantic Ocean in the abyssal zone off Argentina.
