= Lodderena tanae =

Scientific classification
- Kingdom: Animalia
- Phylum: Mollusca
- Class: Gastropoda
- Subclass: Vetigastropoda
- Order: Trochida
- Genus: Lodderena
- Species: L. tanae

Binomial name
- Lodderena tanae Moolenbeek, 1996

Species of gastropod

Lodderena tanae is a species of sea snail, a marine gastropod mollusk in the family Skeneidae.

== Distribution ==
This species occurs in the Arabian Sea off Oman.
