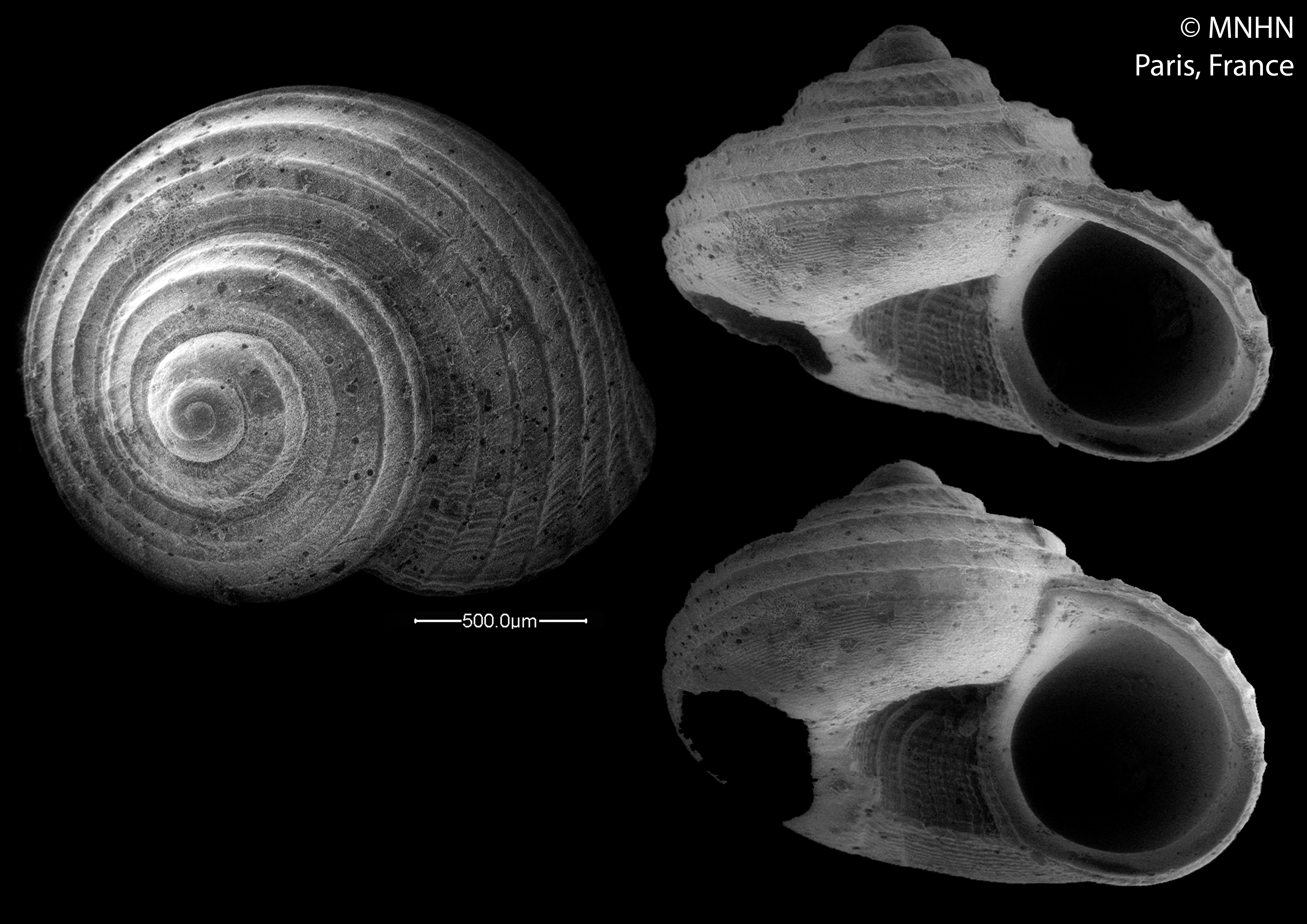
- Shell of Collatus parvus (holotype at MNHN, Paris)

Scientific classification
- Kingdom: Animalia
- Phylum: Mollusca
- Class: Gastropoda
- Subclass: Caenogastropoda
- Order: Littorinimorpha
- Superfamily: Truncatelloidea
- Family: Vitrinellidae
- Genus: Collatus; Rubio & Rolán, 2019

= Collatus =

Genus of gastropods

Collatus is a genus of very small sea snails, marine gastropod mollusks in the family Vitrinellidae. These snails possess an operculum.

== Species ==
- Collatus conversus Rubio & Rolán, 2018
- Collatus labri Rubio & Rolán, 2018
- Collatus papuensis Rubio & Rolán, 2018
- Collatus parvus Rubio & Rolán, 2018
- Collatus regularis Rubio & Rolán, 2018
- Collatus surrectus Rubio & Rolán, 2018
