= Lodderena pachynepion =

Scientific classification
- Kingdom: Animalia
- Phylum: Mollusca
- Class: Gastropoda
- Subclass: Vetigastropoda
- Order: Trochida
- Genus: Lodderena
- Species: L. pachynepion

Binomial name
- Lodderena pachynepion (Pilsbry & Olsson, 1945)

Species of gastropod

Lodderena pachynepion is a species of sea snail, a marine gastropod mollusk in the family Skeneidae.
