= Lodderena omanensis =

Scientific classification
- Kingdom: Animalia
- Phylum: Mollusca
- Class: Gastropoda
- Subclass: Vetigastropoda
- Order: Trochida
- Genus: Lodderena
- Species: L. omanensis

Binomial name
- Lodderena omanensis Moolenbeek, 1996

Species of gastropod

Lodderena omanensis is a species of small sea snail, a marine gastropod mollusk in the family Skeneidae.

== Distribution ==
This marine species occurs in the Gulf of Oman.
