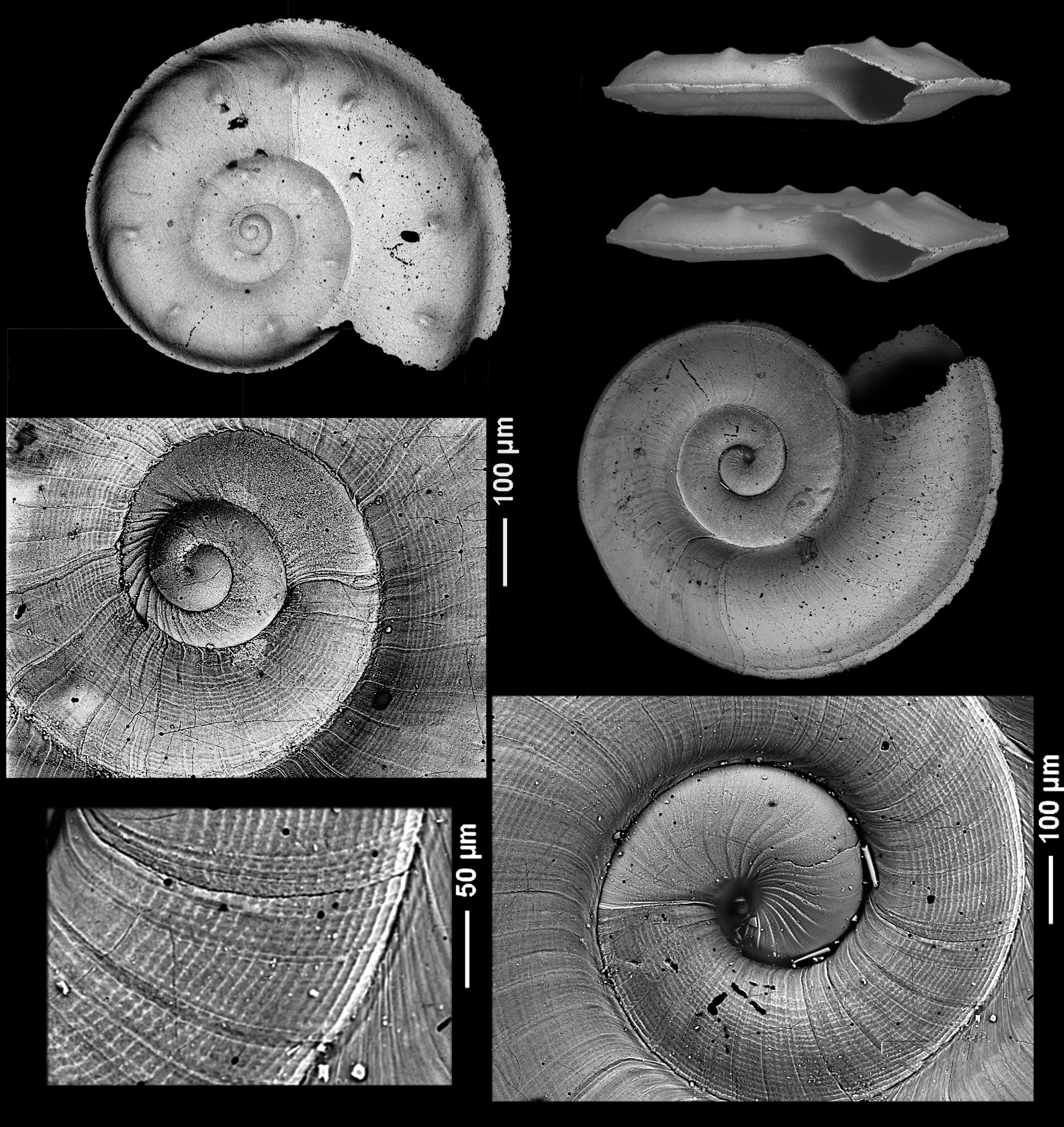
- Shell of Monodosus planus (holotype at MNHN, Paris)

Scientific classification
- Kingdom: Animalia
- Phylum: Mollusca
- Class: Gastropoda
- Subclass: Caenogastropoda
- Order: Littorinimorpha
- Superfamily: Truncatelloidea
- Family: Vitrinellidae
- Genus: Monodosus; Rubio & Rolán, 2016

Type species
- Monodosus planus Rubio & Rolán, 2016

= Monodosus =

Genus of gastropods

Monodosus is a genus of very small and minute sea snails with an operculum, marine gastropod mollusks in the family Vitrinellidae.

== Species ==
- Monodosus brevispiralis Rubio & Rolán, 2016
- Monodosus externus Rubio & Rolán, 2016
- Monodosus multinodosus Rubio & Rolán, 2016
- Monodosus paucistriatus Rubio & Rolán, 2016
- Monodosus planus Rubio & Rolán, 2016
- Monodosus prolatus Rubio & Rolán, 2016
- Monodosus proximus Rubio & Rolán, 2016
- Monodosus simulans Rubio & Rolán, 2016
