= Trenchia agulhasae =

Scientific classification
- Kingdom: Animalia
- Phylum: Mollusca
- Class: Gastropoda
- Subclass: Vetigastropoda
- Superfamily: Seguenzioidea
- Family: incertae sedis
- Genus: Trenchia
- Species: T. agulhasae

Binomial name
- Trenchia agulhasae (A. H. Clarke, 1961)

Synonyms
- Choristella agulhasae (A. H. Clarke, 1961) (superseded combination); Choristes agulhasae A. H. Clarke, 1961 (original combination)

Species of gastropod

Trenchia agulhasae is a species of small, deep water sea snail, a marine gastropod mollusk in the family unassigned Seguenzioidea.

Subspecies
Trenchia agulhasae argentinae (Clarke, 1961)

== Distribution ==
This species was found in the Agulhas Basin.
