= Lodderena janetmayae =

Scientific classification
- Kingdom: Animalia
- Phylum: Mollusca
- Class: Gastropoda
- Subclass: Vetigastropoda
- Order: Trochida
- Genus: Lodderena
- Species: L. janetmayae

Binomial name
- Lodderena janetmayae Rubio, Rolan & Redfern, 1998

Species of gastropod

Lodderena janetmayae is a species of sea snail, a marine gastropod mollusk in the family Skeneidae.

== Description ==
The average length of the shell is 1 mm.

== Distribution ==
This species occurs in the Atlantic Ocean off the Bahamas at a depth of 14 m.
