= Xyloskenea naticiformis =

Scientific classification
- Kingdom: Animalia
- Phylum: Mollusca
- Class: Gastropoda
- Subclass: Vetigastropoda
- Family: incertae sedis
- Genus: Xyloskenea
- Species: X. naticiformis

Binomial name
- Xyloskenea naticiformis (Jeffreys, 1883)

Synonyms
- Adeorbis umbilicatus Locard, 1898; Cithna excavata Sykes, 1925; Cithna naticiformis Jeffreys, 1883 (original combination)

Species of gastropod

Xyloskenea naticiformis is a species of sea snail, a marine gastropod mollusc.

== Description ==
The shell grows to a height of 2.5 mm.

== Distribution ==
This species occurs at bathyal depths in the Northern Atlantic Ocean, in the Bay of Biscay and off Portugal.
