= Xyloskenea depressa =

Scientific classification
- Kingdom: Animalia
- Phylum: Mollusca
- Class: Gastropoda
- Subclass: Vetigastropoda
- Family: incertae sedis
- Genus: Xyloskenea
- Species: X. depressa

Binomial name
- Xyloskenea depressa B. A. Marshall, 1988

Species of gastropod

Xyloskenea depressa is a species of sea snail, a marine gastropod mollusk, unassigned in the superfamily Seguenzioidea, the turban snails.

== Distribution ==
This marine species occurs off New Zealand.
