= Trenchia anselmoi =

Scientific classification
- Kingdom: Animalia
- Phylum: Mollusca
- Class: Gastropoda
- Subclass: Vetigastropoda
- Superfamily: Seguenzioidea
- Family: incertae sedis
- Genus: Trenchia
- Species: T. anselmoi

Binomial name
- Trenchia anselmoi Rubio & Rolán, 2013

Species of gastropod

Trenchia anselmoi is a species of sea snail, a marine gastropod mollusk, unassigned in the superfamily Seguenzioidea.
