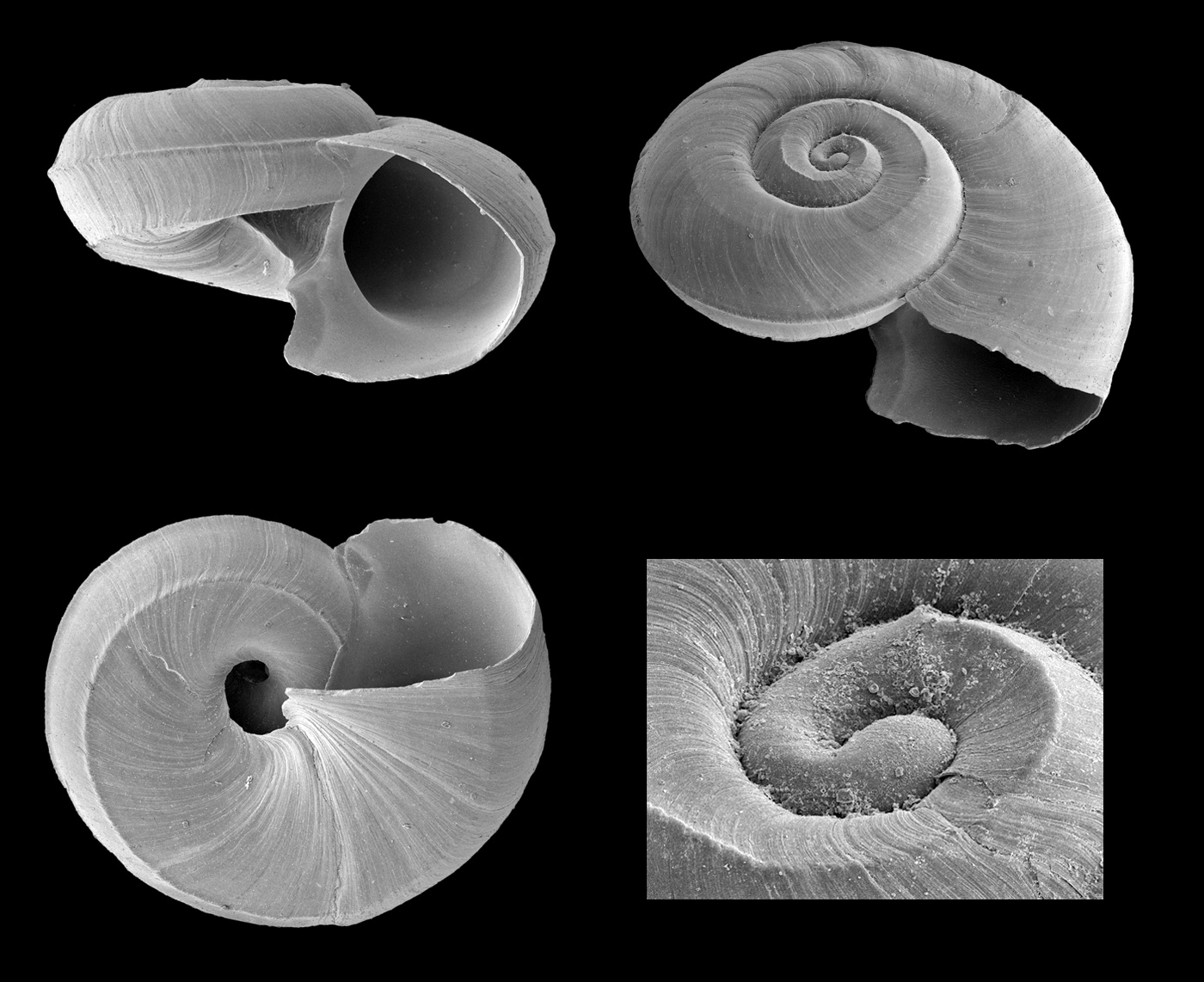
- Shell of Trenchia teriuga (holotype at MNHN, Paris)

Scientific classification
- Kingdom: Animalia
- Phylum: Mollusca
- Class: Gastropoda
- Subclass: Vetigastropoda
- Superfamily: Seguenzioidea
- Family: incertae sedis
- Genus: Trenchia; Knudsen, 1964

Type species
- Trenchia wolffi Knudsen J., 1964

= Trenchia =

Genus of gastropods

Trenchia is a genus of sea snails, marine gastropod mollusks, unassigned in the superfamily Seguenzioidea.

== Notes ==
Additional information regarding this genus:

- It was previously placed in the subfamily Skeneidae of the Turbinidae as a placeholder, since many other taxa in Skeneidae were of uncertain phylogenetic position.

== Species ==
Species within the genus Trenchia include:

- Trenchia agulhasae (Clarke, 1961)
- Trenchia anselmoi Rubio & Rolán, 2013
- Trenchia biangulata Rubio & Rolán, 2013
- Trenchia teriuga Hoffman, Gofas & Freiwald, 2020
- Trenchia wolffi Knudsen, 1964
- Trenchia xenos (Hoffman, Van Heugten & Lavaleye, 2010)

Species brought into synonymy

- Trenchia argentinae (Clarke, 1961): synonym of Trenchia agulhasae argentinae (Clarke, 1961)
