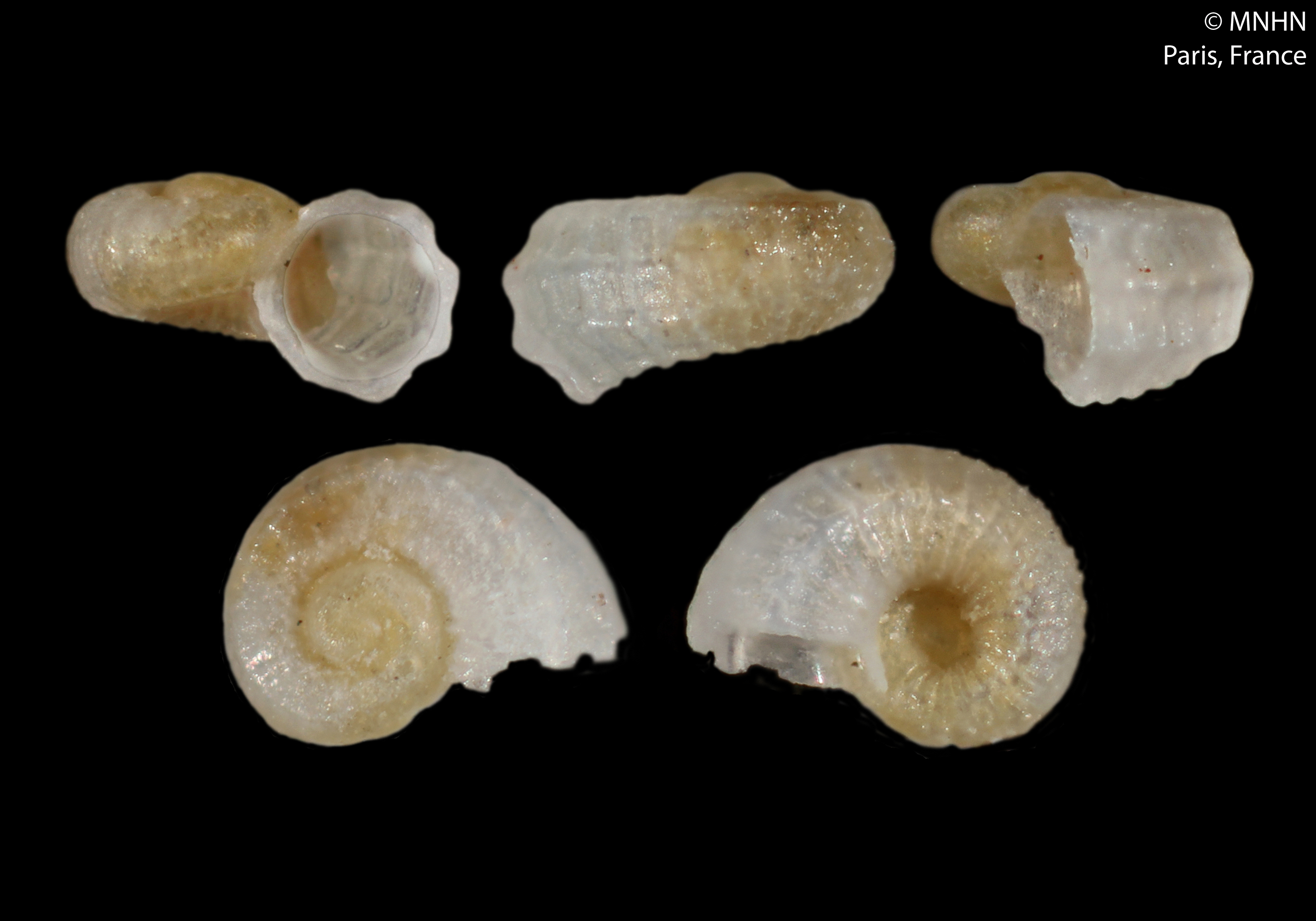
- Shell of Skeneoides exilissima (syntype at MNHN, Paris)

Scientific classification
- Kingdom: Animalia
- Phylum: Mollusca
- Class: Gastropoda
- Subclass: Vetigastropoda
- Order: Trochida
- Family: Skeneidae
- Genus: Skeneoides
- Species: S. exilissima

Binomial name
- Skeneoides exilissima (Philippi, 1844)

Synonyms
- Cyclostrema dautzenbergianum Ancey, 1898; Cyclostrema subalveolatum Fekih & Gougerot, 1974; Delphinula exilissima Philippi, 1844 (original combination); Skenea exilissima (Philippi 1844)

= Skeneoides exilissima =

Species of gastropod

Skeneoides exilissima is a species of minute sea snail, a marine gastropod mollusk in the family Skeneidae.

== Description ==
The size of the shell reaches up to 1 mm.

== Distribution ==
This species occurs in the western Mediterranean Sea off Algeria and Tunisia.
