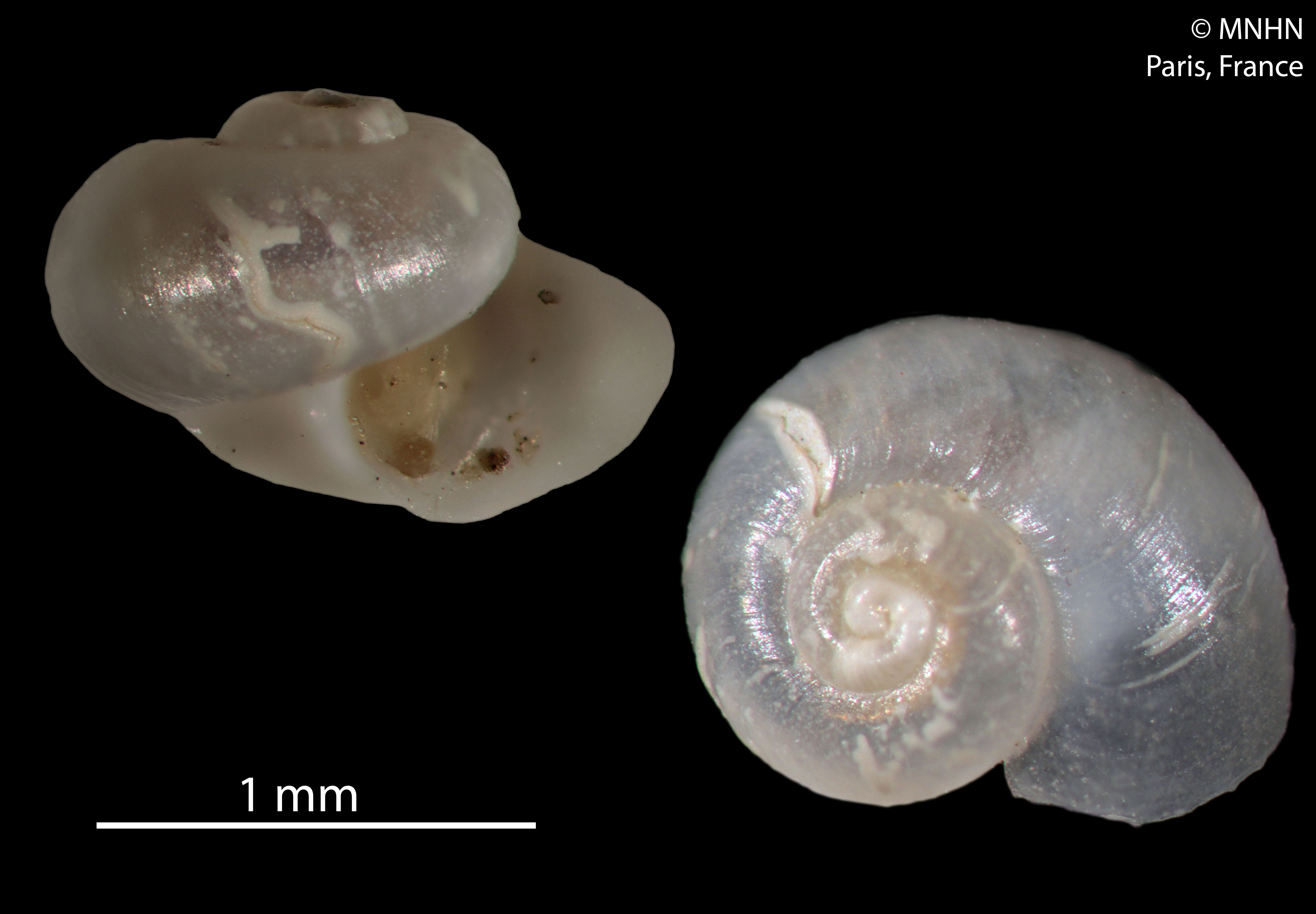
- Shell of Xyloskenea grahami (paratype at MNHN, Paris)

Scientific classification
- Kingdom: Animalia
- Phylum: Mollusca
- Class: Gastropoda
- Subclass: Vetigastropoda
- Superfamily: Seguenzioidea
- Family: incertae sedis
- Genus: Xyloskenea
- Species: X. grahami

Binomial name
- Xyloskenea grahami B. A. Marshall, 1988

= Xyloskenea grahami =

Species of gastropod

Xyloskenea grahami is a species of sea snail, a marine gastropod mollusk, unassigned in the superfamily Seguenzioidea.

== Description ==
The height of the shell attains 2 mm. The shell is translucent to opaque white.

== Distribution ==
This marine species occurs off New South Wales, Australia. They live on waterlogged wood, known from 439-714 m.
