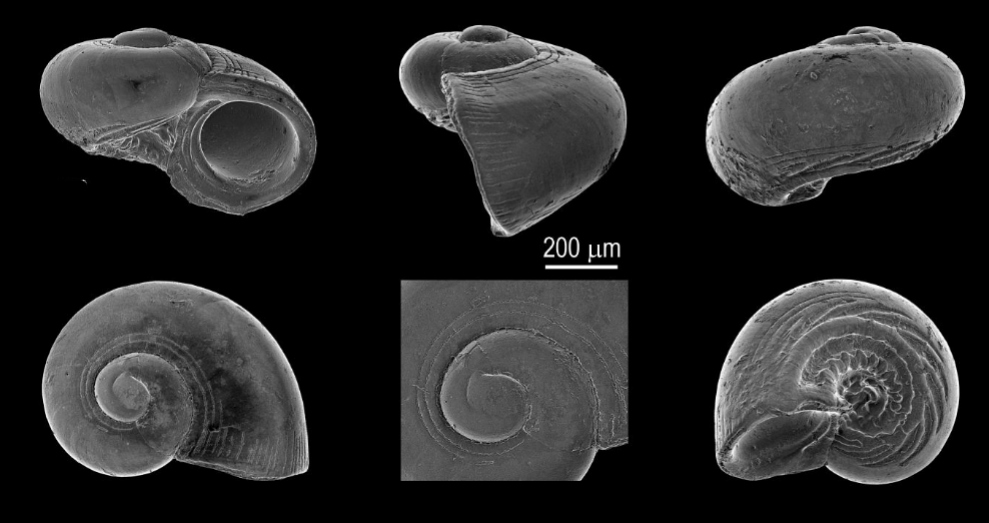
- Shell of Lodderena arifca (holotype at the Smithsonian Institution)

Scientific classification
- Kingdom: Animalia
- Phylum: Mollusca
- Class: Gastropoda
- Subclass: Vetigastropoda
- Order: Trochida
- Superfamily: Trochoidea
- Genus: Lodderena; Iredale, 1924

Type species
- Liotia minima Tenison-Woods, J.E., 1878

Species
- See text

= Lodderena =

Lodderena Temporal range: Miocene to Recent

Genus of gastropods

Lodderena is a genus of minute sea snails or micromolluscs, marine gastropod molluscs, formerly in the family Skeneidae. Following a morphological reevaluation, it was excluded from Skeneidae and treated as incertae sedis within the superfamily Trochoidea.

== Species ==
Species within the genus Lodderena include:

- Lodderena arifca (Bartsch, 1915)
- Lodderena bunnelli Redfern & Rolán, 2005
- Lodderena emeryi (Ladd, 1966)
- Lodderena formosa Powell, 1930
- Lodderena janetmayae Rubio, F., E.M. Rolán & C. Redfern, 1998
- Lodderena minima (Tenison-Woods, J.E., 1878)
- Lodderena nana Powell, 1930
  - Subspecies Lodderena nana pooki Fleming, 1948
- Lodderena omanensis Moolenbeek, 1996
- Lodderena ornata (Olsson & McGinty, 1958)
- Lodderena pachynepion (Pilsbry & Olsson, 1945)
- Lodderena pulchella (Olsson & McGinty, 1958)
- Lodderena tanae Moolenbeek, 1996
- Lodderena vladimiri Chernyshev, Rolán & Rubio, 2016

Species brought into synonymy

- Lodderena catenoides (Monterosato, 1877): synonym of Skenea catenoides (Monterosato, 1877)
