= Trenchia wolffi =

Scientific classification
- Kingdom: Animalia
- Phylum: Mollusca
- Class: Gastropoda
- Subclass: Vetigastropoda
- Family: incertae sedis
- Genus: Trenchia
- Species: T. wolffi

Binomial name
- Trenchia wolffi Knudsen, 1964

Species of gastropod

Trenchia wolffi is a species of sea snail, a marine gastropod mollusk, unassigned in the superfamily Seguenzioidea, the turban snails.

== Distribution ==
This marine species occurs off New Zealand.
