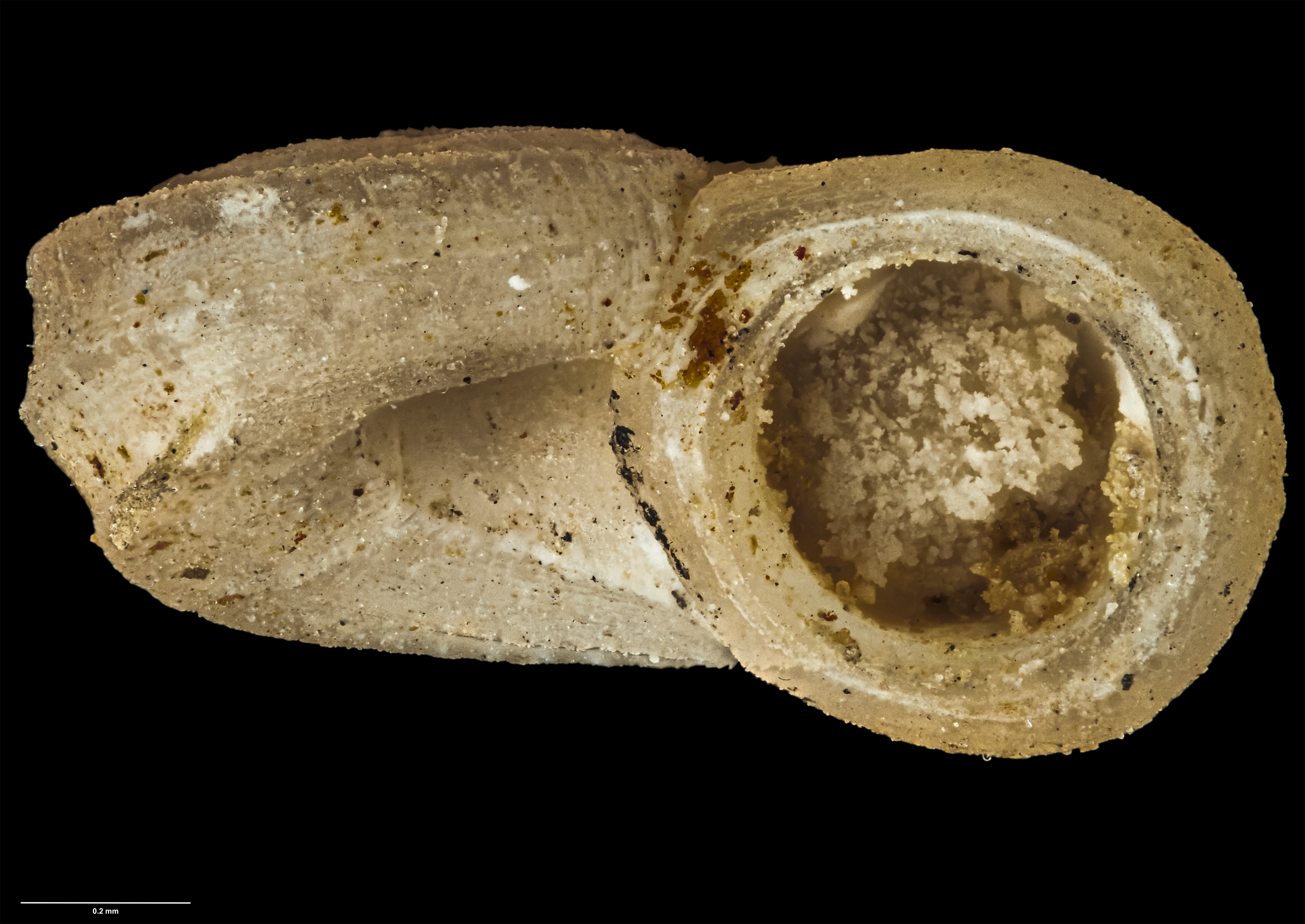
- Lodderena formosa

Scientific classification
- Kingdom: Animalia
- Phylum: Mollusca
- Class: Gastropoda
- Subclass: Vetigastropoda
- Order: Trochida
- Genus: Lodderena
- Species: L. formosa

Binomial name
- Lodderena formosa Powell, 1930

Synonyms
- Lodderia formosa Powell, 1930

= Lodderena formosa =

Species of gastropod

Lodderena formosa is a minute sea snail or micromollusc, a marine gastropod mollusc in the family Skeneidae.

== Description ==
The shell is small and nearly flat, with approximately 2 3/4 whorls. It features three prominent spiral keels that are visible from the front. The uppermost keel defines the almost flat upper surface, while the lowest one marks the base, with a third keel midway between them at the periphery. Additionally, there are fine, close spiral lirae numbering about twenty on the upper surface, along with two intermediate spiral ribs of varying strength both above and below. These ribs are more pronounced near the sutures and the edge of the umbilicus. The suture is deeply channeled, with vertical sides comprising about one-quarter of the shell's major diameter at the base, which measures approximately 1.4 mm. The minimum diameter is 1 mm, and the shell reaches a height of about 0.75 mm. The aperture exhibits considerable variation in its structure. Internally, the peristome forms a smooth, continuous inner ring. In terms of color, the shell appears dull-white, characteristic of specimens that are no longer living.

== Distribution ==
This marine species, first described by A.W.B. Powell in 1930, is endemic to New Zealand. It is a minute sea snail or micromollusc, a marine gastropod mollusc in the family Skeneidae.
