= Skeneoides formosissima =

Scientific classification
- Kingdom: Animalia
- Phylum: Mollusca
- Class: Gastropoda
- Subclass: Vetigastropoda
- Order: Trochida
- Family: Skeneidae
- Genus: Skeneoides
- Species: S. formosissima

Binomial name
- Skeneoides formosissima (Brugnone, 1873)

Synonyms
- Circulus formosissimus Brugnone, G., 1873; Circulus jeffreysii Monterosato 1872; Skeneoides jeffreysii (Monterosato, 1872)

Species of gastropod

Skeneoides formosissima is a species of small sea snail, a marine gastropod mollusk in the family Skeneidae.

Circulus jeffreysii Monterosato 1872 is the original description by Monterosato, but it is a nomen nudum, although used as valid by Anders Warén, 1992 as a valid taxon.

== Description ==
The size of the shell attains 1 mm.

== Distribution ==
This species occurs in the Mediterranean Sea off Sicily and Croatia.
