= Lodderena emeryi =

Scientific classification
- Kingdom: Animalia
- Phylum: Mollusca
- Class: Gastropoda
- Subclass: Vetigastropoda
- Order: Trochida
- Genus: Lodderena
- Species: L. emeryi

Binomial name
- Lodderena emeryi (Ladd, 1966)

Species of gastropod

Lodderena emeryi is a species of sea snail, a marine gastropod mollusk in the family Skeneidae.

== Distribution ==
This species occurs in the Pacific Ocean off Hawaii.
