= Lodderena nana =

Scientific classification
- Kingdom: Animalia
- Phylum: Mollusca
- Class: Gastropoda
- Subclass: Vetigastropoda
- Order: Trochida
- Genus: Lodderena
- Species: L. nana

Binomial name
- Lodderena nana Powell, 1930

Species of gastropod

Lodderena nana is a species of small sea snail or micromollusc, a marine gastropod mollusc in the family Skeneidae.

== Description ==
The height of the shell attains 0.46 mm, its diameter is 0.72 mm.

== Subspecies ==
- Lodderena nana nana Powell, 1930
- Lodderena nana pooki Fleming, 1948

== Distribution ==
This marine species is endemic to New Zealand.
