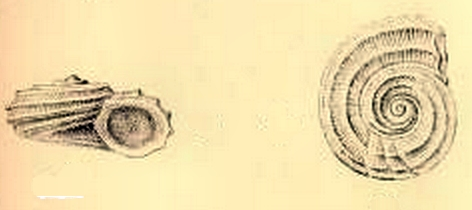
- Original drawing of a shell of Lodderia novemcarinata

Scientific classification
- Kingdom: Animalia
- Phylum: Mollusca
- Class: Gastropoda
- Subclass: Caenogastropoda
- Order: Littorinimorpha
- Superfamily: Truncatelloidea
- Family: Vitrinellidae
- Genus: Circulus
- Species: C. novemcarinatus

Binomial name
- Circulus novemcarinatus (Melvill, 1906)

Synonyms
- Circulus novemcarinatus (Melvill, 1906); Cyclostrema novemcarinatum Melvill, 1906 (original description)

= Circulus novemcarinatus =

Species of gastropod

Circulus novemcarinatus is a minute, sea snail or micromollusc, a marine gastropod mollusc in the family Skeneidae.

== Description ==
The height of the shell attains 1.25 mm, its diameter 3.5 mm. The small white shell has a depressed suborbicular shape. It is deeply umbilicate. It contains 5 whorls, including two minute ones in the apex. It shows nine acute, spiral keels on the body whorl (of which the sutural and the inner umbilical keels are but weakly developed). The shell is minutely radiately, very closely striate, giving it a shagreened and silky appearance The growth lines in the interstices are apparent. The aperture is circular and white on the inside. The peristome is continuous.

== Distribution ==
This species occurs in the Arabian Sea off Muscat, Oman, in the northwest Indian Ocean and in the Red Sea.
