= Xyloskenea rhyssa =

Scientific classification
- Domain: Eukaryota
- Kingdom: Animalia
- Phylum: Mollusca
- Class: Gastropoda
- Subclass: Vetigastropoda
- Family: incertae sedis
- Genus: Xyloskenea
- Species: X. rhyssa

Binomial name
- Xyloskenea rhyssa (Dall, 1927)

Synonyms
- Vitrinella rhyssa Dall, 1927

Species of gastropod

Xyloskenea rhyssa is a species of sea snail, a marine gastropod mollusk, unassigned in the superfamily Seguenzioidea.
