= Lodderena pulchella =

Scientific classification
- Kingdom: Animalia
- Phylum: Mollusca
- Class: Gastropoda
- Subclass: Vetigastropoda
- Order: Trochida
- Genus: Lodderena
- Species: L. pulchella

Binomial name
- Lodderena pulchella (Olsson & McGinty, 1958)

Synonyms
- Cyclostremiscus pulchellus Olsson & McGinty, 1958; Cyclostremiscus schrammi auct. non Fischer, 1857; Pachystremiscus pulchella Olsson & McGinty, 1958

Species of gastropod

Lodderena pulchella is a species of small sea snail, a marine gastropod mollusk in the family Skeneidae.

== Description ==
The size of the shell attains 0.85 mm.

== Distribution ==
This species occurs in the Gulf of Mexico, the Caribbean Sea and in the Atlantic Ocean off Brazil at depths up to 100 m.
