= Xyloskenea translucens =

Scientific classification
- Kingdom: Animalia
- Phylum: Mollusca
- Class: Gastropoda
- Subclass: Vetigastropoda
- Family: incertae sedis
- Genus: Xyloskenea
- Species: X. translucens

Binomial name
- Xyloskenea translucens (Dall, 1927)

Synonyms
- Circulus translucens (Dall, 1927); Lydiphnis translucens Dall, 1927

Species of gastropod

Xyloskenea translucens is a species of sea snail, a marine gastropod mollusk in the family Turbinidae, the turban snails.
