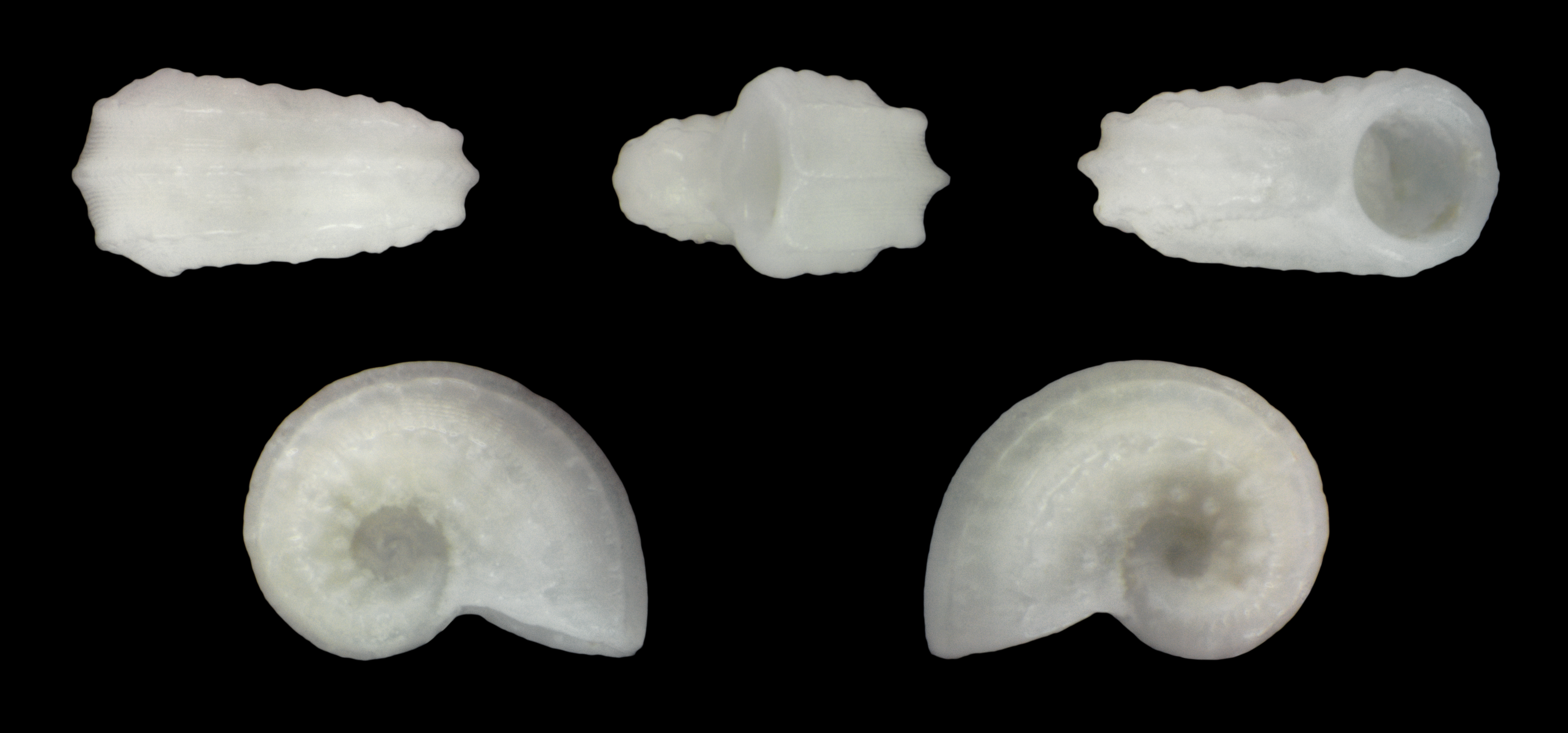

Scientific classification
- Kingdom: Animalia
- Phylum: Mollusca
- Class: Gastropoda
- Subclass: Vetigastropoda
- Order: Trochida
- Genus: Lodderena
- Species: L. ornata

Binomial name
- Lodderena ornata (Olsson & McGinty, 1958)

Synonyms
- Cyclostremiscus emeryi auct. non Ladd, 1966; Cyclostremiscus ornatus Olsson & McGinty, 1958; Cyclostremiscus solitarius Hertlein & Allison, 1968; Pachystremiscus ornata Olsson & McGinty, 1958

= Lodderena ornata =

Species of gastropod

Lodderena ornata is a species of small sea snail, a marine gastropod mollusk in the family Skeneidae.

== Description ==
The size of the shell is 0.8 mm.

== Distribution ==
This marine species occurs in the Atlantic Ocean off the Cape Verde Islands, the Gulf of Guinea, off Brazil; in the Gulf of Mexico and the Caribbean Sea. It has also been reported in the Indian Ocean.
