= Trenchia xenos =

Scientific classification
- Kingdom: Animalia
- Phylum: Mollusca
- Class: Gastropoda
- Subclass: Vetigastropoda
- Family: incertae sedis
- Genus: Trenchia
- Species: T. xenos

Binomial name
- Trenchia xenos Hoffman, Van Heugten & Lavaleye, 2010

Species of gastropod

Trenchia xenos is a species of sea snail, a marine gastropod mollusc, unassigned in the superfamily Seguenzioidea.

== Distribution ==
This species occurs in the northeastern Atlantic Ocean.
