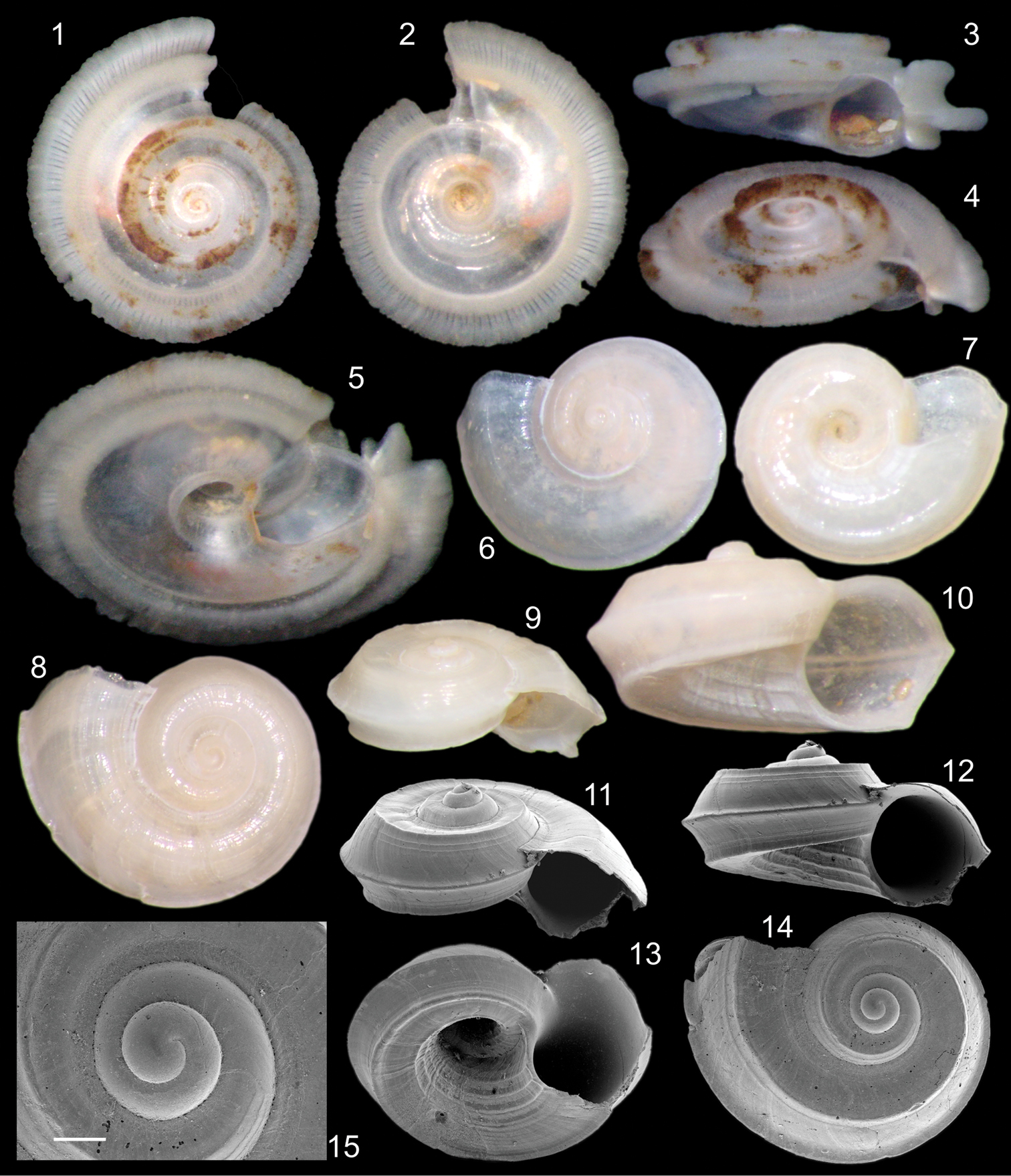

Scientific classification
- Kingdom: Animalia
- Phylum: Mollusca
- Class: Gastropoda
- Subclass: Caenogastropoda
- Order: Littorinimorpha
- Superfamily: Truncatelloidea
- Family: Vitrinellidae; Bush, 1897

Genera
- See text

Synonyms
- Circulidae Fretter & Graham, 1962; Vitrinellinae Bush, 1897

= Vitrinellidae =

Family of gastropods

Vitrinellidae is a family of very small and minute sea snails with an operculum, marine gastropod mollusks in the superfamily Truncatelloidea.

== Genera ==
- Carinatus Rubio & Rolán, 2020
- Circulus Jeffreys, 1865
- Collatus Rubio & Rolán, 2019
- Monodosus Rubio & Rolán, 2016
- Pseudoliotia Tate, 1898
- † Rotellorbis Cossmann, 1888
- Vitrinella C. B. Adams, 1850

Genera brought into synonymy

- Discreliotia Laseron, 1958: synonym of Pseudoliotia Tate, 1898
- Liochrysta Laseron, 1958: synonym of Pseudoliotia Tate, 1898
- Morchinella [sic]: synonym of Moerchinella Thiele, 1931: synonym of Moerchia A. Adams, 1860 (misspelling)
- Soyorota Habe, 1961: synonym of Circulus Jeffreys, 1865
- Subfamily Vitrinellinae Bush, 1897: synonym of Vitrinellidae Bush, 1897
