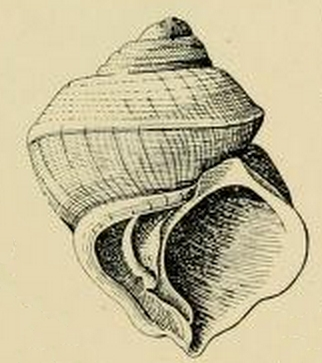
- Drawing of a shell of Crossea biconica

Scientific classification
- Kingdom: Animalia
- Phylum: Mollusca
- Class: Gastropoda
- Subclass: Vetigastropoda
- Order: Trochida
- Superfamily: Trochoidea
- Family: Conradiidae
- Genus: Crossea; A. Adams, 1865

Type species
- Crossea miranda A. Adams, 1865

Synonyms
- Crosseia P. Fischer, 1885 (Invalid: unjustified emendation of Crossea); Crosseola Iredale, 1924

= Crossea =

Genus of gastropods

Crossea is a genus of very small sea snails or micromolluscs, marine gastropod molluscs in the family Conradiidae.

== Distribution ==
Species in this marine genus occur off the Gulf of Oman, Japan, New Zealand, South Africa; off Australia (New South Wales, Northern Territory, Queensland, South Australia, Tasmania, Victoria).

== Species ==
Species within the genus Crossea include:

- Crossea alliciens Melvill, 1910
- Crossea biconica Hedley, 1902
- Crossea cordata Rubio & Rolán, 2019
- Crossea eryma Melvill, 1906
- Crossea exornata Rubio & Rolán, 2019
- Crossea extrema Rubio & Rolán, 2019
- Crossea gatliffi Hedley, 1902
- Crossea gemmata Hedley, 1912
- Crossea miranda A. Adams, 1865
- Crossea nicober Rubio & Rolán, 2019
- Crossea regularis Rubio & Rolán, 2019
- Crossea sepcris Rubio & Rolán, 2019
- Crossea spiralis Rubio & Rolán, 2019
- Crossea striata Watson, 1883
- Crossea ulevidens Rubio & Rolán, 2019
- Crossea ultidepre Rubio & Rolán, 2019
- Crossea vanuatuensis Rubio & Rolán, 2019
- Crossea veraspiralis Rubio & Rolán, 2019
- Crossea victori Poppe, Tagaro & Stahlschmidt, 2015

The following species were brought into synonymy:

- Crossea agulhasensis Thiele, J. 1925: synonym of Crossea striata Watson, 1883
- Crossea bellula A. Adams, 1865: synonym of Crosseola bellula (A. Adams, 1865) (original combination)
- Crossea cancellata Tenison-Woods, 1878: synonym of Crosseola cancellata (Tenison Woods, 1878) (original combination)
- Crossea carinata Hedley, 1903: synonym of Cirsonella carinata (Hedley, 1903)
- Crossea concinna Angas, 1867: synonym of Crosseola concinna (Angas, 1867)
- Crossea consobrina May, 1915: synonym of Crosseola concinna (Angas, 1867)
- Crossea glabella Murdoch, 1908: synonym of Conjectura glabella (Murdoch, 1908)
- Crossea inverta Hedley, 1907: synonym of Crosseola inverta (Hedley, 1907) (original combination)
- Crossea labiata Tenison-Woods, 1876: synonym of Dolicrossea labiata (Tenison-Woods, 1876)
- Crossea naticoides Hedley, C., 1907: synonym of Cirsonella naticoides (Hedley, 1907); synonym of Cirsonella weldii (Tenison-Woods, 1877)
