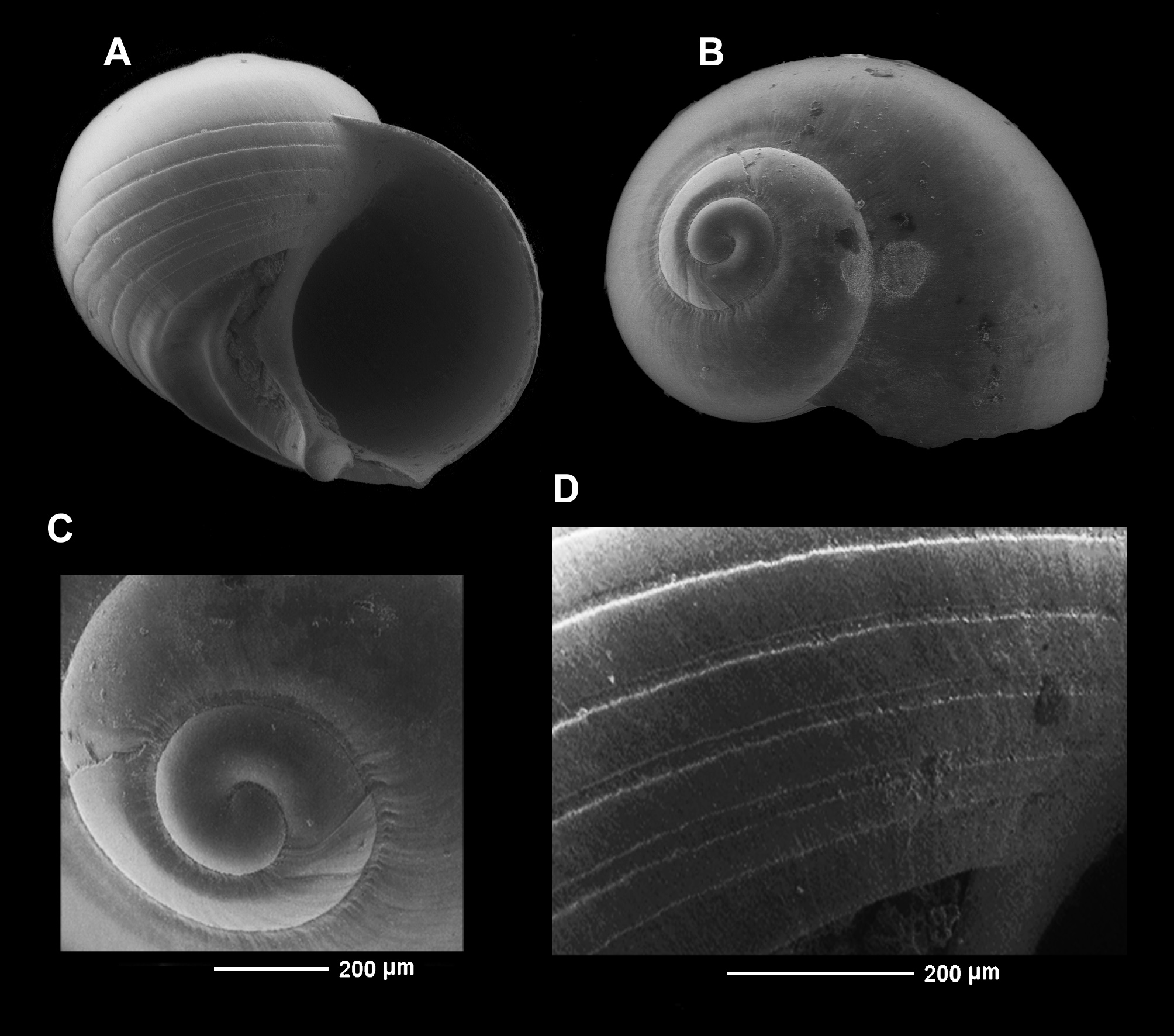
- Shell of Conjectura solomonensis (holotype at MNHN, Paris)

Scientific classification
- Kingdom: Animalia
- Phylum: Mollusca
- Class: Gastropoda
- Subclass: Vetigastropoda
- Order: Trochida
- Superfamily: Trochoidea
- Family: Conradiidae
- Genus: Conjectura; Finlay, 1926

Type species
- Crossea glabella R. Murdoch, 1905

= Conjectura =

Conjectura Temporal range: Miocene to Recent

Genus of gastropods

Conjectura is a genus of very small sea snails or micromolluscs, marine gastropod molluscs in the family Conradiidae.

== Species ==
Species within the genus Conjectura include:

- Conjectura agulhasensis (Thiele, 1925)
- Conjectura glabella (Murdoch, 1908)
- Conjectura solomonensis Rubio & Rolán, 2020

Species brought into synonymy

- Conjectura atypica Powell, 1937: synonym of Acremodontina atypica (Powell, 1937)
- Conjectura carinata Powell, 1940: synonym of Acremodontina carinata (Powell, 1940)
- † Conjectura congrua Laws, 1941: synonym of † Cirsonella congrua (Laws, 1941) (original combination)
- Conjectura poutama Smith, 1962: synonym of Acremodontina poutama (E. C. Smith, 1962)
- † Conjectura proava Marwick, 1931: synonym of † Cirsonella proava (Marwick, 1931) (original combination)
