= Crosseola favosa =

Scientific classification
- Kingdom: Animalia
- Phylum: Mollusca
- Class: Gastropoda
- Subclass: Vetigastropoda
- Order: Trochida
- Superfamily: Trochoidea
- Family: Conradiidae
- Genus: Crosseola
- Species: C. favosa

Binomial name
- Crosseola favosa Powell, 1937

Species of gastropod

Crosseola favosa is a species of small sea snail or micromollusc, a marine gastropod mollusc in the family Conradiidae.

== Description ==
The height of the shell attains 1.65 mm, its diameter 1.4 mm.

== Distribution ==
This species is endemic to Three Kings Islands, New Zealand.
