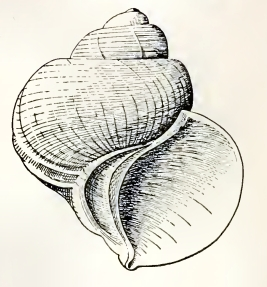
- Original drawing of a shell of Crossea gatliffi

Scientific classification
- Kingdom: Animalia
- Phylum: Mollusca
- Class: Gastropoda
- Subclass: Vetigastropoda
- Order: Trochida
- Superfamily: Trochoidea
- Family: Conradiidae
- Genus: Crossea
- Species: C. gatliffi

Binomial name
- Crossea gatliffi Hedley, 1902

= Crossea gatliffi =

Species of gastropod

Crossea gatliffi is a species of small sea snail or micromollusc, a marine gastropod mollusc in the family Conradiidae.

== Description ==
(Original description by Charles Hedley) The height of the shell attains 1.16 mm, its diameter 1.1 mm. The small, thin shell has a globose-conical shape with four whorls and an elevated spire. The basal funicle is slightly developed. Its colour is white (perhaps bleached ?).

Sculpture:The body whorl shows fine, close spiral threads of which every fourth is larger. At irregular intervals incipient varices traverse the whorl. On the penultimate whorl the spiral sculpture is more coarse and distant. The umbilicus is narrow, bordered by a slight rib, which, continuing to the anterior extremity, is there notched by the pseudocanal. The aperture is oval. The thin outer lip is everted.

The thin shell, lack of longitudinal sculpture, tabulated whorls, and feeble basal funicule distinguish it.

== Distribution ==
This marine species is endemic to Australia. It occurs off the Northern Territory and Queensland
