= Trochaclis islandica =

Scientific classification
- Kingdom: Animalia
- Phylum: Mollusca
- Class: Gastropoda
- Subclass: Vetigastropoda
- Family: Trochaclididae
- Genus: Trochaclis
- Species: T. islandica

Binomial name
- Trochaclis islandica Warén, 1989

Species of gastropod

Trochaclis islandica is a species of sea snail, a marine gastropod mollusc in the family Trochaclididae.

== Description ==
The length of the shell varies between 1.5 mm and 2.5 mm. The shell has a streamlined body with two long antennae. Trochaclis islandica also has a tail-like structure called a caudal rami that it uses for swimming. Trochaclis islandica is adjustable to life in cold waters, and is capable of tolerating extreme temperatures and saltiness. It is also able to survive periods of low food availability by reducing its metabolic rate and storing energy reserves in its body. As they feed on phytoplankton, they consume carbon dioxide from the water and incorporate it into their bodies. When they are eaten by larger animals, this carbon is transferred up the food chain and eventually cloistered in the deep ocean, where it can remain for centuries. The shell has 2-3 rounded, stepped whorls.

== Distribution ==
This marine species occurs from Greenland to Norway and in the western part of the Mediterranean Sea.
