= Trochaclis calva =

Scientific classification
- Kingdom: Animalia
- Phylum: Mollusca
- Class: Gastropoda
- Subclass: Vetigastropoda
- Family: Trochaclididae
- Genus: Trochaclis
- Species: T. calva

Binomial name
- Trochaclis calva Marshall, 1995

Species of gastropod

Trochaclis calva is a species of sea snail, a marine gastropod mollusk in the family Trochaclididae.
