= Crosseola bollonsi =

Scientific classification
- Kingdom: Animalia
- Phylum: Mollusca
- Class: Gastropoda
- Subclass: Vetigastropoda
- Order: Trochida
- Superfamily: Trochoidea
- Family: Conradiidae
- Genus: Crosseola
- Species: C. bollonsi

Binomial name
- Crosseola bollonsi Dell, 1956

Species of gastropod

Crosseola bollonsi is a species of minute sea snail, also known as a micromollusc, belonging to the family Conradiidae. It is a marine gastropod mollusc that inhabits oceanic waters. Like other members of its genus, Crosseola bollonsi is characterized by its small, coiled shell and its adaptation to benthic marine environments.

== Description ==
The height of the shell attains 4 mm, its diameter 3.3 mm.

== Distribution ==
This species is endemic to the North Cape, New Zealand.
