= Acremodontina simplex =

Scientific classification
- Kingdom: Animalia
- Phylum: Mollusca
- Class: Gastropoda
- Subclass: Vetigastropoda
- Superfamily: Seguenzioidea
- Family: Trochaclididae
- Genus: Acremodontina
- Species: A. simplex

Binomial name
- Acremodontina simplex (Powell, 1937)

Synonyms
- Cirsonella simplex Powell, 1937

Species of gastropod

Acremodontina simplex is a species of sea snail, a marine gastropod mollusk in the family Trochaclididae, the false top snails.

== Description ==
The length of the shell attains 1.4 mm, its diameter is 1.75 mm.

== Distribution ==
This marine species is endemic to New Zealand and occurs off Three Kings Islands and northwest North Island.
