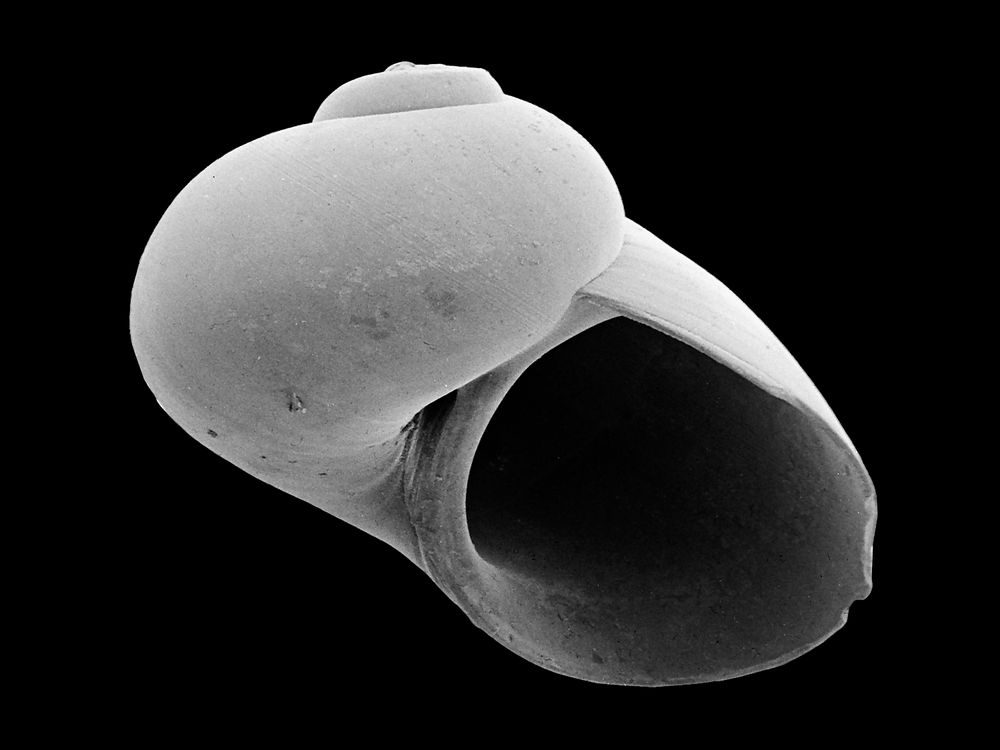
- Shell of Acremodontina magna (holotype at the Museum of New Zealand)

Scientific classification
- Kingdom: Animalia
- Phylum: Mollusca
- Class: Gastropoda
- Subclass: Vetigastropoda
- Superfamily: Seguenzioidea
- Family: Trochaclididae
- Genus: Acremodontina
- Species: A. magna

Binomial name
- Acremodontina magna Marshall, 1995

= Acremodontina magna =

Species of gastropod

Acremodontina magna is a species of sea snail, a marine gastropod mollusk in the family Trochaclididae, the false top snails.

== Description ==
The length of the shell attains 3.35 mm, its diameter is 3.8 mm.

== Distribution ==
This marine species is endemic to New Zealand and occurs off Three Kings Islands at a depth of 800 m.
