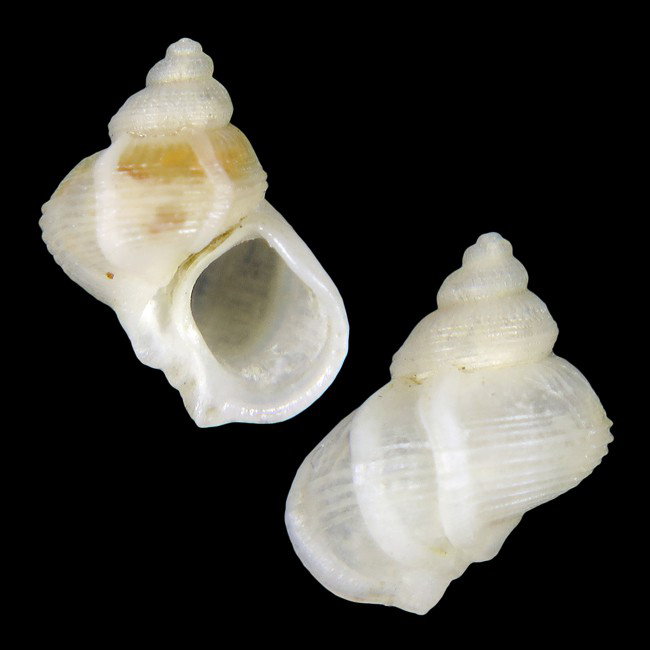

Scientific classification
- Kingdom: Animalia
- Phylum: Mollusca
- Class: Gastropoda
- Subclass: Vetigastropoda
- Order: Trochida
- Family: Conradiidae
- Genus: Crossea
- Species: C. victori

Binomial name
- Crossea victori Poppe, Tagaro & Stahlschmidt, 2015

= Crossea victori =

Species of gastropod

Crossea victori is a species of sea snail, a marine gastropod mollusk in the family Conradiidae.

== Description ==
The length of the shell attains 3.5 mm.

== Distribution ==
This marine species occurs off the Philippines.

== Original description ==
- Poppe G.T., Tagaro S.P. & Stahlschmidt P. (2015). New shelled molluscan species from the central Philippines I. Visaya. 4(3): 15-59 page(s): 21, pl. 5 figs 1–2.
