= Conradia cingulifera =

Scientific classification
- Kingdom: Animalia
- Phylum: Mollusca
- Class: Gastropoda
- Subclass: Vetigastropoda
- Order: Trochida
- Superfamily: Trochoidea
- Family: Conradiidae
- Genus: Conradia
- Species: C. cingulifera

Binomial name
- Conradia cingulifera A. Adams, 1860

Species of gastropod

Conradia cingulifera is a species of small sea snail or micromollusc, a marine gastropod mollusc belonging to the family Conradiidae.

== Distribution ==
This marine species occurs off the coast of Japan.
