= Crosseola cuvieriana =

Scientific classification
- Kingdom: Animalia
- Phylum: Mollusca
- Class: Gastropoda
- Subclass: Vetigastropoda
- Order: Trochida
- Superfamily: Trochoidea
- Family: Conradiidae
- Genus: Crosseola
- Species: C. cuvieriana

Binomial name
- Crosseola cuvieriana (Mestayer, 1919)

Synonyms
- Crossea cuvieriana Mestayer, 1919

Species of gastropod

Crosseola cuvieriana is a species of small sea snail or micromollusc, a marine gastropod mollusc in the family Conradiidae.

== Description ==
The height of the shell attains 3 mm, its diameter 3.4 mm.

== Distribution ==
This marine species is endemic to Cuvier Island, New Zealand.
