= Crossea gemmata =

Scientific classification
- Kingdom: Animalia
- Phylum: Mollusca
- Class: Gastropoda
- Subclass: Vetigastropoda
- Order: Trochida
- Superfamily: Trochoidea
- Family: Conradiidae
- Genus: Crossea
- Species: C. gemmata

Binomial name
- Crossea gemmata Hedley, 1912

Species of gastropod

Crossea gemmata is a species of small sea snail or micromollusc, a marine gastropod mollusc in the family Conradiidae.

== Distribution ==
This marine species is endemic to Australia. It occurs off the Northern Territory.
