= Austrotrochaclis ponderi =

Scientific classification
- Kingdom: Animalia
- Phylum: Mollusca
- Class: Gastropoda
- Subclass: Vetigastropoda
- Family: Ataphridae
- Genus: Austrotrochaclis
- Species: A. ponderi

Binomial name
- Austrotrochaclis ponderi Marshall, 1995

Species of gastropod

Austrotrochaclis ponderi is a species of sea snail, a marine gastropod mollusk in the family Ataphridae, the pyrams and their allies.
