= Acremodonta crassicosta =

Scientific classification
- Kingdom: Animalia
- Phylum: Mollusca
- Class: Gastropoda
- Subclass: Vetigastropoda
- Family: Ataphridae
- Genus: Acremodonta
- Species: A. crassicosta

Binomial name
- Acremodonta crassicosta (Powell, 1937)

Synonyms
- Thoristella crassicosta Powell, 1937 (basionym)

Species of gastropod

Acremodonta crassicosta is a species of minute, deep-water sea snail, a marine gastropod mollusc or micromollusk in the family Ataphridae, the false top snails or false top shells.

== Distribution ==
This species is endemic to the deeper waters around New Zealand's Three Kings Islands.
