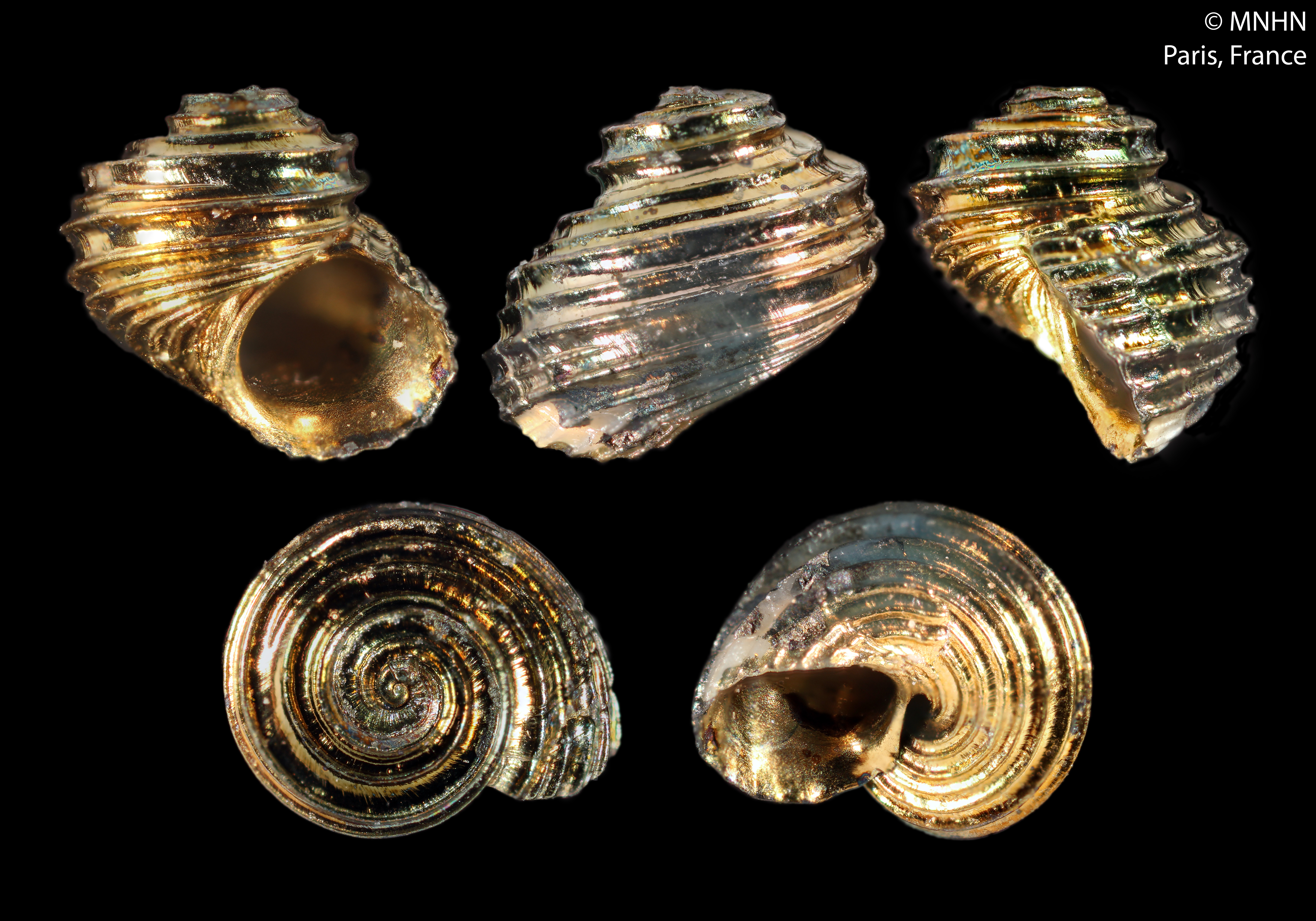
- Shell of Acremodontina boucheti (holotype at the MNHN, Paris)

Scientific classification
- Kingdom: Animalia
- Phylum: Mollusca
- Class: Gastropoda
- Subclass: Vetigastropoda
- Superfamily: Seguenzioidea
- Family: Trochaclididae
- Genus: Acremodontina
- Species: A. boucheti

Binomial name
- Acremodontina boucheti Marshall, 1995

= Acremodontina boucheti =

Species of gastropod

Acremodontina boucheti is a species of sea snail, a marine gastropod mollusk in the family Trochaclididae, the false top snails.

== Distribution ==
This marine species occurs off south New Caledonia at a depth of 500 m.
