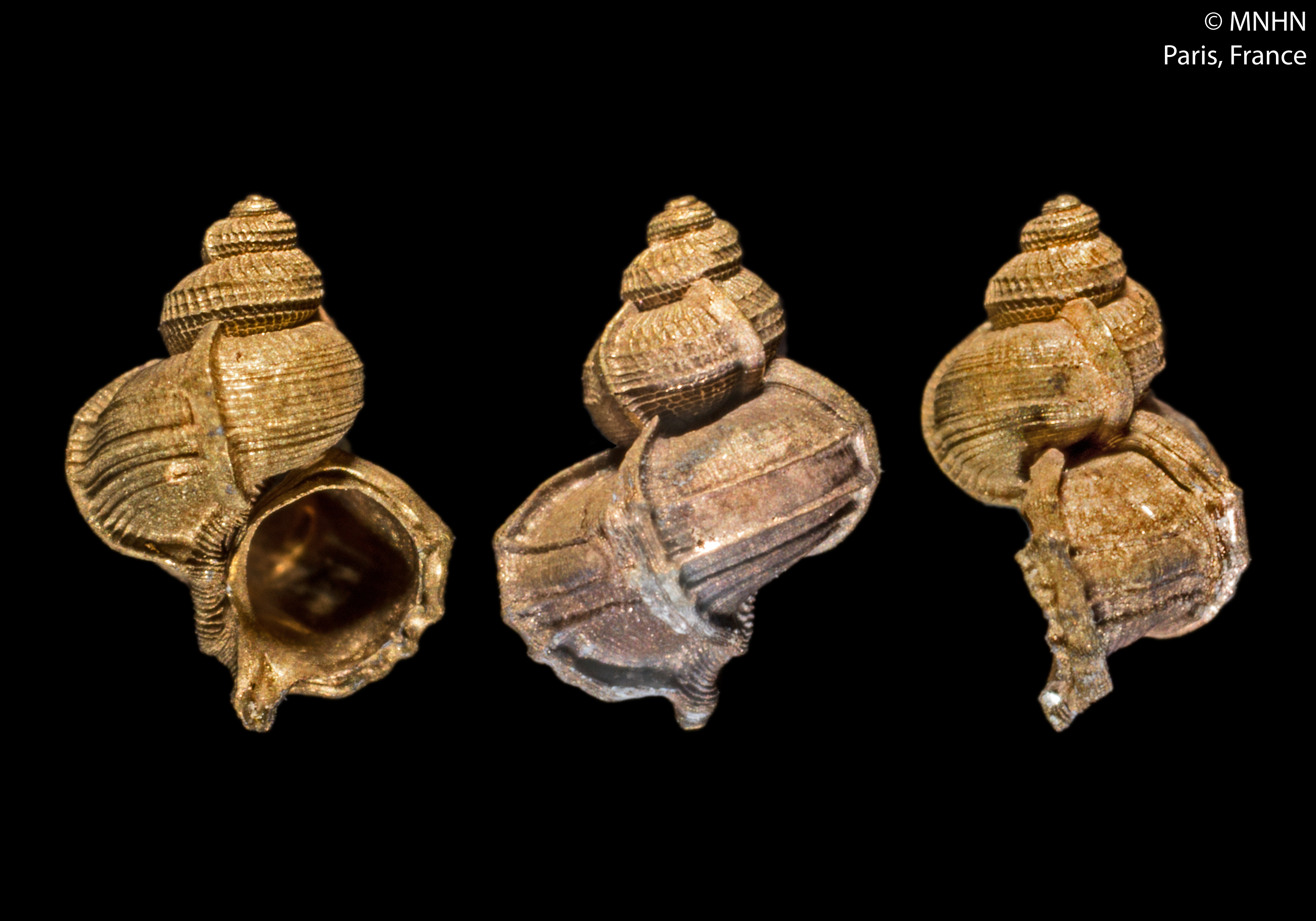
- Shell of Crossea miranda (syntype at MNHN, Paris)

Scientific classification
- Kingdom: Animalia
- Phylum: Mollusca
- Class: Gastropoda
- Subclass: Vetigastropoda
- Order: Trochida
- Superfamily: Trochoidea
- Family: Conradiidae
- Genus: Crossea
- Species: C. miranda

Binomial name
- Crossea miranda A. Adams, 1865

Synonyms
- Crosseia miranda A. Adams, 1865

= Crossea miranda =

Species of gastropod

Crossea miranda is a species of small sea snail or micromollusc, a marine gastropod mollusc in the family Conradiidae.

== Description ==
The height of the white shell varies between 3 mm and 6 mm. It contains 3-4 whorls that increase rapidly in size. They are very convex and spirally striate. They contain thin, low, longitudinal, not synchronized varices; this makes it unusual. The aperture is produced below.

== Distribution ==
This marine species occurs off New Zealand and Japan.
