= Trochaclis versiliensis =

Scientific classification
- Kingdom: Animalia
- Phylum: Mollusca
- Class: Gastropoda
- Subclass: Vetigastropoda
- Family: Trochaclididae
- Genus: Trochaclis
- Species: T. versiliensis

Binomial name
- Trochaclis versiliensis Warén, Carrozza & Rocchini in Warén, 1992

Species of gastropod

Trochaclis versiliensis is a species of sea snail, a marine gastropod mollusc in the family Trochaclididae.

== Description ==
The length of the shell varies between 1.2 mm and 1.7 mm.

== Distribution ==
This marine species occurs in the western part of the Mediterranean Sea and the adjacent region of the Atlantic Ocean.
