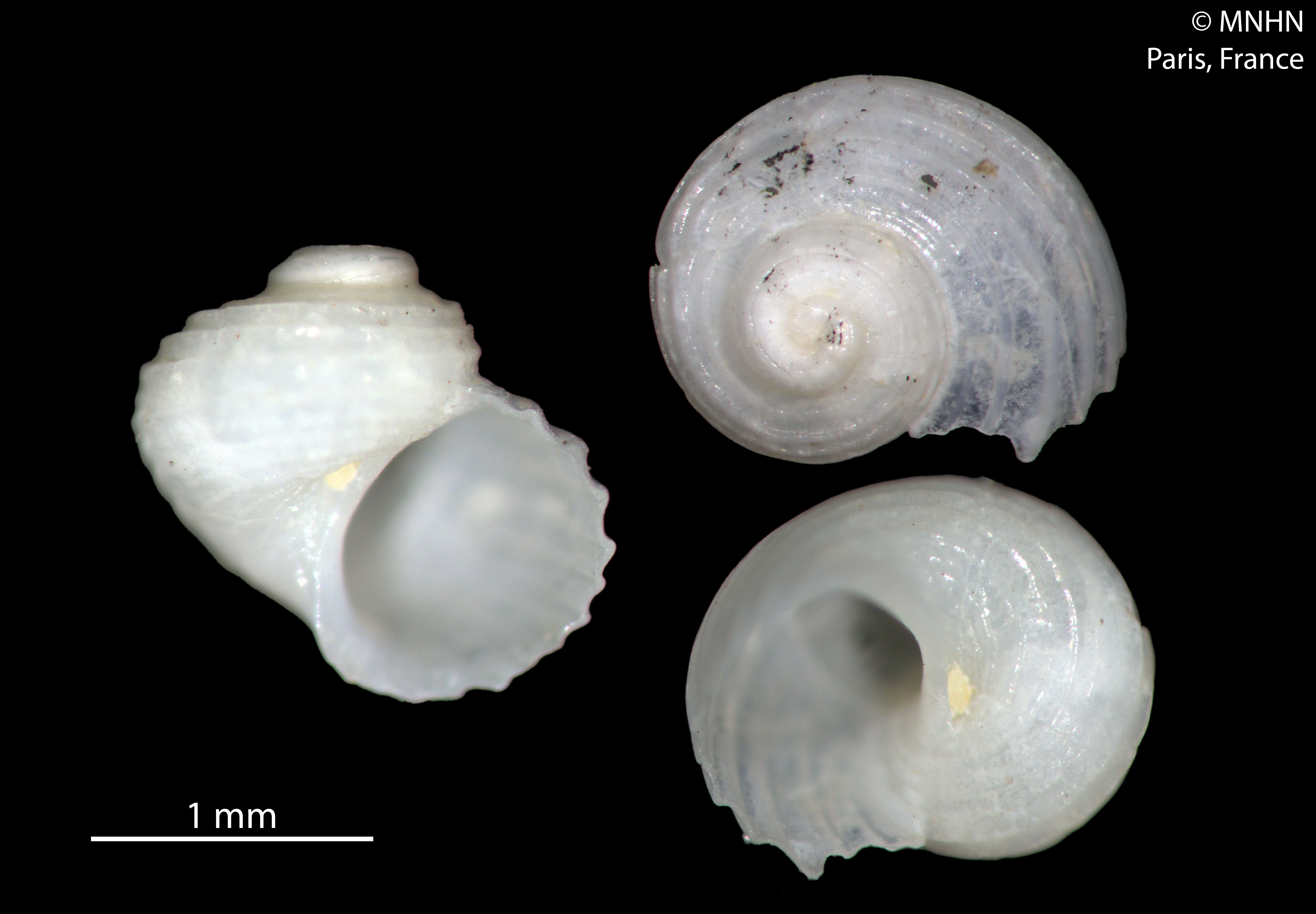
- Shell of Acremodontina varicosa (paratype at MNHN, Paris)

Scientific classification
- Kingdom: Animalia
- Phylum: Mollusca
- Class: Gastropoda
- Subclass: Vetigastropoda
- Superfamily: Seguenzioidea
- Family: Trochaclididae
- Genus: Acremodontina
- Species: A. varicosa

Binomial name
- Acremodontina varicosa Marshall, 1995

= Acremodontina varicosa =

Species of gastropod

Acremodontina varicosa is a species of sea snail, a marine gastropod mollusk in the family Trochaclididae, the false top snails.

== Description ==
The length of the shell attains 2.67 mm, its diameter is 2.57 mm.

== Distribution ==
This marine species is endemic to New Zealand and occurs off northwest of Three Kings Islands.

Fossils have been found in Pliocene strata on Pitt Island, Chatham Islands.
