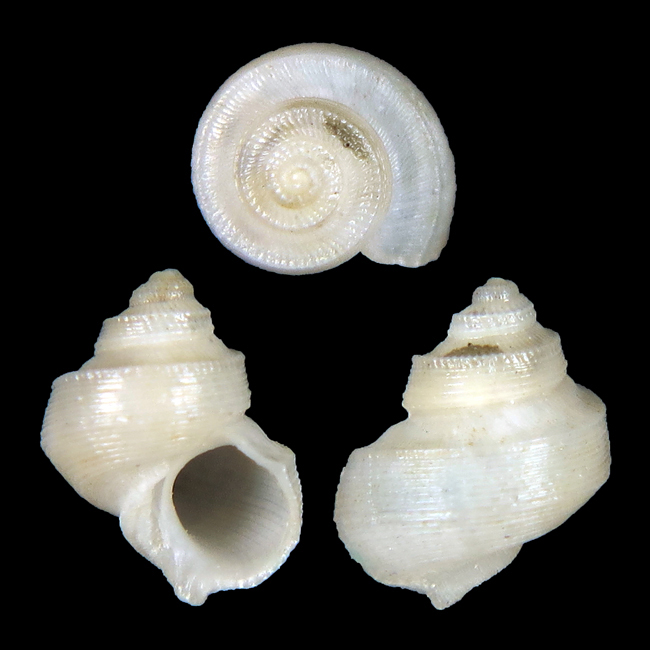
- Shell of Crosseola escondida

Scientific classification
- Kingdom: Animalia
- Phylum: Mollusca
- Class: Gastropoda
- Subclass: Vetigastropoda
- Order: Trochida
- Family: Conradiidae
- Genus: Crosseola
- Species: C. escondida

Binomial name
- Crosseola escondida (Poppe, Tagaro & Goto, 2018)

Synonyms
- Lophocochlias escondidus Poppe, Tagaro & Goto, 2018 (original combination)

= Crosseola escondida =

Species of gastropod

Crosseola escondida is a species of sea snail, a marine gastropod mollusk in the family Conradiidae.

== Distribution ==
This marine species occurs off the Philippines.
