= Crosseola intertexta =

Conservation status
- Naturally Uncommon (NZ TCS)

Scientific classification
- Kingdom: Animalia
- Phylum: Mollusca
- Class: Gastropoda
- Subclass: Vetigastropoda
- Order: Trochida
- Superfamily: Trochoidea
- Family: Conradiidae
- Genus: Crosseola
- Species: C. intertexta

Binomial name
- Crosseola intertexta Powell, 1937

Species of gastropod

Crosseola intertexta is a microbenthic species of small sea snail or micromollusc, a marine gastropod mollusc in the family Conradiidae.

== Description ==
The height of the shell attains 1.8 mm, its diameter is 1.65 mm.

== Distribution ==
This species is endemic to Three Kings Islands, New Zealand, with a possible distribution including near and around New Zealand's North Island or around New Zealand in general.
