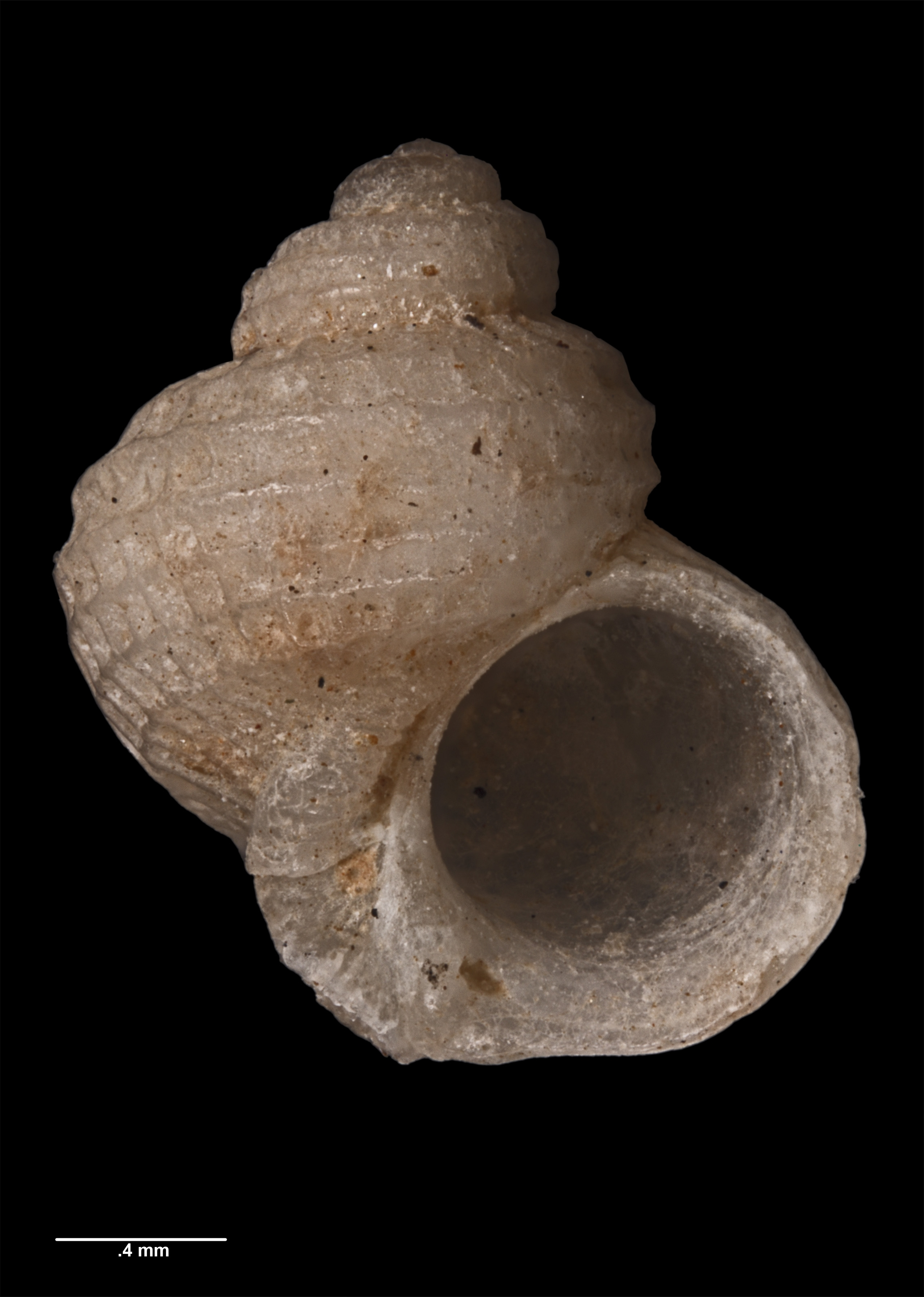
- Shell of Crosseola errata (specimen at the Auckland War Memorial Museum)

Scientific classification
- Kingdom: Animalia
- Phylum: Mollusca
- Class: Gastropoda
- Subclass: Vetigastropoda
- Order: Trochida
- Superfamily: Trochoidea
- Family: Conradiidae
- Genus: Crosseola
- Species: C. errata

Binomial name
- Crosseola errata Finlay, 1927

Synonyms
- Crossea cuvieriana Mestayer, 1919

= Crosseola errata =

Species of gastropod

Crosseola errata is a species of small sea snail or micromollusc, a marine gastropod mollusc in the family Conradiidae.

== Description ==
The height of the shell attains 2 mm, its diameter is 1.9 mm.

Their functional type is Benthos.

Their feeding type is deposit feeder and are also grazers.

== Distribution ==
This marine species is endemic off Northland, New Zealand.
