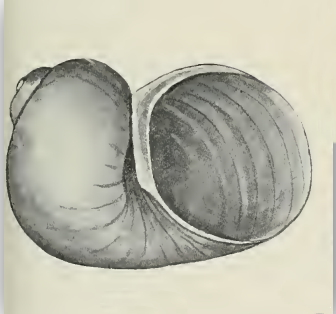
- Shell of Acremodontina translucida (holotype)

Scientific classification
- Kingdom: Animalia
- Phylum: Mollusca
- Class: Gastropoda
- Subclass: Vetigastropoda
- Superfamily: Seguenzioidea
- Family: Trochaclididae
- Genus: Acremodontina
- Species: A. translucida

Binomial name
- Acremodontina translucida (May, 1915)

Synonyms
- Cirsonella translucida May, 1915

= Acremodontina translucida =

Species of gastropod

Acremodontina translucida is a species of sea snail, a marine gastropod mollusk in the family Trochaclididae, the ataphrids.

== Description ==
The shell grows to a length of 2.5 mm, its greatest diameter 2.5 mm, least diameter 2 mm.

(Original description) The small, white shell is translucid and smooth, except for growth lines, elevated.

The shell contains three whorls. The only whorl of the protoconch is very minute, the others are rapidly increasing. The body whorl is very large. The aperture is large, nearly round and slightly pointed above. The columellar lip expands over a deep, narrow umbilicus, sometimes covering it, below which it suddenly contracts, and the expansion is very slight. The outer lip is simple, thin and expanded above.

== Distribution ==
This marine species is endemic to Australia and occurs off Tasmania in the subtidal zone and offshore.
