= Conradia doliaris =

Scientific classification
- Kingdom: Animalia
- Phylum: Mollusca
- Class: Gastropoda
- Subclass: Vetigastropoda
- Order: Trochida
- Superfamily: Trochoidea
- Family: Conradiidae
- Genus: Conradia
- Species: C. doliaris

Binomial name
- Conradia doliaris A. Adams, 1863

Synonyms
- Fossarus (Gottoina) doliaris A. Adams, 1863

Species of gastropod

Conradia doliaris is a species of small sea snail or micromollusc, a marine gastropod mollusc in the family Conradiidae.

== Description ==
(Original description by Arthur Adams) The height of the shell attains 2.5 mm. The dirty white shell has a turbinate shape with 4½ whorls and a profound umbilicus. The very thin shell contains distant transverse ridges, and the interstices are neatly cancellated. The aperture is nearly circular, and the sutures are deeply channeled. The thin lip is arcuated.

== Distribution ==
This marine species occurs off Japan.
