= Crossea alliciens =

Scientific classification
- Kingdom: Animalia
- Phylum: Mollusca
- Class: Gastropoda
- Subclass: Vetigastropoda
- Order: Trochida
- Superfamily: Trochoidea
- Family: Conradiidae
- Genus: Crossea
- Species: C. alliciens

Binomial name
- Crossea alliciens Melvill, 1910

Species of gastropod

Crossea alliciens is a species of small sea snail or micromollusc, a marine gastropod mollusc in the family Conradiidae.

== Distribution ==
This marine species occurs in the Gulf of Oman.
