= Trochaclis antarctica =

Scientific classification
- Kingdom: Animalia
- Phylum: Mollusca
- Class: Gastropoda
- Subclass: Vetigastropoda
- Family: Trochaclididae
- Genus: Trochaclis
- Species: T. antarctica

Binomial name
- Trochaclis antarctica Thiele, 1912

Species of gastropod

Trochaclis antarctica is a species of sea snail, a marine gastropod mollusc in the family Trochaclididae.

== Description ==
Trochaclis antarctica is a species of snails in the family Trochaclididae. They are native to Antarctica. They have sexual reproduction. The length of the shell varies between 2 mm and 5 mm.

== Distribution ==
This species occurs in Antarctic waters off the South Sandwich Islands, the South Shetlands, the Antarctic Peninsula, the Ross Sea, and the Weddell Sea.
