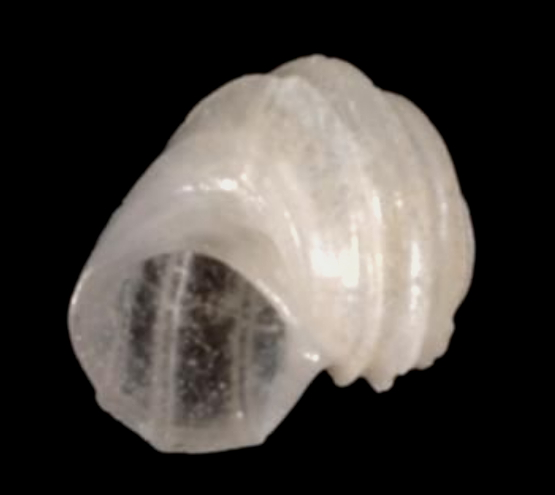
- Shell of Acremodontina alazon (holotype in the Australian MUseum)

Scientific classification
- Kingdom: Animalia
- Phylum: Mollusca
- Class: Gastropoda
- Subclass: Vetigastropoda
- Superfamily: Seguenzioidea
- Family: Trochaclididae
- Genus: Acremodontina
- Species: A. alazon

Binomial name
- Acremodontina alazon (Hedley, 1905)

Synonyms
- Liotia alazon Hedley, 1905 (superseded combination)

= Acremodontina alazon =

Species of gastropod

Acremodontina alazon is a species of sea snails, a marine gastropod mollusc in the family Trochaclididae, the false top snails.

== Description ==
The height of the shell attains 1.5 mm, its major diameter 1.75 mm, its minor diameter 1.37 mm.

(Original description) The minute shell is solid. It is turbinate, elevate, tricarinate, descending at the aperture and narrowly umbilicate. The surface is smooth and glossy. The colour of the shell is porcelain white.

The shell contains three whorls. The first forms the protoconch. The sculpture consists of three projecting lamellate keels revolving from the protoconch to the aperture. The third keel of the penultimate whorl is half covered by the suture of the following whorl. From the first keel, which runs along the shoulder, a nearly flat shelf extends to the suture. From the first to the third keel the side of the shell is nearly perpendicular. Around the umbilicus are three spiral cords. The aperture is oblique, angled above and rounded below. The outer lip is neither thickened nor reflected. The umbilicus is deep, narrow and contracted by the columella.

== Distribution ==
This marine species is endemic to Australia and occurs off New South Wales.
