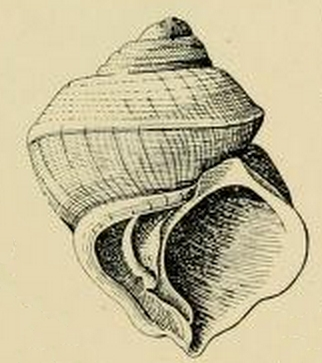
- Original drawing of a shell of Crossea biconica

Scientific classification
- Kingdom: Animalia
- Phylum: Mollusca
- Class: Gastropoda
- Subclass: Vetigastropoda
- Order: Trochida
- Superfamily: Trochoidea
- Family: Conradiidae
- Genus: Crossea
- Species: C. biconica

Binomial name
- Crossea biconica Hedley, 1902

= Crossea biconica =

Species of gastropod

Crossea biconica is a species of small sea snail or micromollusc, a marine gastropod mollusc in the family Conradiidae.

== Description ==
(Original description by Charles Hedley) The height of the shell attains 1.7 mm, its diameter 1.6 mm. The minute but solid, white shell has a biconical shape. Its base is greatly produced, the periphery keeled. The four whorls are somewhat turreted.

Sculpture : The first and second whorls are smooth, the third comparatively coarsely cancellated, the fourth contains dense fine spiral cords crossed by fainter growth lines which tend to bead the interstices. The base is two-thirds of the total height. The wide and deep umbilicus is bordered by a conspicuous ridge, and has an elevated funicle winding within. The oblique aperture is rhomboidal, channelled by the umbilical ridge, and with a gutter at the termination of the funicle. A heavy outstanding varix occurs a short distance behind the aperture.

The small size, produced base, and wide umbilicus are characters which distinguish this from other Australian members of the genus.

== Distribution ==
This marine species is endemic to Australia. It is found off the Northern Territory and Queensland
