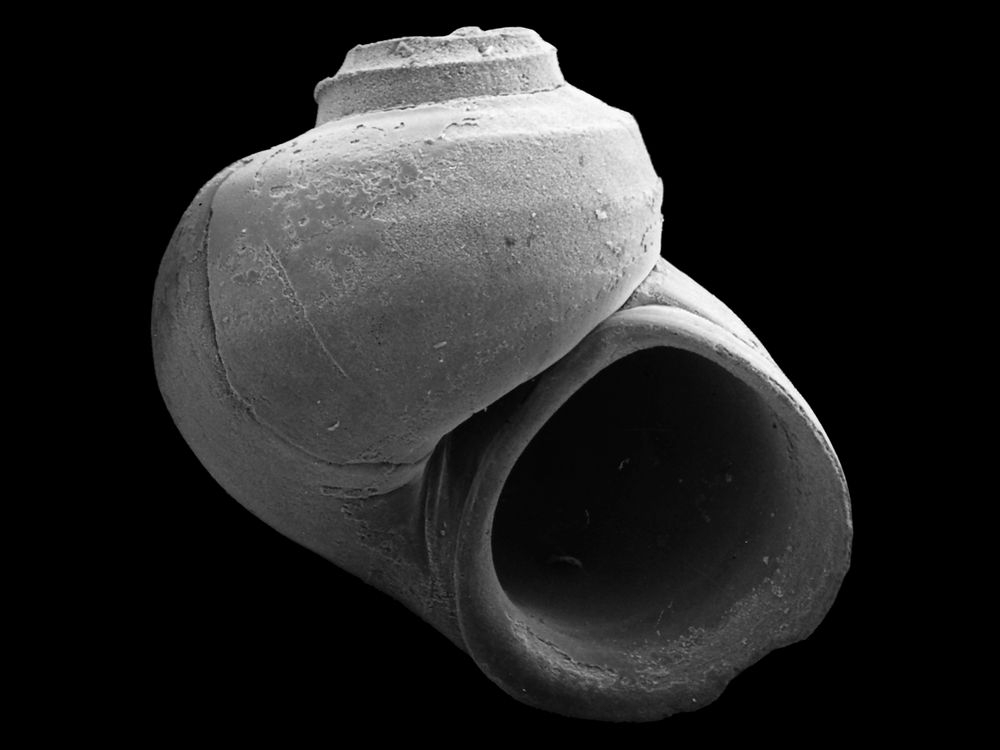
- Shell of Acremodontina kermadecensis (holotype at the Museum of New Zealand)

Scientific classification
- Kingdom: Animalia
- Phylum: Mollusca
- Class: Gastropoda
- Subclass: Vetigastropoda
- Superfamily: Seguenzioidea
- Family: Trochaclididae
- Genus: Acremodontina
- Species: A. kermadecensis

Binomial name
- Acremodontina kermadecensis Marshall, 1995

= Acremodontina kermadecensis =

Species of gastropod

Acremodontina kermadecensis is a species of sea snail, a marine gastropod mollusk in the family Trochaclididae, the false top snails.

== Description ==
The shell attains a length of 1.77 mm, its diameter 1.83 mm.

== Distribution ==
This marine species is endemic to New Zealand and occurs off Raoul Island, the Kermadec Islands.
