= Conjectura glabella =

Scientific classification
- Kingdom: Animalia
- Phylum: Mollusca
- Class: Gastropoda
- Subclass: Vetigastropoda
- Order: Trochida
- Superfamily: Trochoidea
- Family: Conradiidae
- Genus: Conjectura
- Species: C. glabella

Binomial name
- Conjectura glabella (Murdoch, 1908)

Synonyms
- Crossea glabella Murdoch, 1908

Species of gastropod

Conjectura glabella is a species of small sea snail or micromollusc, a marine gastropod mollusc in the family Conradiidae.

== Distribution ==
This marine species is endemic to New Zealand, (specifically around Stewart Island, the Foveaux Strait, the Otago Heads, and the Snares Islands).
