= Crosseola concinna =

- Original drawing of a shell of Crosseola concinna

Scientific classification
- Kingdom: Animalia
- Phylum: Mollusca
- Class: Gastropoda
- Subclass: Vetigastropoda
- Order: Trochida
- Superfamily: Trochoidea
- Family: Conradiidae
- Genus: Crosseola
- Species: C. concinna

Binomial name
- Crosseola concinna (Angas, 1867)

Synonyms
- Crossea consobrina May, W.L. 1916; Crossea concinna Angas, 1867 (original combination); Crosseola consobrina (May, 1915)

Species of gastropod

Crosseola concinna is a species of small sea snail or micromollusc, a marine gastropod mollusc in the family Conradiidae.

== Description ==
The minute, narrowly umbilicate, rather solid shell has a turbinate shape. It is white and semipellucid. The spire is raised, the suture is distinct. The five whorls are rounded, the first three transversely ribbed and longitudinally striated. The remainder are transversely punctate-striate. The umbilicus is bordered by a rounded callus. The circular aperture has a channelled angular projection in front. The outer lip is simple, the margin acute.

== Distribution ==
This marine species is endemic to Australia. It occurs in the sublittoral zone off New South Wales, South Australia, Tasmania and Victoria
