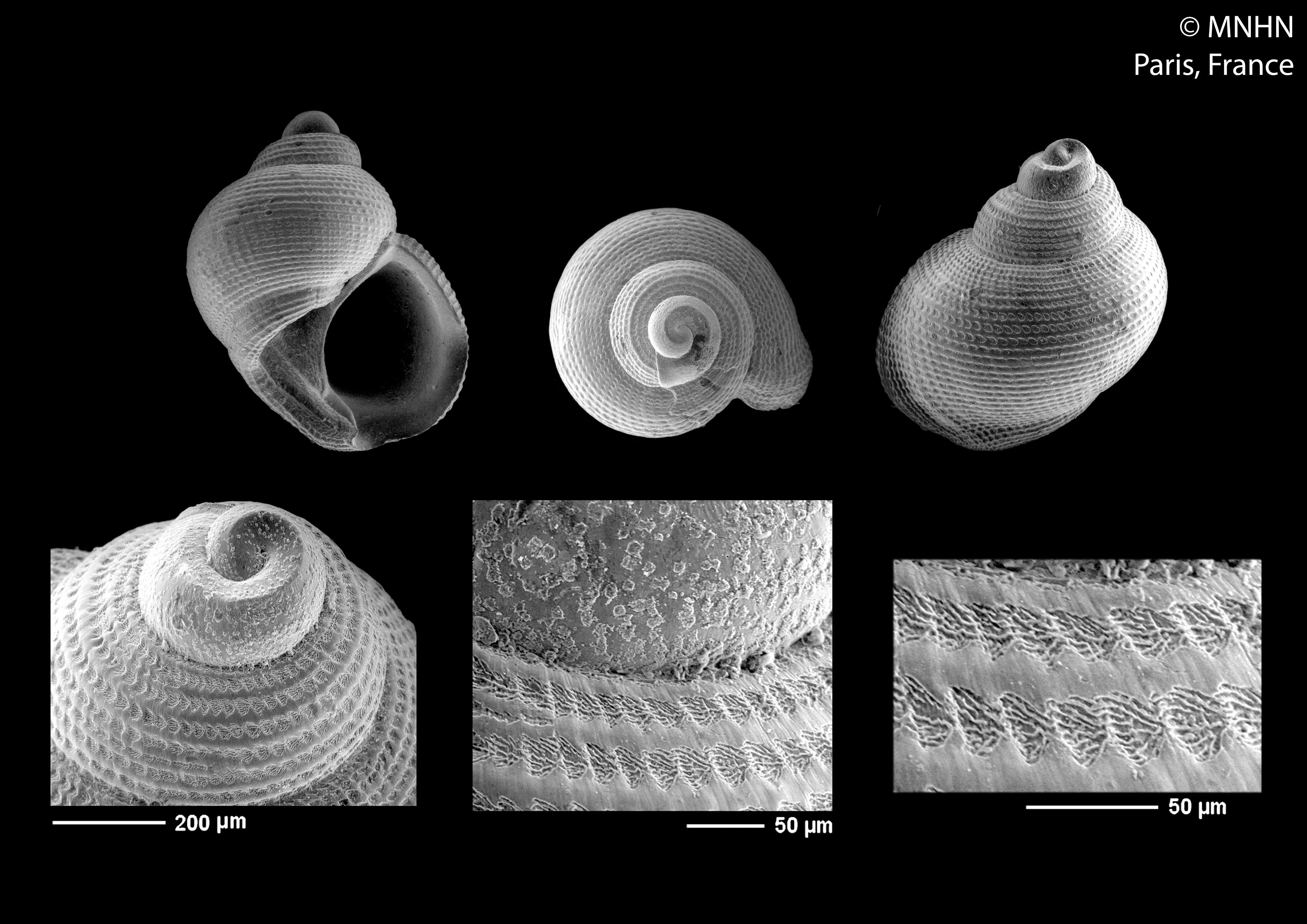
- Shell of Crossolida marquesensis (holotype at MNHN, Paris)

Scientific classification
- Kingdom: Animalia
- Phylum: Mollusca
- Class: Gastropoda
- Subclass: Vetigastropoda
- Order: Trochida
- Superfamily: Trochoidea
- Family: Conradiidae
- Genus: Crossolida; Rubio & Rolán, 2019

Type species
- Crossolida robusta Rubio & Rolán, 2019

= Crossolida =

Genus of gastropods

Crossolida is a genus of very small sea snails or micromolluscs, marine gastropod molluscs in the family Conradiidae.

== Species ==
Species within the genus Crossolida include:

- Crossolida marquesensis (Rubio, Rolán & Letourneux, 2017)
- Crossolida papuaensis Rubio & Rolán, 2019
- Crossolida robusta Rubio & Rolán, 2019
- Crossolida satispiralis Rubio & Rolán, 2019
