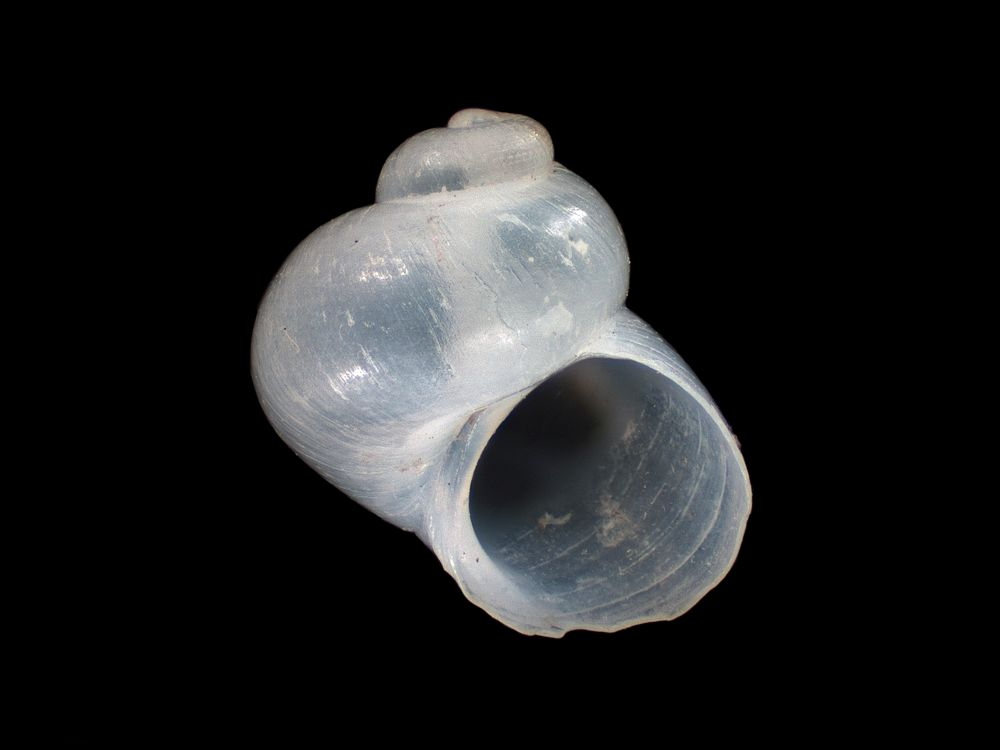
- Shell of Acremodontina poutama (holotype at the Museum of New Zealand)

Scientific classification
- Kingdom: Animalia
- Phylum: Mollusca
- Class: Gastropoda
- Subclass: Vetigastropoda
- Superfamily: Seguenzioidea
- Family: Trochaclididae
- Genus: Acremodontina
- Species: A. poutama

Binomial name
- Acremodontina poutama (E. C. Smith, 1962)

Synonyms
- Conjectura poutama E. C. Smith, 1962

= Acremodontina poutama =

Species of gastropod

Acremodontina poutama is a species of sea snail, a marine gastropod mollusk in the family Trochaclididae, the false top snails.

== Description ==
The length of the shell attains 2.0 mm, its diameter is 1.8 mm.

== Distribution ==
This marine species is endemic to New Zealand, where it occurs off Stewart Island, Snares Islands, and Otago.
