= Austrotrochaclis =

Scientific classification
- Kingdom: Animalia
- Phylum: Mollusca
- Class: Gastropoda
- Subclass: Vetigastropoda
- Family: Ataphridae
- Genus: Austrotrochaclis; B. A. Marshall, 1995

Genus of gastropods

Austrotrochaclis is a genus of sea snails, marine gastropod mollusks in the family Ataphridae, the false top snails.

== Species ==
Species within the genus Austrotrochaclis include:

- Austrotrochaclis ponderi Marshall, 1995
