= Crosseola striata =

Scientific classification
- Kingdom: Animalia
- Phylum: Mollusca
- Class: Gastropoda
- Subclass: Vetigastropoda
- Order: Trochida
- Superfamily: Trochoidea
- Family: Conradiidae
- Genus: Crosseola
- Species: C. striata

Binomial name
- Crosseola striata Watson, 1883

Synonyms
- Crossea agulhasensis Thiele, J. 1925

Species of gastropod

Crosseola striata is a species of small sea snail or micromollusc, a marine gastropod mollusc in the family Conradiidae.

== Description ==
(Original description by R. Boog Watson) The height of the shell attains 1.5 mm, its diameter 1.3 mm. The very small, porcellaneous white shell has a turbinate shape. It is spirally striated, with a raised, subscalar spire, a minute rounded apex, which is tabulated, with the extreme tip just visible, a tumid body whorl, and a small strongly bordered umbilicus.

Sculpture: Longitudinals—there are microscopic lines of growth which gather into puckers below the suture.

Spirals—there are furrows broadish and square-cut, parted by flat raised surfaces of about twice their breadth. These extend to below the periphery, but not to the base, the most of which is smooth. Round the umbilicus is a high raised thread, which relatively to the size of the shell is enormous.

The four whorls are well rounded, and a very little tabulated below the suture. The body whorl is tumid. The suture is strongly marked, but hardly impressed. The aperture is round, but a little gibbous, bluntly pointed above. The thin, well arched outer lip is scarcely patulous. The inner lip is regularly curved from the corner of the aperture to the point of the columella, which is arched, with a thin inner edge parting the aperture from the umbilicus and joining the outer lip, while round the umbilicus twists the strong marginal cord which runs out into a strong blunt tooth at the tip of the columella. The deep umbilicus is small but strongly marked.

== Distribution ==
This marine species occurs off South Africa and Australia (Queensland, Northern Territory)
