= Acremodonta =

Scientific classification
- Kingdom: Animalia
- Phylum: Mollusca
- Class: Gastropoda
- Subclass: Vetigastropoda
- Family: Ataphridae
- Genus: Acremodonta; B. A. Marshall, 1983

Type species
- Thoristella crassicosta Powell, 1937

Genus of gastropods

Acremodonta is a genus of sea snails, marine gastropod mollusks in the family Ataphridae.

The radula of species in this genus have very long and narrow teeth and dendritic cusps that are repeatedly divided.

== Species ==
Species within the genus Acremodonta include:

- Acremodonta crassicosta (Powell, 1937)
