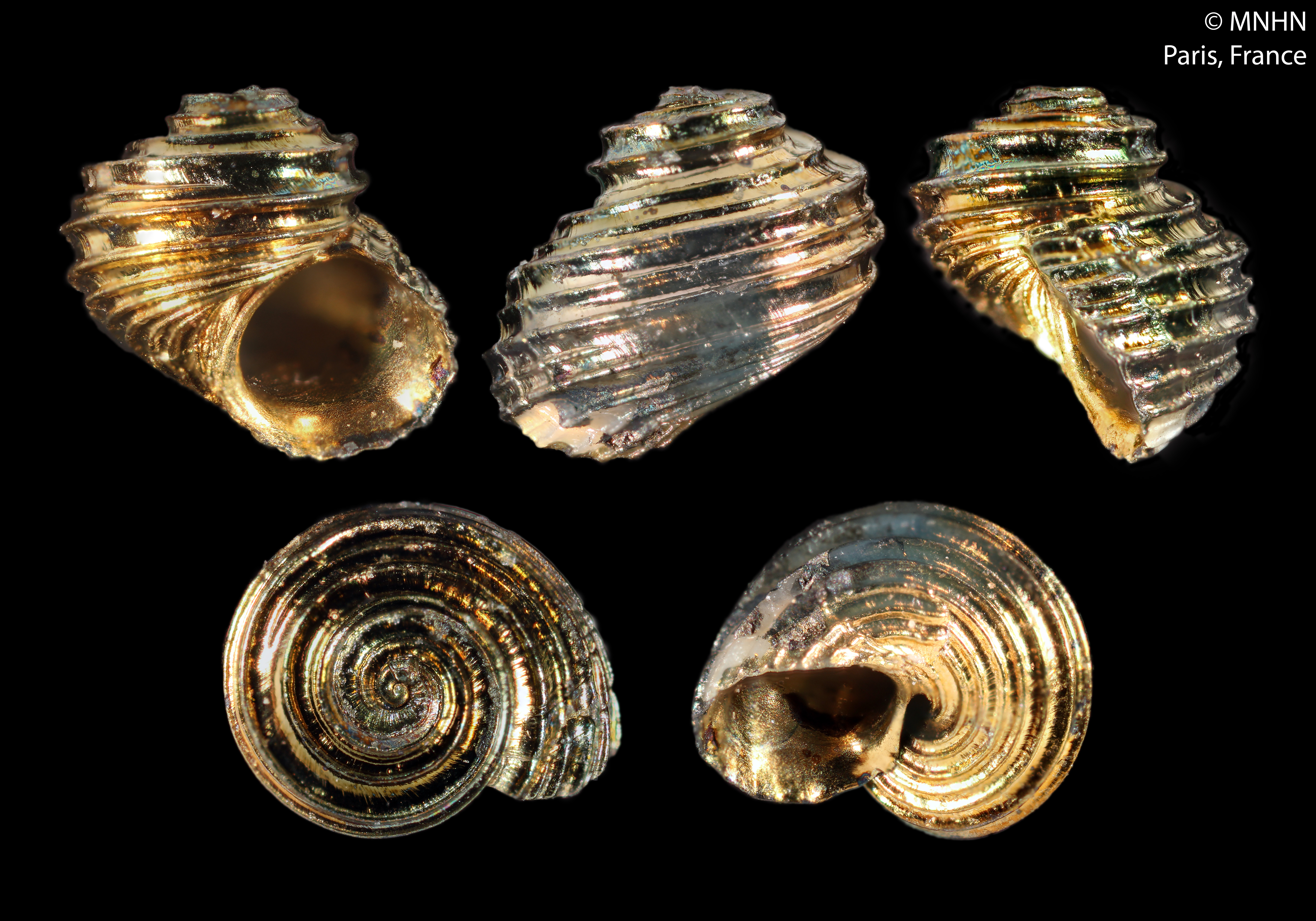
- Shell of Acremodontina boucheti

Scientific classification
- Kingdom: Animalia
- Phylum: Mollusca
- Class: Gastropoda
- Subclass: Vetigastropoda
- Superfamily: Seguenzioidea
- Family: Trochaclididae
- Genus: Acremodontina; B. A. Marshall, 1995

Type species
- Conjectura carinata A. W. B. Powell, 1940

= Acremodontina =

Genus of gastropods

Acremodontina is a genus of sea snails, marine gastropod mollusks in the family Trochaclididae.

== Distribution ==
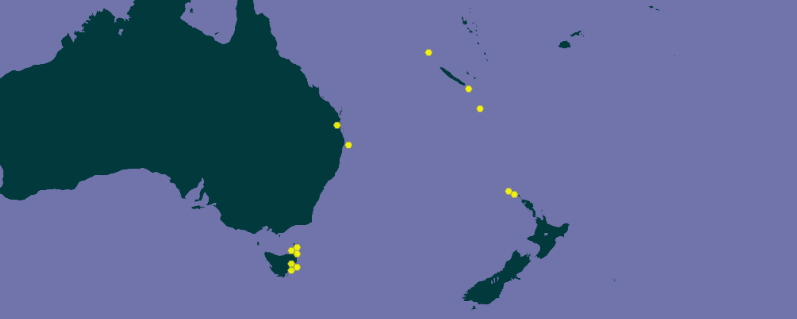
Distribution

This marine genus occurs off Australia (New South Wales, Tasmania), New Zealand and New Caledonia.

== Species ==
Species within the genus Acremodontina include:

- Acremodontina alazon (Hedley, 1905)
- Acremodontina atypica (Powell, 1937)
- Acremodontina boucheti Marshall, 1995
- Acremodontina carinata (Powell, 1940)
- Acremodontina kermadecensis Marshall, 1995
- Acremodontina magna Marshall, 1995
- Acremodontina poutama (E. C. Smith, 1962)
- Acremodontina simplex (Powell, 1937)
- Acremodontina translucida (May, 1915)
- Acremodontina varicosa Marshall, 1995
