= Crosseola cancellata =

Scientific classification
- Kingdom: Animalia
- Phylum: Mollusca
- Class: Gastropoda
- Subclass: Vetigastropoda
- Order: Trochida
- Superfamily: Trochoidea
- Family: Conradiidae
- Genus: Crosseola
- Species: C. cancellata

Binomial name
- Crosseola cancellata (Tenison-Woods, 1878)

Synonyms
- Crossea cancellata Tenison Woods, 1878 (original combination)

Species of mollusc

Crosseola cancellata is a species of small sea snail or micromollusc, a marine gastropod mollusc in the family Conradiidae.

== Description ==
(Original description by Tenison-Woods) The diameter of this minute, white shell scarcely attains 1.5 mm. The shining, turbinated shell contains three whorls which are beautifully cancellated by close spiral ribs and distinct oblique striae. The apex is smooth. The aperture is circular and conspicuously channelled above and below. Behind the inner lip there is a narrow groove forming a false umbilicus, then a rounded spiral rib, and then a broad regularly striate groove on the base.

== Distribution ==
This marine species is endemic to Australia. It occurs off South Australia, Tasmania and Victoria
