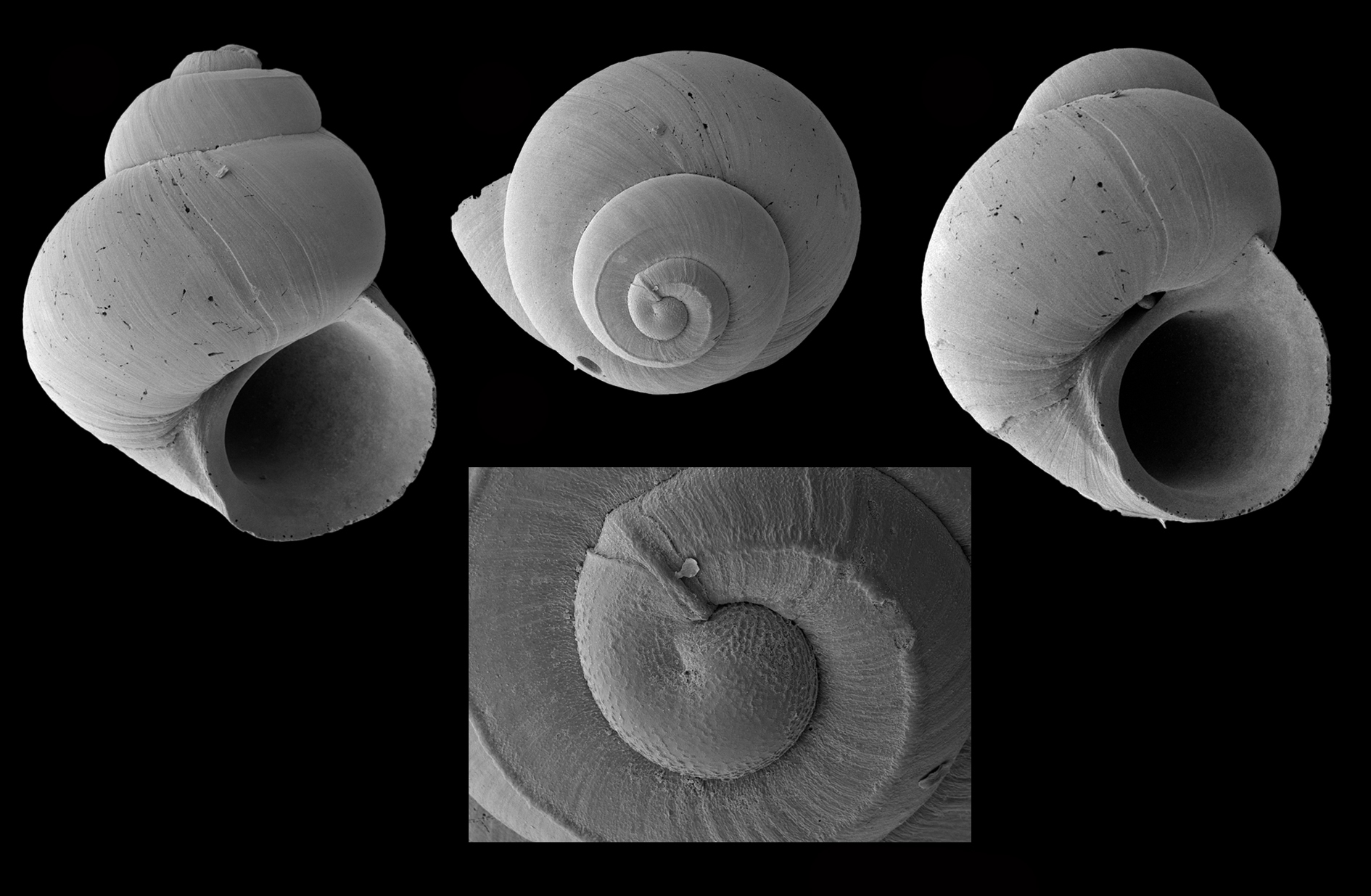
- Shell of Trochaclis fortis (holotype at MNHN, Paris)

Scientific classification
- Kingdom: Animalia
- Phylum: Mollusca
- Class: Gastropoda
- Subclass: Vetigastropoda
- Superfamily: Seguenzioidea
- Family: Trochaclididae
- Genus: Trochaclis; Thiele, 1912

Type species
- Trochaclis antarctica Thiele, 1912

= Trochaclis =

Genus of gastropods

Trochaclis is a genus of sea snails, marine gastropod molluscs in the family Trochaclididae.

== Species ==
Species within the genus Trochaclis include:

- Trochaclis antarctica Thiele, 1912
- Trochaclis attenuata Marshall, 1995
- † Trochaclis atypica (Laws, 1939)
- † Trochaclis bucina (Laws, 1941)
- Trochaclis calva Marshall, 1995
- Trochaclis carinata Hoffman, Gofas & Freiwald, 2020
- Trochaclis cristata Marshall, 1995
- Trochaclis elata Marshall, 1995
- Trochaclis fortis Hoffman, Gofas & Freiwald, 2020
- † Trochaclis isabellae Tabanelli, Bongiardino & Scarponi, 2017
- Trochaclis islandica Warén, 1989
- † Trochaclis kaiparica B. A. Marshall, 1995
- † Trochaclis morningtonensis B. A. Marshall, 1995
- Trochaclis platoensis Hoffman, Gofas & Freiwald, 2020
- Trochaclis regalis Marshall, 1995
- Trochaclis versiliensis Warén, Carrozza & Rocchini in Warén, 1992

Species brought into synonymy

- Trochaclis islandicus Warén, 1989: synonym of Trochaclis islandica Warén, 1989
