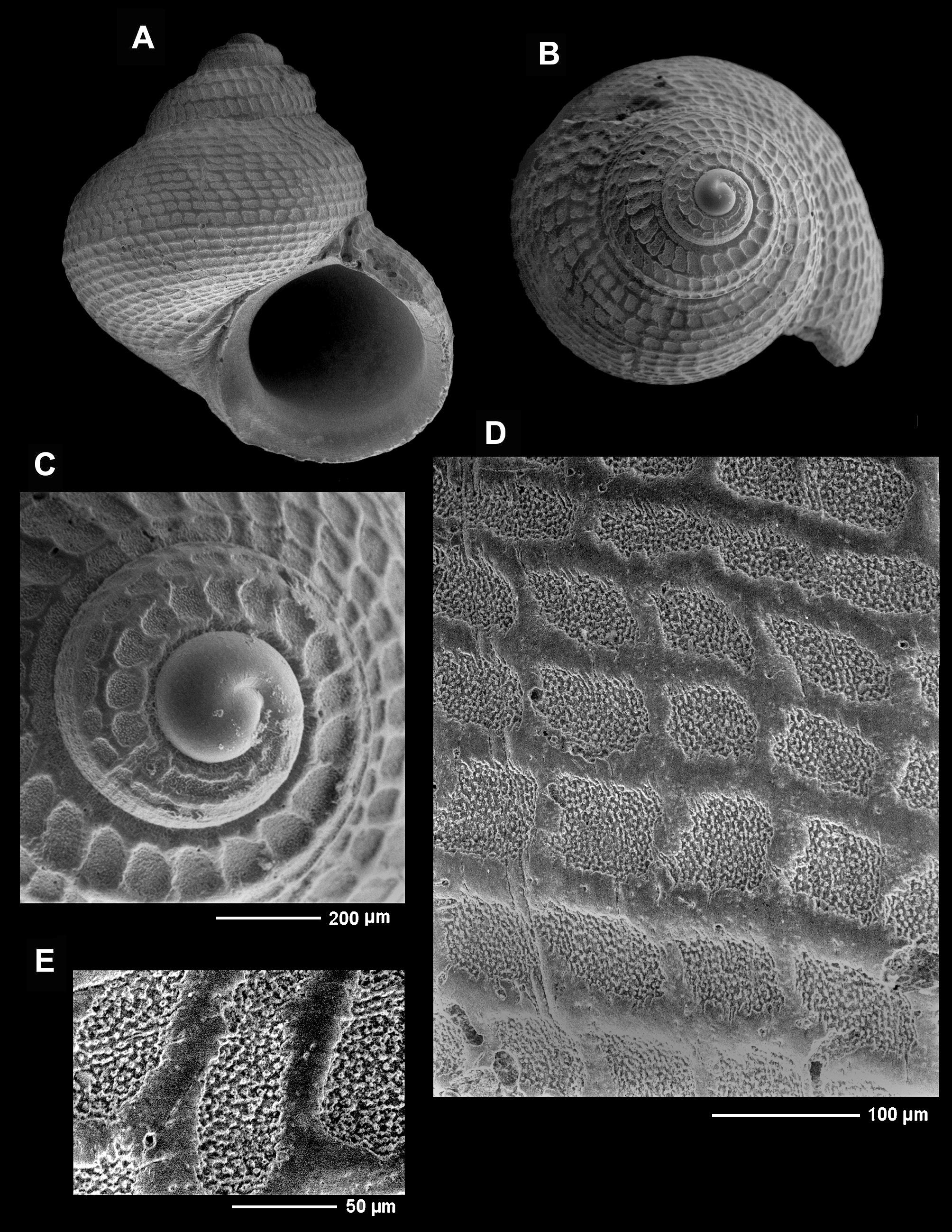
- Shell of Crosseola foveolata (specimen at MNHN, Paris)

Scientific classification
- Kingdom: Animalia
- Phylum: Mollusca
- Class: Gastropoda
- Subclass: Vetigastropoda
- Order: Trochida
- Superfamily: Trochoidea
- Family: Conradiidae
- Genus: Crosseola; Iredale, 1924

Type species
- Crossea concinna Angas, G.F., 1867

= Crosseola =

Crosseola Temporal range: Miocene to Recent

Genus of gastropods

Crosseola is a genus of minute sea snail or micromollusc, a marine gastropod mollusc in the family Conradiidae.

== Species ==
Species within the genus Crosseola include:

- Crosseola anodyna Rubio & Rolán, 2019
- Crosseola axialis Rubio & Rolán, 2019
- Crosseola bellula (A. Adams, 1865)
- Crosseola benedotata Rubio & Rolán, 2019
- Crosseola bollonsi Dell, 1956
- Crosseola brasiliensis Rubio & Rolán, 2017
- Crosseola cancellata (Tenison Woods, 1878)
- Crosseola caribbeae Rubio & Rolán, 2017
- Crosseola catenata Rubio & Rolán, 2019
- Crosseola concinna (Angas, 1868)
- Crosseola cuvieriana (Mestayer, 1919)
- Crosseola delicata Rubio & Rolán, 2019
- Crosseola dentata Rubio & Rolán, 2019
- Crosseola distorta Rubio & Rolán, 2019
- † Crosseola emilyae Laws, 1950
- Crosseola enganoensis Poppe & Tagaro, 2026
- Crosseola errata Finlay, 1927
- Crosseola escondida (Poppe, Tagaro & Goto, 2018)
- Crosseola favosa Powell, 1937)
- Crosseola foveolata (Barnard, 1963)
- Crosseola gorii Rubio & Rolán, 2014
- † Crosseola henryi Laws, 1950
- Crosseola indigaxial Rubio, Rolán & Gori, 2019
- Crosseola intercalaris Rubio & Rolán, 2019
- Crosseola intertexta Powell, 1937)
- Crosseola inverta (Hedley, 1907)
- Crosseola latumlabrum Rubio & Rolán, 2019
- Crosseola madagascariensis Rubio & Rolán, 2017
- Crosseola mayottensis Rubio & Rolán, 2019
- Crosseola microstriata Rubio & Rolán, 2019
- Crosseola minireticula Rubio & Rolán, 2019
- † Crosseola munditia Laws, 1936
- Crosseola occlusa Rubio & Rolán, 2019
- Crosseola ordinata Rubio & Rolán, 2017
- Crosseola osgrandis Rubio & Rolán, 2019
- † Crosseola princeps (Tate, 1890)
- † Crosseola proerrata Finlay, 1930
- Crosseola prosoclina Rubio & Rolán, 2019
- Crosseola pseudocollonia Powell, 1957
- † Crosseola semiornata Tate 1893
- Crosseola serrata Rubio, Rolán & Gori, 2019
- Crosseola sexlata Rubio & Rolán, 2019
- Crosseola similiter Rubio & Rolán, 2017
- † Crosseola sinemacula Laws, 1939
- Crosseola solomonensis Rubio & Rolán, 2017
- Crosseola striata (Watson, 1883)
- † Crosseola sultan Finlay, 1930
- Crosseola solomonensis Rubio & Rolán, 2017
- † Crosseola tenuisculpta Laws, 1936
- Crosseola uniformis Rubio, Rolán & Gori, 2019
- † Crosseola waitotara Laws, 1940

Species brought into synonymy

- Crosseola cookiana Dell, 1952: synonym of Lodderia eumorpha cookiana (Dell, 1952) (original combination)
- Crosseola marquesensis Rubio, Rolán & Letourneux, 2017: synonym of Crossolida marquesensis (Rubio, Rolán & Letourneux, 2017) (original combination)
- Crosseola naticoides Iredale, T. & McMichael, D.F. 1962: synonym of Cirsonella naticoides (Hedley, 1907)
- Crosseola vesca (Finlay, 1927): synonym of Dolicrossea vesca Finlay, 1926
