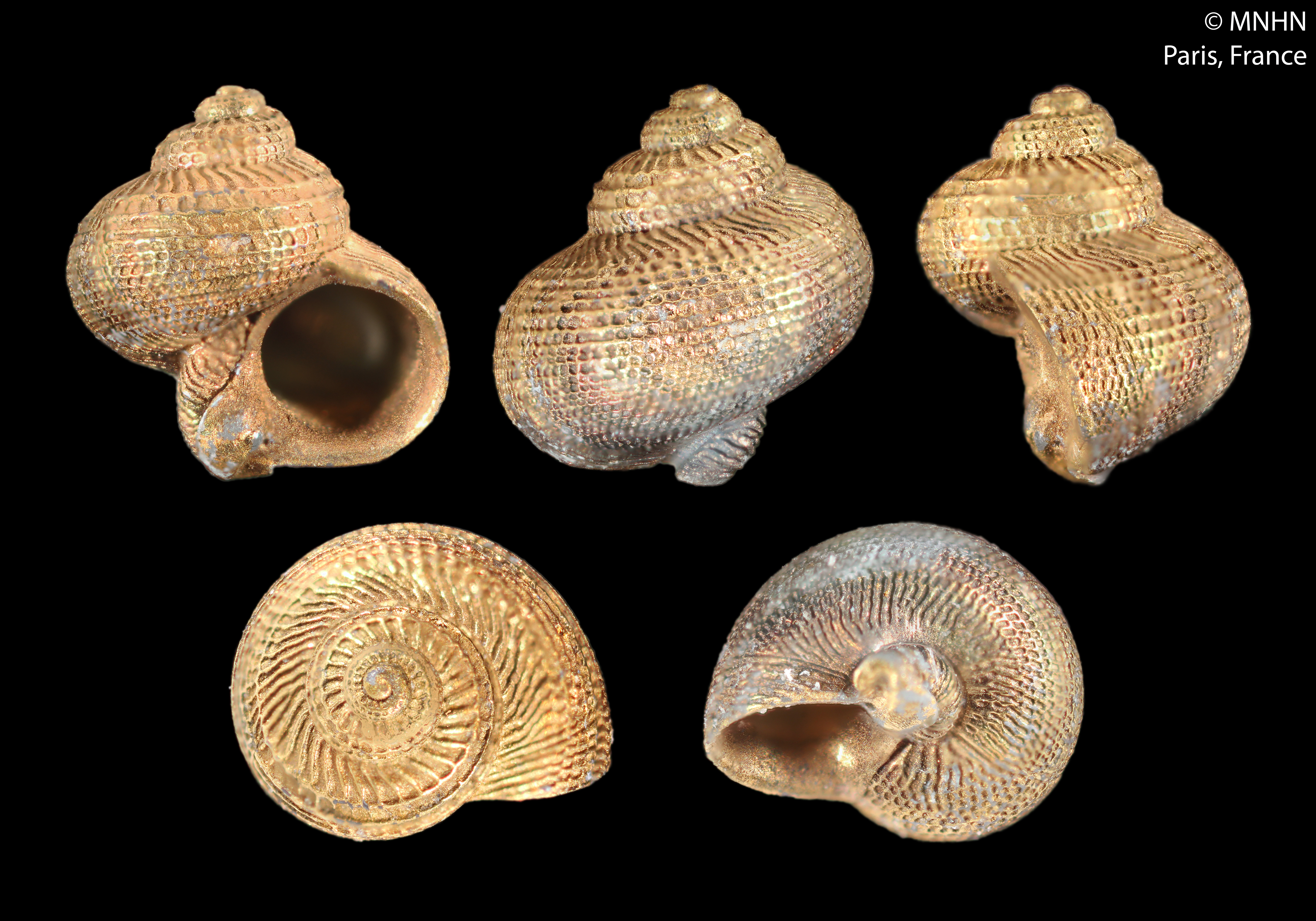
- Shell of Crosseola bellula (syntype at MNHN, Paris)

Scientific classification
- Kingdom: Animalia
- Phylum: Mollusca
- Class: Gastropoda
- Subclass: Vetigastropoda
- Order: Trochida
- Superfamily: Trochoidea
- Family: Conradiidae
- Genus: Crosseola
- Species: C. bellula

Binomial name
- Crosseola bellula (A. Adams, 1865)

Synonyms
- Crossea bellula A. Adams, 1865 (original combination); Dolicrossea bellula (A. Adams, 1865)

= Crosseola bellula =

Species of small sea snail

Crosseola bellula is a species of small sea snail or micromollusc, a marine gastropod mollusc in the family Conradiidae.

== Description ==
The height of the shell attains 2 mm. The white shell has a depressed turbinate shape. The whorls contain spiral lirae and lack varices. The interstices are neatly cancellated. The simple outer lip is thin and has an acute margin.

== Distribution ==
This marine species occurs off the Philippines and Japan.

== Sources ==
- Higo, S., Callomon, P. & Goto, Y. (1999) Catalogue and Bibliography of the Marine Shell-Bearing Mollusca of Japan. Elle Scientific Publications, Yao, Japan, 749 pp
- Rubio F. & Rolán E. (2017). New species of Crosseolidae Hickman, 2013 (Gastropoda) from the Tropical Indo-Pacific. Novapex. 18(1-2): 17-34
- Rubio F. & Rolán E. (2019). New species of Conradiidae Golikov & Starobogatov, 1987 (= Crosseolidae Hickman, 2013) (Gastropoda: Trochoidea) from the Tropical Indo-Pacific II. The genus Crosseola and the description of Crossolida n. gen. Novapex. 20(3): 49–91.
