= Acremodontina atypica =

Scientific classification
- Kingdom: Animalia
- Phylum: Mollusca
- Class: Gastropoda
- Subclass: Vetigastropoda
- Superfamily: Seguenzioidea
- Family: Trochaclididae
- Genus: Acremodontina
- Species: A. atypica

Binomial name
- Acremodontina atypica (Powell, 1937)

Synonyms
- Conjectura atypica Powell, 1937

Species of gastropod

Acremodontina atypica is a species of sea snail, a marine gastropod mollusk in the family Trochaclididae, the false top snails.

== Distribution ==
This species is endemic to the Three Kings Islands, New Zealand, at a depth of 260 m.
