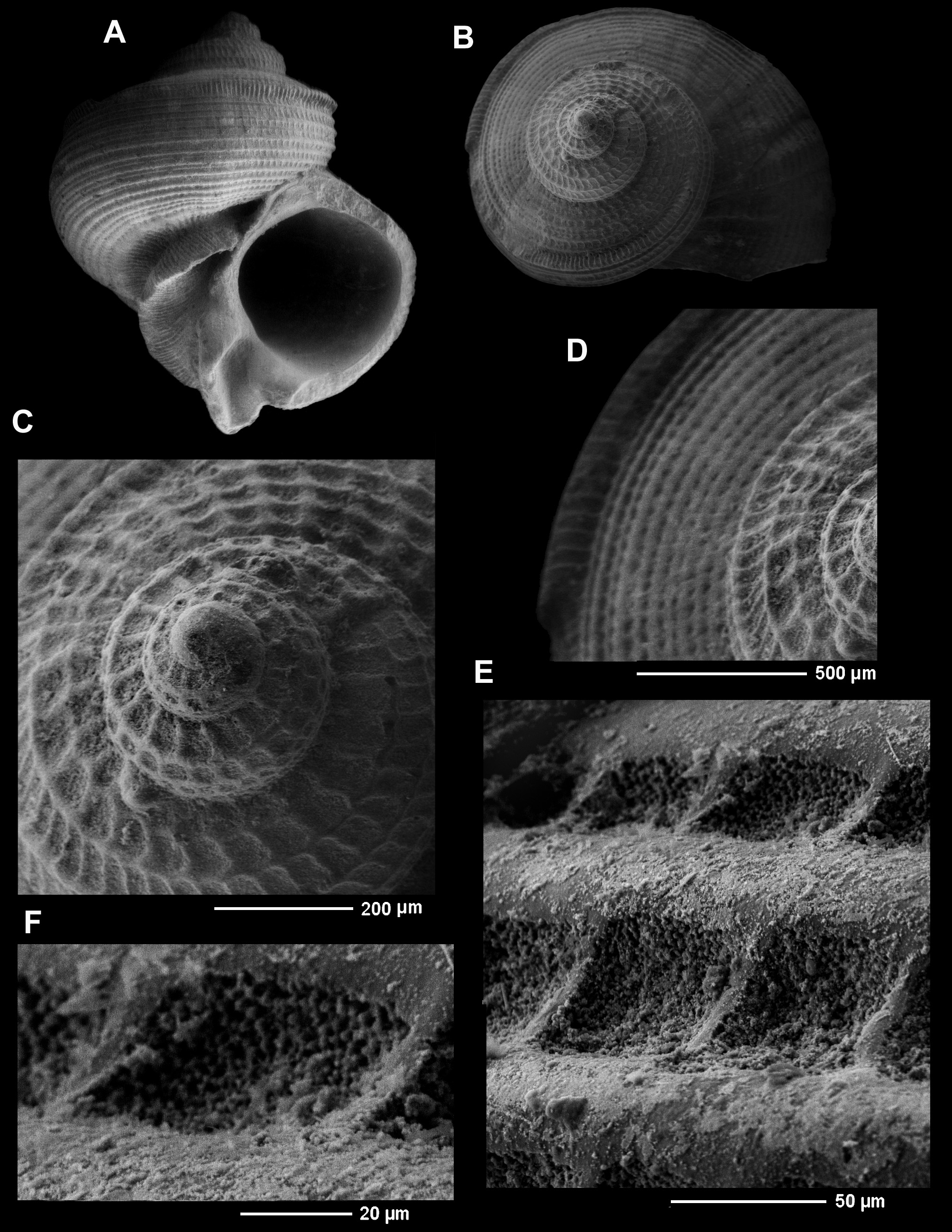
- Shell of Crosseola inverta (specimen at MNHN, Paris)

Scientific classification
- Kingdom: Animalia
- Phylum: Mollusca
- Class: Gastropoda
- Subclass: Vetigastropoda
- Order: Trochida
- Superfamily: Trochoidea
- Family: Conradiidae
- Genus: Crosseola
- Species: C. inverta

Binomial name
- Crosseola inverta (Hedley, 1907)

Synonyms
- Crossea inverta Hedley, 1907 (original combination)

= Crosseola inverta =

Species of gastropod

Crosseola inverta is a species of small sea snail or micromollusc, a marine gastropod mollusc in the family Conradiidae.

== Description ==
(Original description by Charles Hedley) The height of the shell measures 2.45 mm, its diameter 2.65 mm. The very solid, milk-white shell has a biconical shape. The base of the shell is produced, much exceeding the spire, which is low and gradated. The shell contains four whorls, the first minute, unsculptured, the others rapidly increasing in size, parted by channelled sutures.

Sculpture : the upper whorls carry three thick, elevated, spiral ribs, divided by broad, deep grooves. These vanish on the body whorl, which is entirely covered by dense, microscopic spirals so crossed by radials as to give the effect of fine punctures over the whole surface. The basal funicle is massive, coiled on the body whorl like a subsidiary whorl, far extended anteriorly, its truncate extremity excavate. A small perforation occurs below the subcircular aperture in the base of the funicle. The simple outer lip simple is inner reflected over the umbilicus. The umbilicus has superiorly a narrow spiral perforation, inferiorly a trough hollowed between the columella and the funicle.

== Distribution ==
This marine species is endemic to Australia. It occurs off Queensland.

== Bibliography ==
- Cotton, B.C. 1959. South Australian Mollusca. Archaeogastropoda. Handbook of the Flora and Fauna of South Australia. Adelaide : South Australian Government Printer 449 pp.
- Rubio F. & Rolán E. (2019). New species of Conradiidae Golikov & Starobogatov, 1987 (= Crosseolidae Hickman, 2013) (Gastropoda: Trochoidea) from the Tropical Indo-Pacific II. The genus Crosseola and the description of Crossolida n. gen. Novapex. 20(3): 49-91
