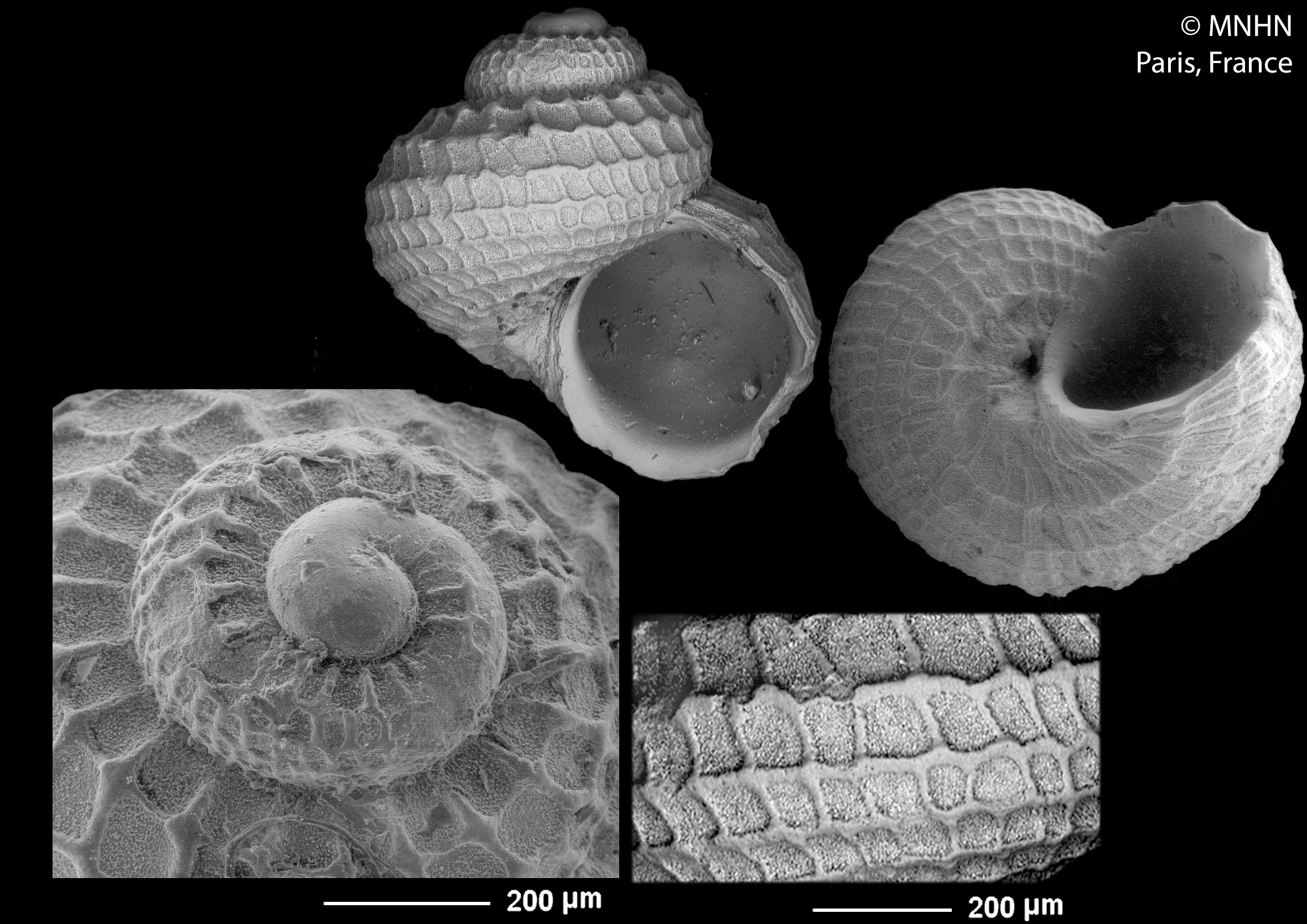
- Shell of Conradia discreta (holotype at MNHN, Paris)

Scientific classification
- Kingdom: Animalia
- Phylum: Mollusca
- Class: Gastropoda
- Subclass: Vetigastropoda
- Order: Trochida
- Superfamily: Trochoidea
- Family: Conradiidae
- Genus: Conradia; A. Adams, 1860

Type species
- Conradia cingulifera A. Adams, 1860

Synonyms
- Conradia (Gottoina) A. Adams, 1863 (original rank as subgenus); Fossarus (Gottoina) A. Adams, 1863; Gottoina A. Adams, 1863; Gottonia (misspelling)

= Conradia =

Genus of gastropods

Conradia is a genus of very small sea snails or micromolluscs, marine gastropod molluscs in the family Conradiidae.

== Species ==
Species within the genus Conradia include:

- Conradia abyssa Rubio & Rolán, 2017
- Conradia carinata Rubio & Rolán, 2020
- Conradia carinifera A. Adams, 1860
- Conradia cingulifera A. Adams, 1860
- Conradia clathrata A. Adams, 1860
- Conradia costriata Rubio & Rolán, 2020
- Conradia delicata Rubio & Rolán, 2020
- Conradia densa Rubio & Rolán, 2020
- Conradia depressa Rubio & Rolán, 2020
- Conradia discreta Rubio & Rolán, 2017
- Conradia dispersa Rubio & Rolán, 2020
- Conradia doliaris A. Adams, 1863
- Conradia edita Rubio & Rolán, 2020
- Conradia eutornisca (Melvill, 1918) (synonym: Fossarus eutorniscus Melvill, 1918)
- Conradia faceta Rubio & Rolán, 2020
- Conradia microsculpta Rubio & Rolán, 2020
- Conradia minicostae Rubio & Rolán, 2020
- Conradia minor Rubio & Rolán, 2017
- Conradia multicostae Rubio & Rolán, 2020
- Conradia museorum Rubio & Rolán, 2020
- Conradia paucicordata Rubio & Rolán, 2020
- Conradia perclathrata Sakurai, 1983
- Conradia perplexa Rubio & Rolán, 2020
- Conradia pluriapices Rubio & Rolán, 2020
- Conradia pulchella A. Adams, 1861
- Conradia pyrgula A. Adams, 1863
- Conradia rheae Poppe & Tagaro, 2026
- Conradia sculpta Rubio & Rolán, 2020
- Conradia similiter Rubio & Rolán, 2020
- Conradia sulcifera A. Adams, 1863
- Conradia sursumnodosa Rubio & Rolán, 2020
- Conradia tornata A. Adams, 1863
- Conradia varia Rubio & Rolán, 2020

Species brought into synonymy

- Conradia minuta Golikov & Starobogatov, 1976: synonym of Fusitriton oregonensis (Redfield, 1846)
