= Acremodontina carinata =

Scientific classification
- Kingdom: Animalia
- Phylum: Mollusca
- Class: Gastropoda
- Subclass: Vetigastropoda
- Superfamily: Seguenzioidea
- Family: Trochaclididae
- Genus: Acremodontina
- Species: A. carinata

Binomial name
- Acremodontina carinata (Powell, 1940)

Synonyms
- Conjectura carinata Powell, 1940

Species of gastropod

Acremodontina carinata is a species of sea snail, a marine gastropod mollusk in the family Trochaclididae, the false top snails.

== Description ==
The shell attains a length of 2.17 mm, its diameter is 1.98 mm.

== Distribution ==
This marine species is endemic to New Zealand and occurs off Three Kings Islands and north-eastern North Island.
