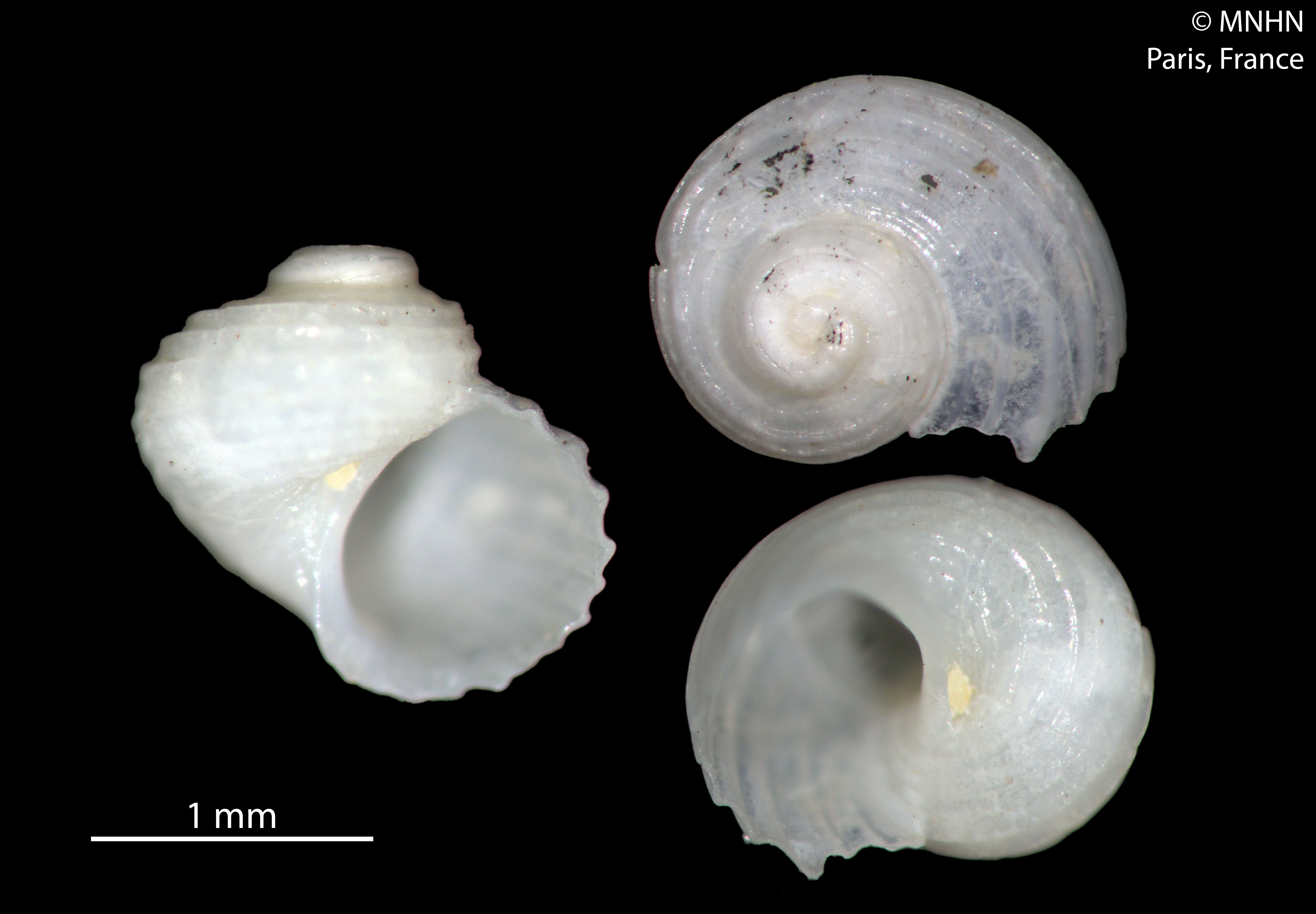
- Acremodontina varicosa

Scientific classification
- Kingdom: Animalia
- Phylum: Mollusca
- Class: Gastropoda
- Subclass: Vetigastropoda
- Superfamily: Seguenzioidea
- Family: Trochaclididae; Thiele, 1928

Synonyms
- Acremodontinae B. A. Marshall, 1983; Trochaclidinae

= Trochaclididae =

Family of gastropods

Trochaclididae, common name the false top snails, is a family of sea snails, marine gastropod mollusks in the clade Vetigastropoda (according to the taxonomy of the Gastropoda by Bouchet & Rocroi, 2005).

This family has no subfamilies. The subfamily Acremodontinae is a synonym of Ataphridae.

== Genera ==
- Acremodonta B. A. Marshall, 1983
- Acremodontina B. A. Marshall, 1995
- † Ataphrus Gabb, 1869 (belongs to the family Ataphridae Cossmann, 1915 † (nomen dubium) )
- Austrotrochaclis B. A. Marshall, 1995
- † Levella Marwick, 1943
- Trochaclis Thiele, 1912
