= Conradiidae =

Scientific classification
- Kingdom: Animalia
- Phylum: Mollusca
- Class: Gastropoda
- Subclass: Vetigastropoda
- Order: Trochida
- Superfamily: Trochoidea
- Family: Conradiidae; Golikov & Starobogatov, 1987

Genera
- See text

Synonyms
- Conradiinae Golikov & Starobogatov, 1987 (original rank); Crosseolidae Hickman, 2013

Family of gastropods

Conradiidae is a taxonomic family (created in 1987 by Golikov & Starobogatov) of very small sea snails, marine gastropod molluscs or micromolluscs. These genera were previously included in the polyphyletic family Skeneidae. They belong within the clade Vetigastropoda, and the superfamily Trochoidea.

== Genera ==
- Conjectura Finlay, 1926
- Conradia A. Adams, 1860
- Crossea A. Adams, 1865
- Crosseola Iredale, 1924
- Crossolida Rubio & Rolán, 2019
