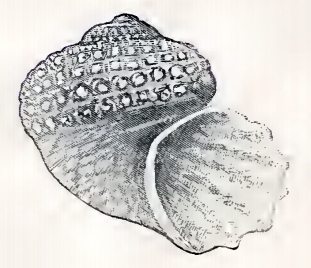
- Apertural view of a shell of Parviturbo fenestratus

Scientific classification
- Kingdom: Animalia
- Phylum: Mollusca
- Class: Gastropoda
- Subclass: Vetigastropoda
- Order: Trochida
- Superfamily: Trochoidea
- Family: Skeneidae
- Genus: Parviturbo; Pilsbry & McGinty, 1945

Type species
- Parviturbo rehderi Pilsbry & McGinty, 1945

= Parviturbo =

Genus of gastropods

Parviturbo is a genus of minute sea snails, marine gastropod mollusks in the family Skeneidae.

== Description ==
The very small, solid shell is perforate or has a narrow umbilicus. It contains a few convex whorls. The protoconch consists of one or two smooth whorls. The turbinate or globoso-conic shell shows numerous subequal spiral cords with in their intervals well developed or weak cross threads. The dentition of the radula is rhipidoglossate.

== Species ==
Species within the genus Parviturbo include:

- Parviturbo acuticostatus (Carpenter, 1864)
- Parviturbo agulhasensis (Thiele, 1925)
- Parviturbo alboranensis Peñas & Rolán, 2006
- Parviturbo alfredensis (Bartsch, 1915)
- Parviturbo annejoffeae Rubio, Rolán & Lee, 2015
- Parviturbo azoricus Rubio, Rolán & Segers, 2015
- Parviturbo billfranki Rubio, Rolán & Lee, 2015
- Parviturbo boucheti Rubio, Rolán & Fernández-Garcés, 2015
- Parviturbo brasiliensis Rubio, Rolán & Lee, 2015
- Parviturbo comptus (Woodring, 1928)
- Parviturbo copiosus Pilsbry & Olsson, 1945
- Parviturbo dibellai Buzzurro & Cecalupo, 2007
- Parviturbo dengyanzhangi Rubio, Rolán & Lee, 2015
- Parviturbo dispar Rubio, Rolán & Letourneux, 2015
- † Parviturbo elegantulus (Philippi, 1844)
- Parviturbo ergasticus Rubio, Rolán & Gofas, 2015
- Parviturbo fenestratus (Chaster, 1896)
- Parviturbo fortius Rubio, Rolán & Fernández-Garcés, 2015
- Parviturbo gofasi Rubio, Rolán & Fernández-Garcés, 2015
- Parviturbo granulum (Dall, 1889)
- Parviturbo guadeloupensis Rubio, Rolán & Fernández-Garcés, 2015
- Parviturbo insularis Rolán, 1988
- Parviturbo javiercondei Rubio, Rolán & Fernández-Garcés, 2015
- Parviturbo laevisculptus Renda, Raveggi, Bartolini, Micali & Giacobbe, 2019
- Parviturbo marcosi Rubio, Rolán & Fernández-Garcés, 2015
- † Parviturbo maturensis Jung, 1969
- Parviturbo multispiralis Rubio, Rolán & Fernández-Garcés, 2015
- Parviturbo parvissima (Hedley, 1899)
- Parviturbo pombali Rubio, Rolán & Fernández-Garcés, 2015
- Parviturbo rectangularis Rubio, Rolán & Fernández-Garcés, 2015
- Parviturbo rehderi Pilsbry & McGinty, 1945
- Parviturbo robustior Rubio, Rolán & Lee, 2015
- Parviturbo rolani Engl, 2001
- Parviturbo seamountensis Rubio, Rolán & Gofas, 2015
- Parviturbo sola (Barnard, 1963)
- † Parviturbo sphaeroideus (S. V. Wood, 1842)
- Parviturbo stearnsii (Dall, 1918)
- Parviturbo tuberculosus (d'Orbigny, 1842)
- Parviturbo vanuatuensis Rubio, Rolán & Fernández-Garcés, 2015
- † Parviturbo venezuelensis Weisbord, 1962
- Parviturbo weberi Pilsbry & McGinty, 1945
- Parviturbo zylmanae Rubio, Rolán & Lee, 2015

Species brought into synonymy

- Parviturbo bellus Dall, 1889: synonym of Fossarus bellus Dall, 1889
- Parviturbo calidimaris Pilsbry & McGinty, 1945: synonym of Haplocochlias calidimaris (Pilsbry & McGinty, 1945)
- Parviturbo concepcionensis (Lowe, 1935): synonym of Haplocochlias concepcionensis (Lowe, 1933)
- Parviturbo copiosus Pilsbry & Olsson, 1945: synonym of Parviturboides copiosus (Pilsbry & Olsson, 1945) (original combination)
- Parviturbo decussatus (Carpenter, 1857): synonym of Parviturboides decussatus (Carpenter, 1857)
- Parviturbo dibellai Buzzurro & Cecalupo, 2007: synonym of Fossarus eutorniscus Melvill, 1918: synonym of Conradia eutornisca (Melvill, 1918)
- Parviturbo erici (Strong & Hertlein, 1939): synonym of Haplocochlias erici (Strong & Hertlein, 1939)
- Parviturbo francesae Pilsbry & McGinty, 1945: synonym of Haplocochlias francesae (Pilsbry & McGinty, 1945)
- Parviturbo germanus Pilsbry & Olsson, 1945: synonym of Parviturboides germanus (Pilsbry & Olsson, 1945) (original combination)
- † Parviturbo lecointreae (Dollfus & Dautzenberg, 1899): synonym of † Pareuchelus lecointreae (Dollfus & Dautzenberg, 1899) (superseded combination)
- Parviturbo parvissimus (Hedley, 1899): synonym of Lophocochlias parvissimus (Hedley, 1899)
- Parviturbo turbinus (Dall, 1889): synonym of Haplocochlias turbinus (Dall, 1889)
- Parviturbo zacalles Mazyck, 1913: synonym of Parviturboides interruptus (C. B. Adams, 1850)
