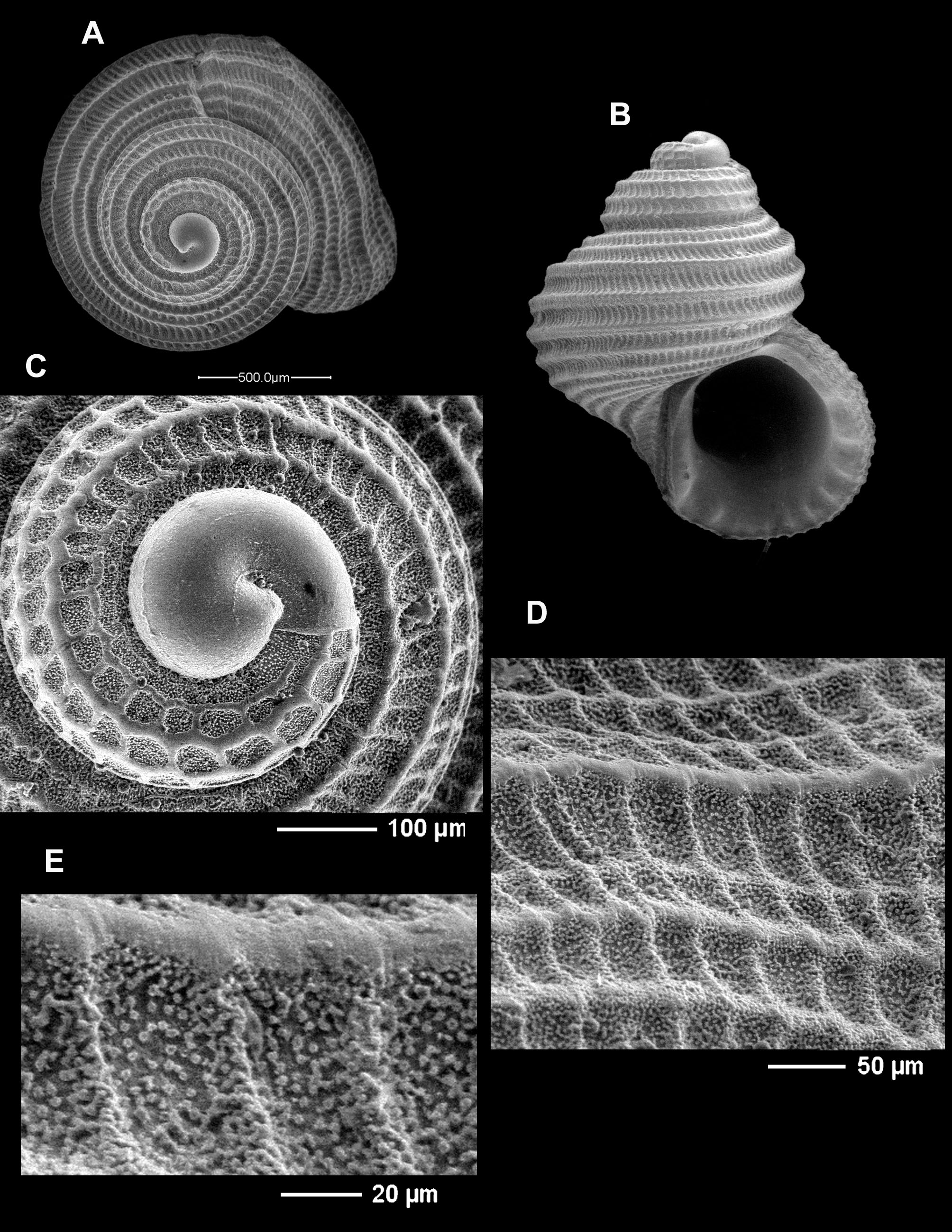
- Shell of Haplocochlias arawakorum (specimen at MNHN, Paris)

Scientific classification
- Kingdom: Animalia
- Phylum: Mollusca
- Class: Gastropoda
- Subclass: Vetigastropoda
- Order: Trochida
- Family: Skeneidae
- Genus: Haplocochlias; Carpenter, 1864

Type species
- Haplocochlias cyclophoreus Carpenter, 1864

= Haplocochlias =

Genus of gastropods

Haplocochlias is a genus of sea snails, marine gastropod mollusks in the family Skeneidae.

== Description ==
The solid, subperforate shell has a turbinate shape. The aperture is rounded. The thick peristome is continuous and exteriorly varicose. The columella is not callous.

The shell is small to minute (1–6 mm in height), turbiniform, with a closed to narrowly open umbilicus lined internally with spiral cordlets. The protoconch comprises about three-quarters of a whorl and is either smooth or bears fine spiral cordlets. The teleoconch has a rounded to slightly angular periphery, ornamented with numerous spiral cords and fine axial striae, with minute tubercles present in the interspaces. The aperture is prosocline, with a continuous peristome. The columella is sometimes reflected toward the umbilicus, broadening at its base, and in some species displaying a depressed area where it meets the umbilical cord. The outer lip may be either broad or delicate, and is crenulated or anteriorly expanded.

== Species ==
Species within the genus Haplocochlias include:

- Haplocochlias arawakorum Rubio & Rolán, 2015
- Haplocochlias arrondoi Rubio, Fernández-Garcés & Rolán, 2013
- Haplocochlias bellus (Dall, 1889)
- Haplocochlias bieleri Rubio, Fernández-Garcés & Rolán, 2013
- Haplocochlias calidimaris (Pilsbry & McGinty, 1945)
- Haplocochlias christopheri Rubio & Rolán, 2015
- Haplocochlias compactus (Dall, 1889)
- Haplocochlias concepcionensis (Lowe, 1933)
- Haplocochlias cubensis Espinosa, Ortea, Fernandez-Garcés & Moro, 2007
- Haplocochlias cyclophoreus Carpenter, 1864
- Haplocochlias densistriatus Rubio, Rolán & H. G. Lee, 2013
- Haplocochlias erici (Strong & Hertlein, 1939)
- Haplocochlias francesae (Pilsbry & McGinty, 1945)
- Haplocochlias garciai Rubio, Fernández-Garcés & Rolán, 2013
- Haplocochlias harryleei Rubio, Fernández-Garcés & Rolán, 2013
- Haplocochlias karukera Rubio & Rolán, 2015
- Haplocochlias loperi Rubio, Rolán & Lee in Rubio, Fernández-Garcés & Rolán, 2013
- Haplocochlias lucasensis (Strong, 1934)
- Haplocochlias lupita Espinosa & Ortea, 2013
- Haplocochlias minusdentatus Rubio, Rolán & Redfern in Rubio, Fernández-Garcés & Rolán, 2013
- Haplocochlias moolenbeeki De Jong & Coomans, 1988
- Haplocochlias multiliratus Rubio, Fernández-Garcés & Rolán, 2013
- Haplocochlias nunezi Espinosa, Ortea & Fernandez-Garces, 2004
- Haplocochlias onaneyi Espinosa, Ortea & Fernandez-Garces, 2004
- Haplocochlias ortizi Espinosa, Ortea & Fernandez-Garces, 2005
- Haplocochlias pacorubioi Rubio, Fernández-Garcés & Rolán, 2013
- Haplocochlias panamensis Rubio, Fernández-Garcés & Rolán, 2013
- Haplocochlias pauciliratus Rubio, Rolán & Lee in Rubio, Fernández-Garcés & Rolán, 2013
- Haplocochlias pitico Cavallari, 2026
- Haplocochlias risoneideneryae De Barros, dos Santos F.N., Santos, Cabral & Acioli, 2002
- Haplocochlias swifti Vanatta, 1913
- Haplocochlias turbinus (Dall, 1889)
- Haplocochlias williami de Barros et al., 2002

Species brought in to synonymy

- Haplocochlias minutissimus Pilsbry, 1921: synonym of Lophocochlias minutissimus (Pilsbry, 1921)
- Haplocochlias onaneyi Espinosa, Ortea & Fernández-Garcés, 2005: synonym of Haplocochlias williami Barros, Santos, Santos, Cabral & Acioli, 2002
- Haplocochlias risonideneryae[sic]: synonym of Haplocochlias risoneideneryae Barros, Santos, Santos, Cabral & Acioli, 2002
- Haplocochlias swifti auct. non Vanatta, 1913: synonym of Haplocochlias nunezi Espinosa, Ortea & Fernández-Garcés, 2005
