= Haplocochlias onaneyi =

Scientific classification
- Kingdom: Animalia
- Phylum: Mollusca
- Class: Gastropoda
- Subclass: Vetigastropoda
- Order: Trochida
- Family: Skeneidae
- Genus: Haplocochlias
- Species: H. onaneyi

Binomial name
- Haplocochlias onaneyi Espinosa, Ortea & Fernandez-Garces, 2004

Species of gastropod

Haplocochlias onaneyi is a species of sea snail, a marine gastropod mollusk in the family Skeneidae.

The Database of Western Atlantic Marine Mollusca considers this species a synonym of Haplocochlias williami.

== Distribution ==
This species occurs in the Gulf of Mexico and in the Caribbean Sea.
