= Parviturboides =

Scientific classification
- Kingdom: Animalia
- Phylum: Mollusca
- Class: Gastropoda
- Subclass: Caenogastropoda
- Order: Littorinimorpha
- Family: Tornidae
- Genus: Parviturboides; Pilsbry & McGinty, 1949

Genus of gastropods

Parviturboides is a genus of gastropods belonging to the family Tornidae.

The species of this genus are found in America.

Species:

- Parviturboides avitus Pilsbry, 1953 (taxon ijquirendum)
- Parviturboides clausus (Pilsbry & Olsson, 1945)
- Parviturboides copiosus (Pilsbry & Olsson, 1945)
- Parviturboides decussatus (Carpenter, 1857)
- Parviturboides germanus (Pilsbry & Olsson, 1945)
- Parviturboides habrotima Kilburn, 1977
- Parviturboides interruptus (C.B.Adams, 1850)
- Parviturboides monile (Carpenter, 1857)
- Parviturboides monilifera (Carpenter, 1857)

Synonyms

- Parviturboides parvissimus (Hedley, 1899): synonym of Lophocochlias parvissimus (Hedley, 1899) (superseded combination)
