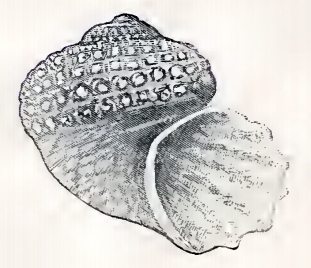
- Original drawing of a shell of Parviturbo fenestratus

Scientific classification
- Kingdom: Animalia
- Phylum: Mollusca
- Class: Gastropoda
- Subclass: Vetigastropoda
- Order: Trochida
- Family: Skeneidae
- Genus: Parviturbo
- Species: P. fenestratus

Binomial name
- Parviturbo fenestratus (Chaster, 1896)

Synonyms
- Cyclostrema fenestratum Chaster, 1896 (original combination)

= Parviturbo fenestratus =

Species of gastropod

Parviturbo fenestratus is a species of a rare, small sea snail, a marine gastropod mollusk in the family Skeneidae.

== Description ==
The size of the shell varies between 1 mm and 2 mm.

== Distribution ==
This species occurs in the Central Mediterranean Sea; in the Atlantic Ocean off the Canary Islands and of Tanger, Morocco.
