= Haplocochlias lucasensis =

Scientific classification
- Kingdom: Animalia
- Phylum: Mollusca
- Class: Gastropoda
- Subclass: Vetigastropoda
- Order: Trochida
- Family: Skeneidae
- Genus: Haplocochlias
- Species: H. lucasensis

Binomial name
- Haplocochlias lucasensis (Strong, 1934)

Synonyms
- Arene lucasensis (Strong, 1934); Liotia lucasensis Strong, 1934 (original combination)

Species of gastropod

Haplocochlias lucasensis is a species of sea snail, a marine gastropod mollusk in the family Skeneidae.

== Description ==
The height of the shell attains 1.7 mm and its diameter 1.6 mm.

== Distribution ==
This marine species occurs off Baja California.
