= Parviturbo acuticostatus =

Scientific classification
- Kingdom: Animalia
- Phylum: Mollusca
- Class: Gastropoda
- Subclass: Vetigastropoda
- Order: Trochida
- Family: Skeneidae
- Genus: Parviturbo
- Species: P. acuticostatus

Binomial name
- Parviturbo acuticostatus (Carpenter, 1864)

Species of gastropod

Parviturbo acuticostatus is a species of small sea snail, a marine gastropod mollusk in the family Skeneidae.

== Description ==
The maximum diameter of the shell can reach 3 mm.

== Distribution ==
This species occurs in the Pacific Ocean off California.
