= Parviturbo tuberculosus =

Scientific classification
- Kingdom: Animalia
- Phylum: Mollusca
- Class: Gastropoda
- Subclass: Vetigastropoda
- Order: Trochida
- Family: Skeneidae
- Genus: Parviturbo
- Species: P. tuberculosus

Binomial name
- Parviturbo tuberculosus (d'Orbigny, 1842)

Synonyms
- Trochus (Delphinula) tuberculosa d'Orbigny, 1842; Parviturbo venezuelensis Weisbord, 1962

Species of mollusc

Parviturbo tuberculosus is a species of small sea snail, a marine gastropod mollusk in the family Skeneidae.

== Description ==
The size of the shell attains 2.5 mm. From the original description and the lectotype : shell small, robust, as high as wide (H/d= 0.96), white, turbiniform, formed by 3 ¾ whorls, narrowly umbilicate. Protoconch of ¾ whorls, apex sharp. Teleoconch of 3 whorls, the last one very wide, separated by a impressed suture; periphery rounded. ornamentation formed by spiral cords and axial ribs.The cords are as wide as their interspaces; in apertural view, 3 cords can be seen on the first whorl and 8 on the last one between the suture and the umbilicus. The 2 subsutural cords and the 2 basal ones are nodulose; on the last quarter of whorl, strong nodules appear on all the cords until the edge of the outer lip. axial ribs finer than the spiral cords, wider and more separate in the last quarter of whorl. umbilicus narrow, deep, delimited by a thick cord, inside with only marked growth lines. aperture rounded, prosocline; parietal callus thick, continued into the columella which is very thick, not curved nor reflected. outer lip strong, with a bevelled edge, scalloped by the termination of the spiral cords. The lectotype designed from Jamaica is 2.45 mm in diameter and 2.35 mm in height. Maximum Reported size: 2.5 mm Habitat: infralittoral species reported as very abundant in shallow water. ARANGO (1878) indicates that it is an abundant species in the sands of the el chivo beach, Havana, cuba, but the absence of the species in recent collecting may indicate that the species was confused with another one.

Depth: 6 m.

Distribution: Probably endemic of Jamaica.

== Distribution ==
This marine species occurs in the Caribbean Sea, off Jamaica, Venezuela; and the Virgin Islands at a depth of 6 m.
