= Haplocochlias cubensis =

Scientific classification
- Kingdom: Animalia
- Phylum: Mollusca
- Class: Gastropoda
- Subclass: Vetigastropoda
- Order: Trochida
- Family: Skeneidae
- Genus: Haplocochlias
- Species: H. cubensis

Binomial name
- Haplocochlias cubensis Espinosa, Ortea, Fernandez-Garcés & Moro, 2007

Species of gastropod

Haplocochlias cubensis is a species of sea snail, a marine gastropod mollusk in the family Skeneidae.

== Description ==
The height of the shell attains 3 mm.

== Distribution ==
This marine species is found in the Caribbean Sea off Cuba at depths between 30 m and 40 m.
