= Parviturbo alboranensis =

Scientific classification
- Kingdom: Animalia
- Phylum: Mollusca
- Class: Gastropoda
- Subclass: Vetigastropoda
- Order: Trochida
- Family: Skeneidae
- Genus: Parviturbo
- Species: P. alboranensis

Binomial name
- Parviturbo alboranensis Peñas & Rolán, 2006

Species of gastropod

Parviturbo alboranensis is a species of sea snail, a marine gastropod mollusk in the family Skeneidae and genus Parviturbo.

== Description ==
The height of the shell attains 0.9 mm, its diameter 1.2 mm.

== Distribution ==
The species was found off the Isla de Alborán in the western Mediterranean Sea.
