= Parviturbo rehderi =

Scientific classification
- Kingdom: Animalia
- Phylum: Mollusca
- Class: Gastropoda
- Subclass: Vetigastropoda
- Order: Trochida
- Family: Skeneidae
- Genus: Parviturbo
- Species: P. rehderi

Binomial name
- Parviturbo rehderi Pilsbry & McGinty, 1945

Species of gastropod

Parviturbo rehderi is a species of sea snail, a marine gastropod mollusk in the family Skeneidae.

== Description ==
The size of the shell attains 1.7 mm.

== Distribution ==
This species occurs in the Gulf of Mexico, the Caribbean Sea and in the Atlantic Ocean off Brazil, at depths up to 40 m.
