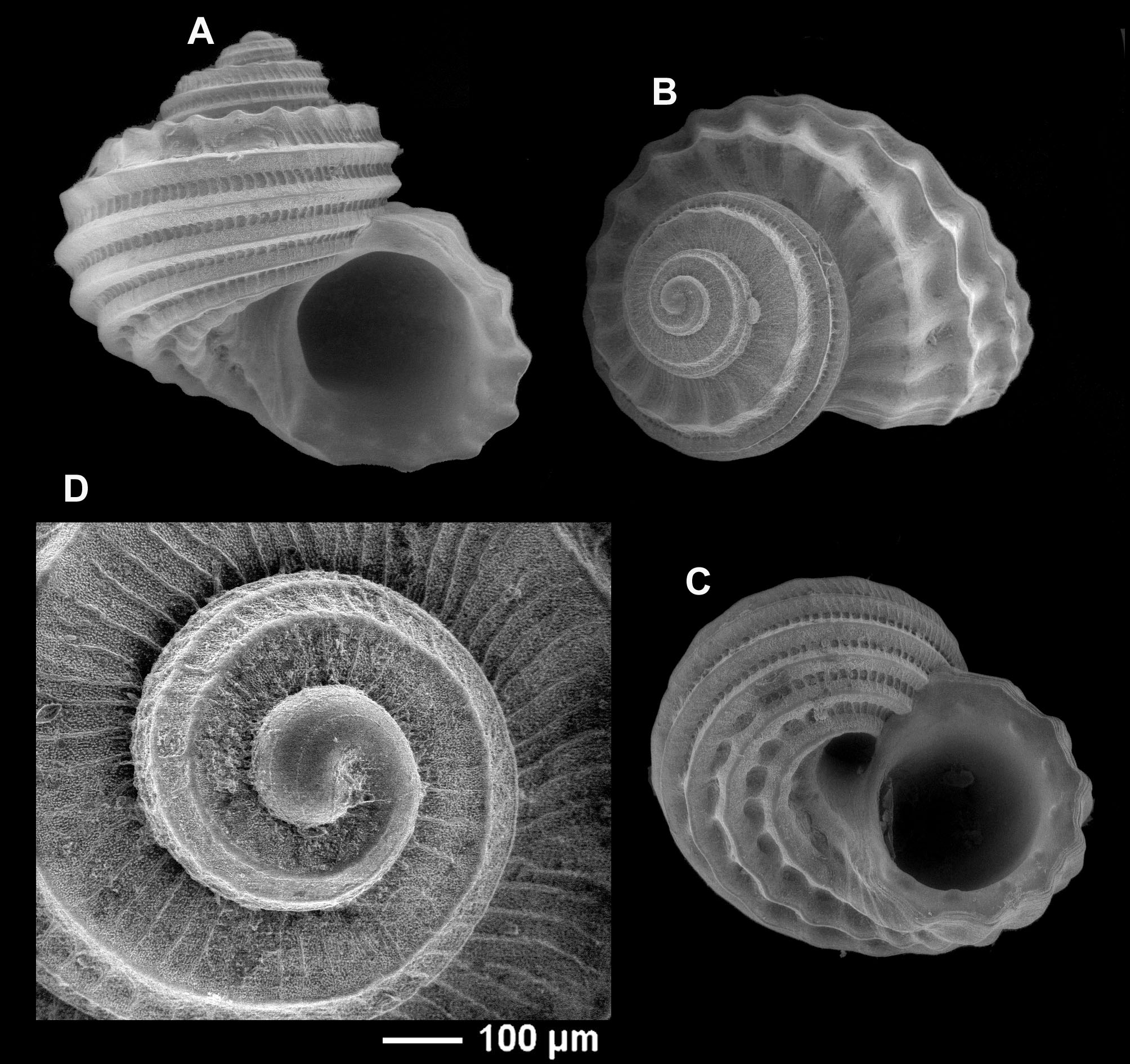
- Shell of Parviturbo weberi (specimen at MNHN, Paris)

Scientific classification
- Kingdom: Animalia
- Phylum: Mollusca
- Class: Gastropoda
- Subclass: Vetigastropoda
- Order: Trochida
- Family: Skeneidae
- Genus: Parviturbo
- Species: P. weberi

Binomial name
- Parviturbo weberi Pilsbry & McGinty, 1945

= Parviturbo weberi =

Species of gastropod

Parviturbo weberi is a species of sea snail, a marine gastropod mollusk in the family Skeneidae.

== Description ==
The size of the shell attains 1.7 mm.

== Distribution ==
This species occurs in the Gulf of Mexico, the Caribbean Sea and the Lesser Antilles; in the Atlantic Ocean off the Bahamas and Brazil at depths up to 60 m.
