= Parviturbo stearnsii =

Scientific classification
- Kingdom: Animalia
- Phylum: Mollusca
- Class: Gastropoda
- Subclass: Vetigastropoda
- Order: Trochida
- Family: Skeneidae
- Genus: Parviturbo
- Species: P. stearnsii

Binomial name
- Parviturbo stearnsii (Dall, 1918)

Synonyms
- Liotia heimi Strong & Hertlein, 1939

Species of gastropod

Parviturbo stearnsii is a species of sea snail, a marine gastropod mollusk in the family Skeneidae.

== Distribution ==
This species occurs in the Pacific Ocean off Baja California.
