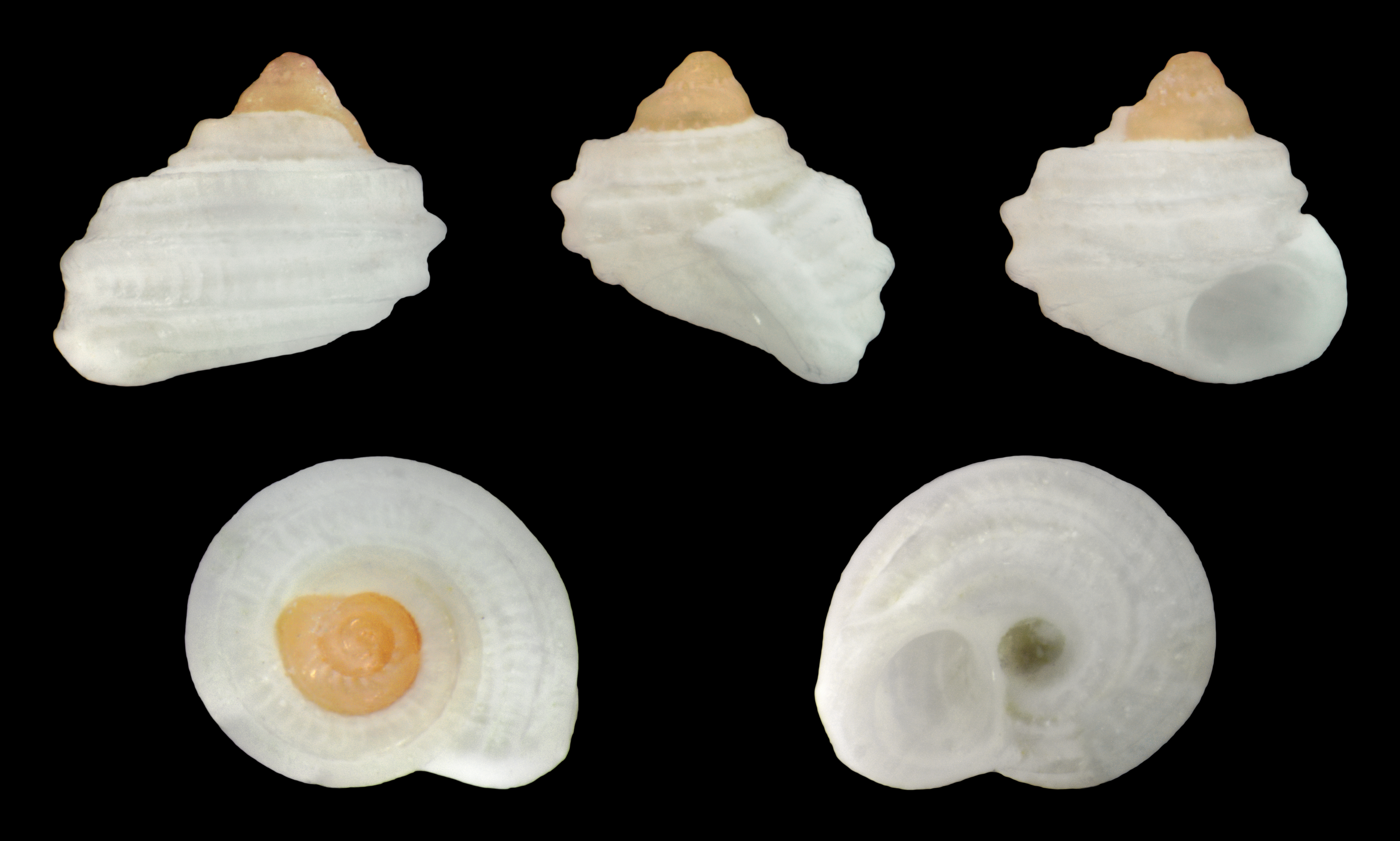
- Lophocochlias parvissimus (Hedley, 1899)

Scientific classification
- Kingdom: Animalia
- Phylum: Mollusca
- Class: Gastropoda
- Subclass: Caenogastropoda
- Order: Littorinimorpha
- Family: Tornidae
- Genus: Lophocochlias; Pilsbry, 1921

Type species
- Haplocochlias (Lophocochlias) minutissimus Pilsbry, 1921

Species
- See text

Synonyms
- Aqabarella Alhejoj, Bandel & Al-Najjar, 2016 (unavailable genus name: based on an unavailable type species name); Haplocochlias (Lophocochlias) Pilsbry, 1921

= Lophocochlias =

Genus of gastropods

Lophocochlias is a genus of minute sea snails or micromolluscs, marine gastropod molluscs in the family Tornidae.

== Species ==
Species within the genus Lophocochlias include:

- † Lophocochlias oblongus Lozouet, 2011
- Lophocochlias parvissimus (Hedley, 1899)
- † Lophocochlias paucicarinatus Ladd, 1966 †
- Lophocochlias procerus Rubio & Rolán, 2015
- † Lophocochlias stampinensis Lozouet, 2011 †

Species brought into synonymy

- Lophocochlias escondidus Poppe, Tagaro & Goto, 2018: synonym of Crosseola escondida (Poppe, Tagaro & Goto, 2018) (original combination)
- Lophocochlias minutissimus (Pilsbry, 1921): synonym of Lophocochlias parvissimus (Hedley, 1899)
