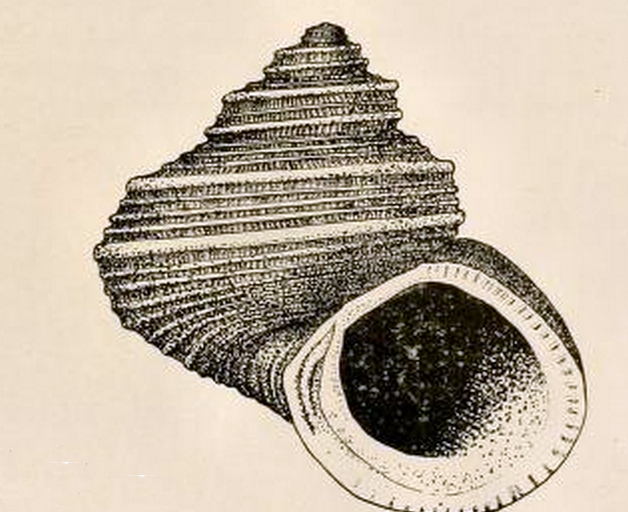
- Original drawing of a shell of Haplocochlias swifti

Scientific classification
- Kingdom: Animalia
- Phylum: Mollusca
- Class: Gastropoda
- Subclass: Vetigastropoda
- Order: Trochida
- Family: Skeneidae
- Genus: Haplocochlias
- Species: H. swifti

Binomial name
- Haplocochlias swifti Vanatta, 1913

= Haplocochlias swifti =

Species of gastropod

Haplocochlias swifti is a species of sea snail, a marine gastropod mollusk in the family Skeneidae.

== Description ==
(Original description by E.G. Vanatta) The height of the shell attains 3.9 mm. The small, umbilicate, white shell has a turbinate shape. Its suture is deeply impressed. The spire is elevated and contains 5 very convex whorls. These are contabulate, the first whorl somewhat eroded, the two following whorls bicarinate, the penultimate and body whorl more or less tricarinate. The body whorl is sculptured with 24 spaced spiral striae with microscopic vertical striae in the interstices. The fourth, sixth and eighth striae below the suture on the body whorl are larger than the others and three or four striae near the umbilicus are closer together. The umbilicus is of moderate size. The aperture is orbicular. The continuous peristome is very thick, and broadly refiexed, crenate. The parietal callus is thick. The columella is narrow above and broad at the base, bearing a median groove.

== Distribution ==
This species occurs in the Caribbean Sea, the Gulf of Mexico and off the Lesser Antilles at depths between 5 m and 45 m.
