= Haplocochlias risoneideneryae =

Scientific classification
- Kingdom: Animalia
- Phylum: Mollusca
- Class: Gastropoda
- Subclass: Vetigastropoda
- Order: Trochida
- Family: Skeneidae
- Genus: Haplocochlias
- Species: H. risoneideneryae

Binomial name
- Haplocochlias risoneideneryae de Barros, dos Santos F.N., Santos, Cabral & Acioli, 2002

Synonyms
- Haplocochlias risonideneryae [sic] (misspelling)

Species of gastropod

Haplocochlias risoneideneryae is a species of sea snail, a marine gastropod mollusk in the family Skeneidae.

== Distribution ==
This species occurs in the Atlantic Ocean off Brazil.
