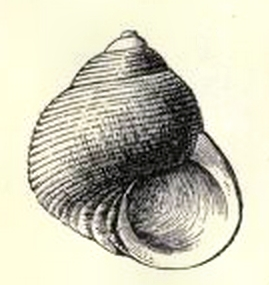
- Drawing with an apertural view of a shell of Haplocochlias compactus

Scientific classification
- Kingdom: Animalia
- Phylum: Mollusca
- Class: Gastropoda
- Subclass: Vetigastropoda
- Order: Trochida
- Family: Skeneidae
- Genus: Haplocochlias
- Species: H. compactus

Binomial name
- Haplocochlias compactus (Dall, 1889)

Synonyms
- Fossarus (Gottoina) compacta Dall, 1889

= Haplocochlias compactus =

Species of gastropod

Haplocochlias compactus is a species of sea snail, a marine gastropod mollusc in the family Skeneidae.

== Description ==
(Original description by W.H. Dall) The height of the shell attains 2.3 mm, its diameter 2 mm. The small, white shell is compact and elevated. It is spirally sculptured with about 4½ whorls, including the nucleus. The outline of the spire is convex with hardly any rounding in of the whorls toward the suture, which is nevertheless distinct and finely channelled. There is no radiating sculpture. The lines of growth are not visible. The spiral sculpture consists of fine, close, even, rounded threads, growing gradually smaller from the suture forward. There is no secondary grooving. There are about 25 threads on the body whorl, but they vary in number and strength with the individual specimen. The imperforate base of the shell is full and rounded. The aperture is rounded, pointed behind, and the angle is filled with callus. This callus is continuous and is the thinnest on the columella.

== Distribution ==
This species occurs in the Gulf of Mexico and in the Caribbean Sea; in the Atlantic Ocean off North Carolina, United States.
