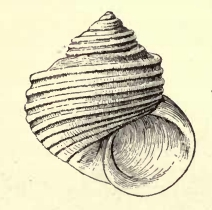
- Drawing with an apertural view of a shell of Haplocochlias bellus

Scientific classification
- Kingdom: Animalia
- Phylum: Mollusca
- Class: Gastropoda
- Subclass: Vetigastropoda
- Order: Trochida
- Family: Skeneidae
- Genus: Haplocochlias
- Species: H. bellus

Binomial name
- Haplocochlias bellus (Dall, 1889)

Synonyms
- Fossarus (Gottoina) bella Dall, 1889

= Haplocochlias bellus =

Species of gastropod

Haplocochlias bellus is a species of sea snail, a marine gastropod mollusc in the family Skeneidae.

== Description ==
(Original description by W.H. Dall) The height of the shell attains 3.5 mm, its diameter also 3.5 mm. The small, white, solid shell is shaped much like Littorina littorea (Linnaeus, 1758), having 4½ whorls and a minute glassy rounded nucleus. The radiating sculpture consists of fine incremental striae and occasional irregularities of growth. The spiral sculpture consists of two sorts. First, the fine spiral grooving covers the whole shell evenly and is always present. Secondly, there are strong spiral ridges, generally nine or ten on the body whorl, but sometimes smaller and more numerous, sometimes partly absent, sometimes so arranged as to tabulate the part of the whorl next the suture, and almost invariably smaller and weaker as they approach the base and the centre of the base. The suture is distinct, not channelled. The simple aperture is nearly circular, but the outer margin of its thickened edge is angulated at the junction with the body. The callus is continuous. The columella is arched, with a small chink, but no umbilicus behind it. This chink varies in size with different specimens. The aperture is oblique, its upper margin a little depressed. This shell sometimes has the raised riblets reddish brown against the waxen white of the rest.

== Distribution ==
This species occurs in the Gulf of Mexico.
