= Haplocochlias panamensis =

Scientific classification
- Kingdom: Animalia
- Phylum: Mollusca
- Class: Gastropoda
- Subclass: Vetigastropoda
- Order: Trochida
- Family: Skeneidae
- Genus: Haplocochlias
- Species: H. panamensis

Binomial name
- Haplocochlias panamensis Rubio, Fernández-Garcés & Rolán, 2013

Species of gastropod

Haplocochlias panamensis is a species of sea snail, a marine gastropod mollusc in the family Skeneidae.
