= Haplocochlias minusdentatus =

Scientific classification
- Kingdom: Animalia
- Phylum: Mollusca
- Class: Gastropoda
- Subclass: Vetigastropoda
- Order: Trochida
- Family: Skeneidae
- Genus: Haplocochlias
- Species: H. minusdentatus

Binomial name
- Haplocochlias minusdentatus Rubio, Rolán & Redfern in Rubio, Fernández-Garcés & Rolán, 2013

Species of gastropod

Haplocochlias minusdentatus is a species of sea snail, a marine gastropod mollusc in the family Skeneidae.
