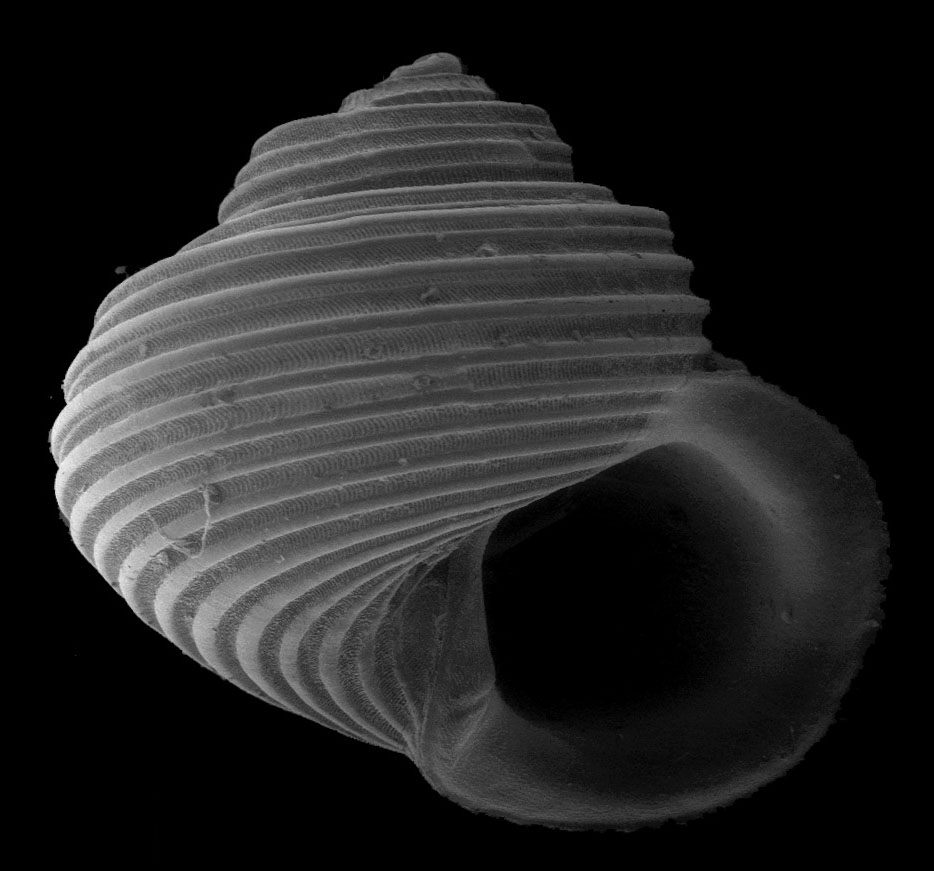
- Shell of Haplocochlias ortizi (specimen at MNHN, Paris)

Scientific classification
- Kingdom: Animalia
- Phylum: Mollusca
- Class: Gastropoda
- Subclass: Vetigastropoda
- Order: Trochida
- Family: Skeneidae
- Genus: Haplocochlias
- Species: H. ortizi

Binomial name
- Haplocochlias ortizi Espinosa, Ortea & Fernandez-Garces, 2004

= Haplocochlias ortizi =

Species of gastropod

Haplocochlias ortizi is a species of sea snail, a marine gastropod mollusk in the family Skeneidae.

== Description ==
The height of the shell attains 3 mm.

== Distribution ==
This species occurs in the Caribbean Sea off Guadeloupe and Cuba at a depth between 49 m and 54 m.
