= Parviturbo elegantulus =

Scientific classification
- Kingdom: Animalia
- Phylum: Mollusca
- Class: Gastropoda
- Subclass: Vetigastropoda
- Order: Trochida
- Family: Skeneidae
- Genus: Parviturbo
- Species: P. elegantulus

Binomial name
- Parviturbo elegantulus (Philippi, 1844)

Synonyms
- Delphinula elegantula Philippi 1844; Trochus (Margarita) benoiti Granata-Grillo 1877

Species of gastropod

Parviturbo elegantulus is a species of sea snail, a marine gastropod mollusk in the family Skeneidae.

== Description ==
The size of the shell attains 1.7 mm. This species occurs in the Alboran Sea at depths between 120 m and 160 m.
