= Haplocochlias moolenbeeki =

Scientific classification
- Kingdom: Animalia
- Phylum: Mollusca
- Class: Gastropoda
- Subclass: Vetigastropoda
- Order: Trochida
- Family: Skeneidae
- Genus: Haplocochlias
- Species: H. moolenbeeki

Binomial name
- Haplocochlias moolenbeeki De Jong & Coomans, 1988

Species of gastropod

Haplocochlias moolenbeeki is a species of sea snail, a marine gastropod mollusk in the family Skeneidae.

== Description ==
The height of the shell attains 4.7 mm.

== Distribution ==
This marine species occurs off Colombia; the ABC Islands: Aruba, Curaçao.
