= Parviturbo insularis =

Scientific classification
- Kingdom: Animalia
- Phylum: Mollusca
- Class: Gastropoda
- Subclass: Vetigastropoda
- Order: Trochida
- Family: Skeneidae
- Genus: Parviturbo
- Species: P. insularis

Binomial name
- Parviturbo insularis Rolán, 1988

Species of gastropod

Parviturbo insularis is a species of sea snail, a marine gastropod mollusk in the family Skeneidae.

== Description ==
It is the first species of the genus Parviturbo to be found in the eastern Atlantic.

In 1945, the genus was created by American malacologists Henry Augustus Pilsbry and Thomas L. McGinty to describe a specific grouping of small gastropods inhabiting the northern hemisphere of the Atlantic Ocean. These mollosks were all found to have a multi-spiral operculum, ciliated cephalic tentacles, rhipidoglostate radula, an elongated foot with two anterior lobes, and three pairs of epipodial tentacles.

The insularis species differs from other members of the genus in that its spiral cords have different widths and it has five lateral teeth on either side, in comparison with Pseudorbis granulum, which only has four.

The size of the shell attains 1.6 mm.

== Distribution ==
This species occurs in the Atlantic Ocean off of Cape Verdes.
