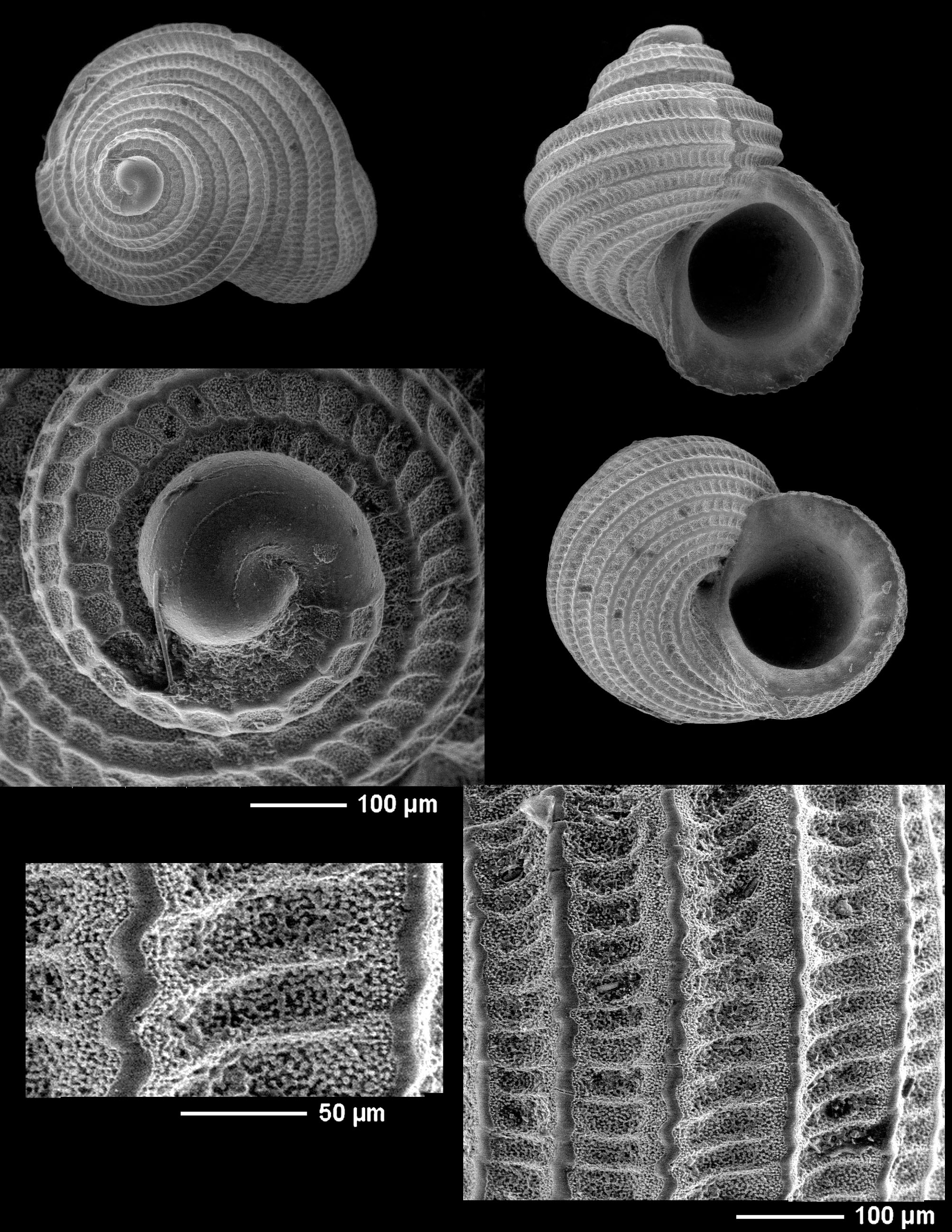
- Shell of Haplocochlias loperi (specimen at MNHN, Paris)

Scientific classification
- Kingdom: Animalia
- Phylum: Mollusca
- Class: Gastropoda
- Subclass: Vetigastropoda
- Order: Trochida
- Family: Skeneidae
- Genus: Haplocochlias
- Species: H. loperi

Binomial name
- Haplocochlias loperi Rubio, Fernández-Garcés & Rolán, 2013

= Haplocochlias loperi =

Species of gastropod

Haplocochlias loperi is a species of sea snail, a marine gastropod mollusc in the family Skeneidae.

== Distribution ==
This marine species occurs off Guadeloupe.
