= Haplocochlias cyclophoreus =

Scientific classification
- Kingdom: Animalia
- Phylum: Mollusca
- Class: Gastropoda
- Subclass: Vetigastropoda
- Order: Trochida
- Family: Skeneidae
- Genus: Haplocochlias
- Species: H. cyclophoreus

Binomial name
- Haplocochlias cyclophoreus Carpenter, 1864

Species of gastropod

Haplocochlias cyclophoreus is a species of sea snail, a marine gastropod mollusk in the family Skeneidae.

== Description ==
The diameter of the shell is 5 mm. The compact, small, solid, shining shell has a whitish or light yellowish color. It contains 5 whorls that enlarge. The suture is impressed. The shell is very minutely spirally striate. The aperture is rounded. The thickened peristome is continuous. and varicose exteriorly. The inner lips aredistinct. The shell is umbilicated in the juvenile, but rimate in the adult.

== Description ==
This species occurs in the Pacific Ocean off Lower California, Mexico.
