= Parviturbo parvissima =

Scientific classification
- Kingdom: Animalia
- Phylum: Mollusca
- Class: Gastropoda
- Subclass: Vetigastropoda
- Order: Trochida
- Family: Skeneidae
- Genus: Parviturbo
- Species: P. parvissima

Binomial name
- Parviturbo parvissima Engl, 2001

Species of gastropod

Parviturbo parvissima is a species of small sea snail, a marine gastropod mollusk in the family Skeneidae.

== Description ==
The size of the shell attains 1 mm.

== Distribution ==
This marine species occurs off Réunion and the Cocos-Keeling Islands, Indian Ocean, but is apparently a Pacific species.
