= Parviturbo comptus =

Scientific classification
- Kingdom: Animalia
- Phylum: Mollusca
- Class: Gastropoda
- Subclass: Vetigastropoda
- Order: Trochida
- Family: Skeneidae
- Genus: Parviturbo
- Species: P. comptus

Binomial name
- Parviturbo comptus (Woodring, 1928)

Synonyms
- Fossarus comptus Woodring, 1928; Parviturboides comptus (Woodring, 1928)

Species of gastropod

Parviturbo comptus is a species of sea snail, a marine gastropod mollusk in the family Skeneidae.

== Description ==
The size of the shell attains 2.3 mm.

== Distribution ==
This species occurs in the Caribbean Sea off Mexico and off the West Indies (Curaçao, Puerto Rico)
