= Haplocochlias nunezi =

Scientific classification
- Kingdom: Animalia
- Phylum: Mollusca
- Class: Gastropoda
- Subclass: Vetigastropoda
- Order: Trochida
- Family: Skeneidae
- Genus: Haplocochlias
- Species: H. nunezi

Binomial name
- Haplocochlias nunezi Espinosa, Ortea & Fernandez-Garces, 2004

Synonyms
- Haplocochlias swifti auct. non Vanatta, 1913

Species of gastropod

Haplocochlias nunezi is a species of sea snail, a marine gastropod mollusk in the family Skeneidae.

== Description ==
The height of the shell attains 5.2 mm.

== Distribution ==
This species occurs in the Gulf of Mexico at depths up to 90 m; in the Atlantic Ocean off the Bahamas.
