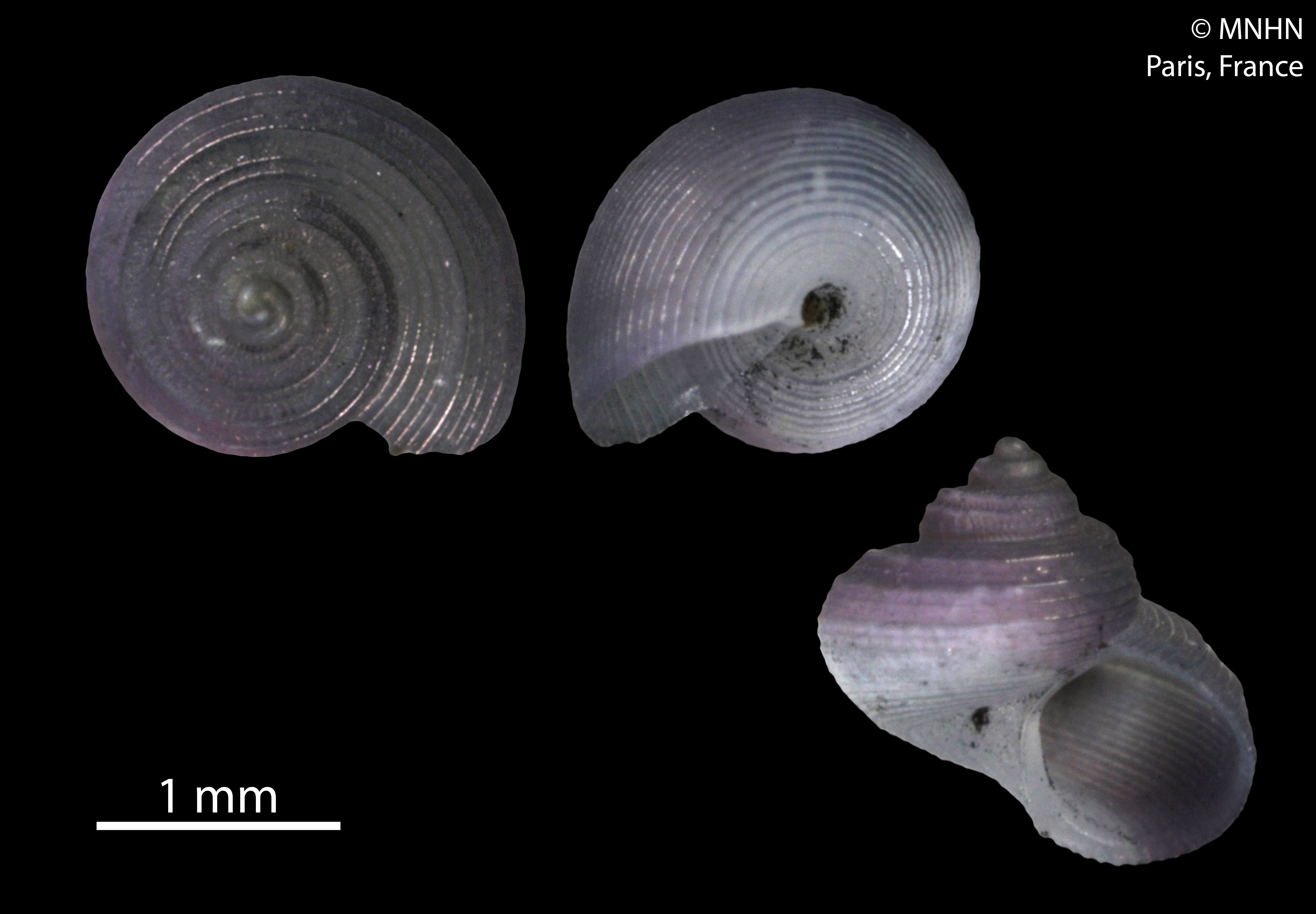
- Shell of Haplocochlias arrondoi (paratype at MNHN, Paris)

Scientific classification
- Kingdom: Animalia
- Phylum: Mollusca
- Class: Gastropoda
- Subclass: Vetigastropoda
- Order: Trochida
- Family: Skeneidae
- Genus: Haplocochlias
- Species: H. arrondoi

Binomial name
- Haplocochlias arrondoi Rubio, Fernández-Garcés & Rolán, 2013

= Haplocochlias arrondoi =

Species of gastropod

Haplocochlias arrondoi is a species of sea snail, a marine gastropod mollusc in the family Skeneidae.

== Distribution ==
This marine species occurs off Cuba at a depth of 30 m to 40 m.
