= Parviturbo rolani =

Scientific classification
- Kingdom: Animalia
- Phylum: Mollusca
- Class: Gastropoda
- Subclass: Vetigastropoda
- Order: Trochida
- Family: Skeneidae
- Genus: Parviturbo
- Species: P. rolani

Binomial name
- Parviturbo rolani Engl, 2001

Species of gastropod

Parviturbo rolani is a species of sea snail, a marine gastropod mollusk in the family Skeneidae.

== Description ==
The size of the shell attains 1.9 mm.

== Distribution ==
This species occurs in the Atlantic Ocean off the Canary Islands at depths between 40 m and 45 m.
