= Parviturbo dibellai =

Scientific classification
- Kingdom: Animalia
- Phylum: Mollusca
- Class: Gastropoda
- Subclass: Vetigastropoda
- Order: Trochida
- Family: Skeneidae
- Genus: Parviturbo
- Species: P. dibellai

Binomial name
- Parviturbo dibellai Buzzurro & Cecalupo, 2007

Species of gastropod

Parviturbo dibellai is a species of sea snail, a marine gastropod mollusk in the family Skeneidae.

== Distribution ==
This species occurs in the Mediterranean Sea off Turkey. It is possibly a Lessepsian immigrant.
