= Parviturbo granulum =

Scientific classification
- Kingdom: Animalia
- Phylum: Mollusca
- Class: Gastropoda
- Subclass: Vetigastropoda
- Order: Trochida
- Family: Skeneidae
- Genus: Parviturbo
- Species: P. granulum

Binomial name
- Parviturbo granulum (Dall, 1889)

Synonyms
- Cyclostrema granulum Dall, 1889

Species of gastropod

Parviturbo granulum is a species of sea snail, a marine gastropod mollusk in the family Skeneidae.

== Description ==
(Original description by W.H. Dall) The size of the shell attains 1 mm in height and breadth. The shell is elevated and compact, having ten or twelve fine strong spiral cinguli, under which are finer radiating raised incremental lines. It is white with a rounded base and a perforate umbilicus, three whorls, a nearly circular aperture, with slightly thickened or expanded margin. For so small a shell it seems remarkably solid and strong.

== Distribution ==
This species occurs in the Caribbean Sea off the Dominican Republic.
