= Haplocochlias harryleei =

Scientific classification
- Kingdom: Animalia
- Phylum: Mollusca
- Class: Gastropoda
- Subclass: Vetigastropoda
- Order: Trochida
- Family: Skeneidae
- Genus: Haplocochlias
- Species: H. harryleei

Binomial name
- Haplocochlias harryleei Rubio, Fernández-Garcés & Rolán, 2013

Species of gastropod

Haplocochlias harryleei is a species of sea snail, a marine gastropod mollusc in the family Skeneidae.

== Distribution ==
This species occurs off Panama.
