= Haplocochlias calidimaris =

Scientific classification
- Kingdom: Animalia
- Phylum: Mollusca
- Class: Gastropoda
- Subclass: Vetigastropoda
- Order: Trochida
- Family: Skeneidae
- Genus: Haplocochlias
- Species: H. calidimaris

Binomial name
- Haplocochlias calidimaris (Pilsbry & McGinty, 1945)

Synonyms
- Parviturbo calidimaris Pilsbry & McGinty, 1945

Species of gastropod

Haplocochlias calidimaris is a species of sea snail, a marine gastropod mollusk in the family Skeneidae.

== Description ==
The size of the shell attains 2 mm.

== Distribution ==
This species occurs in the Gulf of Mexico and in the Caribbean Sea.
