= Parviturboides germanus =

Scientific classification
- Kingdom: Animalia
- Phylum: Mollusca
- Class: Gastropoda
- Subclass: Caenogastropoda
- Order: Littorinimorpha
- Family: Tornidae
- Genus: Parviturboides
- Species: P. germanus

Binomial name
- Parviturboides germanus ( Pilsbry & Olsson, 1945)

Synonyms
- Parviturbo germanus Pilsbry & Olsson, 1945 (original combination)

Species of gastropod

Parviturboides germanus is a species of small sea snail, a marine gastropod mollusk in the family Tornidae.

== Description ==
The height of the subdiscoidal shell attains 0.75 mm, its diameter is 1.3 mm.

== Distribution ==
This species occurs in the Pacific Ocean, off Colombia, and Ecuador.
