= Haplocochlias erici =

Scientific classification
- Kingdom: Animalia
- Phylum: Mollusca
- Class: Gastropoda
- Subclass: Vetigastropoda
- Order: Trochida
- Family: Skeneidae
- Genus: Haplocochlias
- Species: H. erici

Binomial name
- Haplocochlias erici erici

Synonyms
- Liotia erici Strong & Hertlein, 1939 (original combination); Parviturbo erici (Strong & Hertlein, 1939)

Species of gastropod

Haplocochlias erici is a species of sea snail, a marine gastropod mollusk in the family Skeneidae.
