= Haplocochlias williami =

Scientific classification
- Kingdom: Animalia
- Phylum: Mollusca
- Class: Gastropoda
- Subclass: Vetigastropoda
- Order: Trochida
- Family: Skeneidae
- Genus: Haplocochlias
- Species: H. williami

Binomial name
- Haplocochlias williami de Barros et al., 2002

Synonyms
- Haplocochlias onaneyi Espinosa, Ortea & Fernández-Garcés, 2005

Species of gastropod

Haplocochlias williami is a species of sea snail, a marine gastropod mollusk in the family Skeneidae.

== Description ==
The height of the shell attains 2.1 mm.

== Distribution ==
This species occurs in the Atlantic Ocean off Brazil at depths between 15 m and 54 m.
