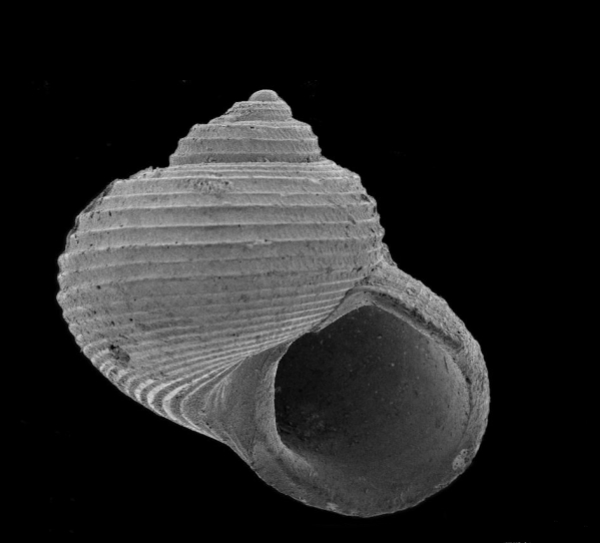
- shell of Haplochochlias turbinus (holotype at the Smithsonian Institution)

Scientific classification
- Kingdom: Animalia
- Phylum: Mollusca
- Class: Gastropoda
- Subclass: Vetigastropoda
- Order: Trochida
- Family: Skeneidae
- Genus: Haplocochlias
- Species: H. turbinus

Binomial name
- Haplocochlias turbinus (Dall, 1889)

Synonyms
- Cyclostrema turbinum Dall, 1889 (original combination); Parviturbo turbinus (Dall, 1889)

= Haplocochlias turbinus =

Species of gastropod

Haplocochlias turbinus is a species of sea snail, a marine gastropod mollusc in the family Skeneidae.

== Description ==
The height of the shell attains 3.3 mm. The small, thin shell has a subconic shape with four rounded whorls and a minute glassy nucleus. The radiating sculpture consists of fine oblique incremental lines, which on the early whorls rise into very fine threads, visible crossing the interspaces of the spiral sculpture. The spiral sculpture consists of (on the body whorl) about seven strong smooth even cinguli on the top of the whorl, and fourteen or fifteen more rather smaller from the periphery to the brink of the umbilicus. There are also a few finer ones, especially three near the suture, and occasionally some spiral striation is faintly indicated. On the top of the whorl the interspaces are about twice as wide as the threads, but not so wide on the base. The whorls, the periphery and the base are evenly rounded. The suture is distinct and not channelled. The umbilicus is perforate, with smoothish walls. The aperture is half as high as the shell. It is oblique, nearly circular, with sharp, simple, slightly expanded edges.

== Distribution ==
This species occurs in the Caribbean Sea and the Gulf of Mexico; in the Atlantic Ocean off North Carolina at depths between 70 m and 200 m.
