= Haplocochlias concepcionensis =

Scientific classification
- Kingdom: Animalia
- Phylum: Mollusca
- Class: Gastropoda
- Subclass: Vetigastropoda
- Order: Trochida
- Family: Skeneidae
- Genus: Haplocochlias
- Species: H. concepcionensis

Binomial name
- Haplocochlias concepcionensis (Lowe, 1933)

Synonyms
- Homalopoma concepcionensis Lowe, 1935 (original combination); Parviturbo concepcionensis (Lowe, 1935)

Species of gastropod

Haplocochlias concepcionensis is a species of sea snail, a marine gastropod mollusk in the family Skeneidae.
