= Parviturboides copiosus =

Scientific classification
- Kingdom: Animalia
- Phylum: Mollusca
- Class: Gastropoda
- Subclass: Caenogastropoda
- Order: Littorinimorpha
- Family: Tornidae
- Genus: Parviturboides
- Species: P. copiosus

Binomial name
- Parviturboides copiosus Pilsbry & Olsson, 1945

Species of gastropod

Parviturboides copiosus is a species of small sea snail, a marine gastropod mollusk in the family Skeneidae.

== Description ==
The height of the shell attains 1.1 mm, its diameter 1.4 mm

== Distribution ==
This species occurs in the Pacific Ocean, off Panama and Ecuador
