= Haplocochlias francesae =

Scientific classification
- Kingdom: Animalia
- Phylum: Mollusca
- Class: Gastropoda
- Subclass: Vetigastropoda
- Order: Trochida
- Family: Skeneidae
- Genus: Haplocochlias
- Species: H. francesae

Binomial name
- Haplocochlias francesae Rubio, Fernández-Garcés & Rolán, 2013

Synonyms
- Parviturbo francesae Pilsbry & McGinty, 1945

Species of gastropod

Haplocochlias francesae is a species of small sea snail, a marine gastropod mollusc in the family Skeneidae.

== Distribution ==
This species occurs in the Gulf of Mexico.
