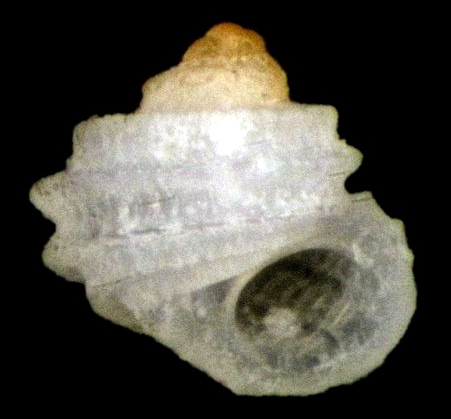
- Shell of Lophocochlias parvissimus (specimen at Naturalis Biodiversity Center)

Scientific classification
- Kingdom: Animalia
- Phylum: Mollusca
- Class: Gastropoda
- Subclass: Caenogastropoda
- Order: Littorinimorpha
- Superfamily: Truncatelloidea
- Family: Tornidae
- Genus: Lophocochlias
- Species: L. parvissimus

Binomial name
- Lophocochlias parvissimus (Pilsbry, 1921)

Synonyms
- Haplocochlias (Lophocochlias) minutissimus Pilsbry, 1921 (original combination); Liotia parvissima Hedley, 1899 (original combination); Lophocochlias minutissimus (Pilsbry, 1921); Parviturbo parvissimus (Hedley, 1899); Parviturboides parvissimus (Hedley, 1899)

= Lophocochlias parvissimus =

Species of gastropod

Lophocochlias parvissimus is a species of sea snail, a marine gastropod mollusk in the family Tornidae.

== Description ==
The height of the shell attains 1 mm, its diameter 0.9 mm. The very small, white shell is umbilicate, turbinate, not nacreous, with a conic brownish spire. The first whorl appears to be smooth. On the second whorl fine radial folds or puckering appears below the suture, becoming coarser on the following whorl. The body whorl has six strong, smooth spiral keels, narrower than the intervals, which are flat and crossed by numerous retractively axial threads, which are much narrower than their intervals. Within the umbilicus, two rather small spiral cords are visible. The aperture is quite oblique and subcircular. The outer lip is strengthened by a rounded external rib or varix a short distance behind the edge.

== Distribution ==
This marine species occurs in the Pacific Ocean off Hawaii and Tuvalu.
