= Johannesson =

Johannesson is a surname of Swedish or Icelandic origin, meaning son of Johannes. In Icelandic names the name is not strictly a surname, but a patronymic. In Icelandic names the name is spelled Jóhannesson, with the accent acute over the ó. The name refers to:

- Árni Grétar Jóhannesson (1983–2025), Icelandic electronic musician
- Axella Johannesson (born 1958), Australian singer and songwriter
- Berit Jóhannesson (born 1946), Swedish politician; member of the Riksdag 1998–2006
- Daniel Jóhannesson (born 2007), Icelandic footballer
- Jón Ásgeir Jóhannesson (born 1968), Icelandic businessman and investment manager
- Karen H. Johannesson, American geochemist
- Kerstin Johannesson (born 1955), Swedish biologist
- Konrad Johannesson (1896–1968), Canadian professional ice hockey player
- Laurel Johannesson, Canadian artist
- Markus Johannesson (born 1975), Swedish professional football player
- Mona Johannesson (born 1987), Swedish model
- Ólafur Jóhannesson (born 1957), Icelandic professional football manager
- Ólafur Jóhannesson (1913–1984), Icelandic politician; prime minister of Iceland 1971–1974 and 1978–79
- Richard Johannesson (born 1969), Canadian businessman
- Samuel Johannesson (born 2000), Swedish ice hockey player
