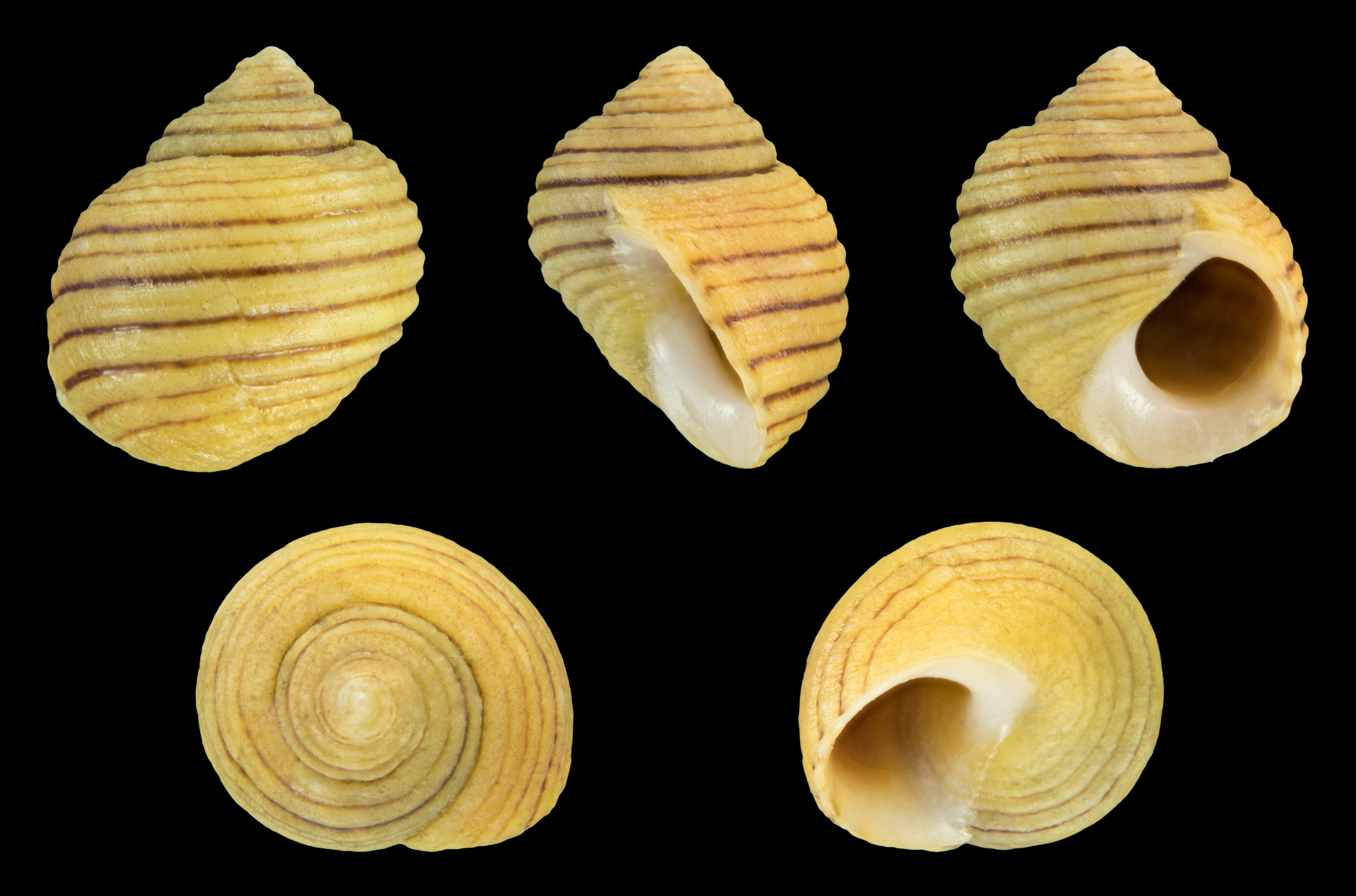

Scientific classification
- Kingdom: Animalia
- Phylum: Mollusca
- Class: Gastropoda
- Subclass: Caenogastropoda
- Order: Littorinimorpha
- Family: Littorinidae
- Genus: Littorina
- Species: L. compressa

Binomial name
- Littorina compressa Jeffreys, 1865

Synonyms
- Litorina macerwinii Philipi, 1847; Litorina merwinii Philipi, 1846; Littorina nigrolineata Philippi, 1846; Littorina rudis var. compressa Jeffreys, 1865; Littorina rudis var. lutea Dautzenberg & Durouchoux, 1900; Littorina saxatilis nigrolineata var. matoni Dautzenberg & P. Fisher, 1912; Littorina saxatilis rudis var. jugosoides James, 1968; Littorina saxatilis var. cinerea Fischer-Piette & Gaillard, 1971; Littorina saxatilis var. miniata Dautzenberg & P. Fisher, 1912; Turbo sulcatus Leach, 1852

= Littorina compressa =

Species of gastropod

Littorina compressa is a species of sea snail, a marine gastropod mollusk in the family Littorinidae, the winkles or periwinkles.

Littorina compressa are native to Western Europe, and have also been found in the North Atlantic sea and in Russia.

Littorina compressa share are extremely similar in appearance to their sibling species Littorina saxatilis and Littorina arcana. The three species have been found to grow together.
