= Littorina scutulata =

Scientific classification
- Kingdom: Animalia
- Phylum: Mollusca
- Class: Gastropoda
- Subclass: Caenogastropoda
- Order: Littorinimorpha
- Family: Littorinidae
- Genus: Littorina
- Species: L. scutulata

Binomial name
- Littorina scutulata Gould, 1849

Synonyms
- Littorina lepida Gould, 1849

Species of mollusc

Littorina scutulata, the checkered periwinkle, is a species of sea snail, a marine gastropod mollusk in the family Littorinidae, the winkles or periwinkles.

This species lives lower on rocks than does L. keenae, and migrates up and down rocks with the tide. It crawls out of tidepools at night. Often, it hides at low tide in cracks or barnacle shells. The waves on both sides of the foot are out of phase with one another (ditaxic). It feeds mainly on diatom films, microscopic algae, lichens, etc., and will also feed on Pelvetia, Ulva, and other larger algae. L. scutulata breeds in all seasons except summer. Eggs are laid underwater, individually packaged in flattened capsules within a sausage-shaped gelatinous mass coiled in a spiral and holding over 2000 eggs. Its eye anatomy is similar to that of the land snail Helix aspera. In Oregon, over 10% of individuals harbor parasitic flukes. Leptasterias hexactis feeds on this snail. It is distributed from Kodiak Island, Alaska, to Bahia de Tortuga, Baja California.

In 2015, an unusual case of L. scutulata being found inside the human body occurred in San Pedro, Los Angeles, when an immature specimen was found inside the knee joint of an eleven year-old boy who had recently fallen and injured his knee on a rock while exploring a tide pool. The force of the impact with the rock drove the snail into the patient’s skin, and it was able to survive despite the formation of an abscess by the immune system around it.
