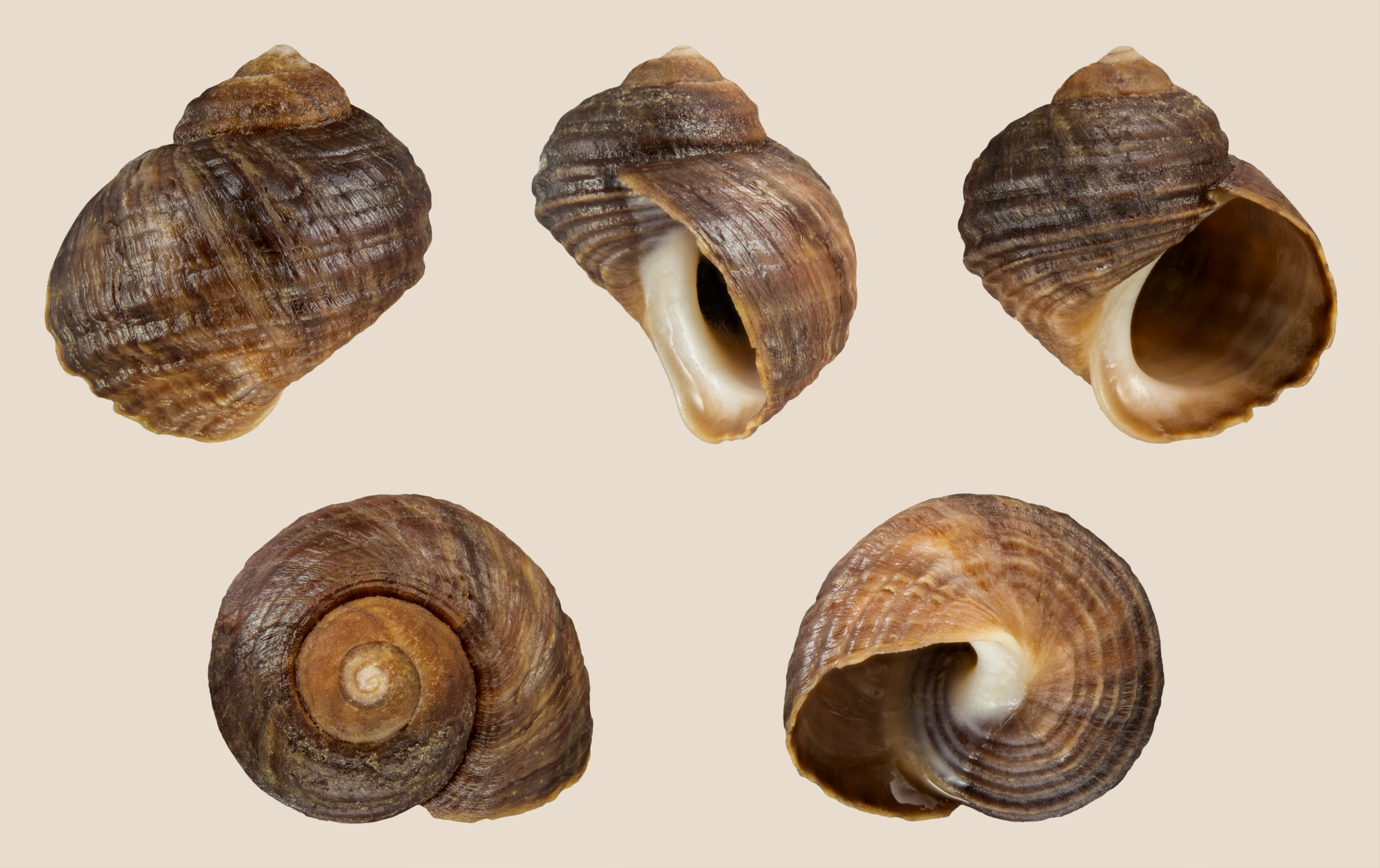

Scientific classification
- Kingdom: Animalia
- Phylum: Mollusca
- Class: Gastropoda
- Subclass: Caenogastropoda
- Order: Littorinimorpha
- Family: Littorinidae
- Genus: Littorina
- Species: L. sitkana

Binomial name
- Littorina sitkana Philippi, 1846

Synonyms
- Litorina gouldiana Weinkauff, 1882; Litorina sitchana Philippi, 1847; Litorina sitkana (Philippi, 1846); Litorina sitkana var. atkana Dall, 1886; Litorina sulcata Carpenter, 1864; Litorina terebrosa (Montagu, 1803); Litorina terebrosa f. depressior Schrenk, 1867; Litorina terebrosa var. albida Schrenk, 1867; Litorina terebrosa var. fasciata Schrenk, 1867; Litorina terebrosa var. fusca Schrenk, 1867; Litorina terebrosa var. laevigata Schrenk, 1867; Littorina castanea A. Adams & Reeve, 1850; Littorina cincta Gould, 1847; Littorina kurila Middendorff, 1848; Littorina kurila var. costulata Middendorff, 1851; Littorina kurila var. fasciatus Middendorff, 1851; Littorina kurila var. fuscus Middendorff, 1851; Littorina kurila var. griseolacteus Middendorff, 1851; Littorina kurila var. zonatus Middendorff, 1851; Littorina sitchana (Philippi, 1847); Littorina sitchana var. castaneus Middendorff, 1849; Littorina sitchana var. zonatus Middendorff, 1849; Littorina sitchensis Nevill, 1885; Littorina subtenebrosa Middendorff, 1848; Melarhaphe zelandiae Finlay, 1927

= Littorina sitkana =

Species of gastropod

Littorina sitkana is a species of small sea snail, a marine gastropod mollusc in the family Littorinidae, the winkles. It is commonly found in the high tidal zone and the splash zone.

== Description ==
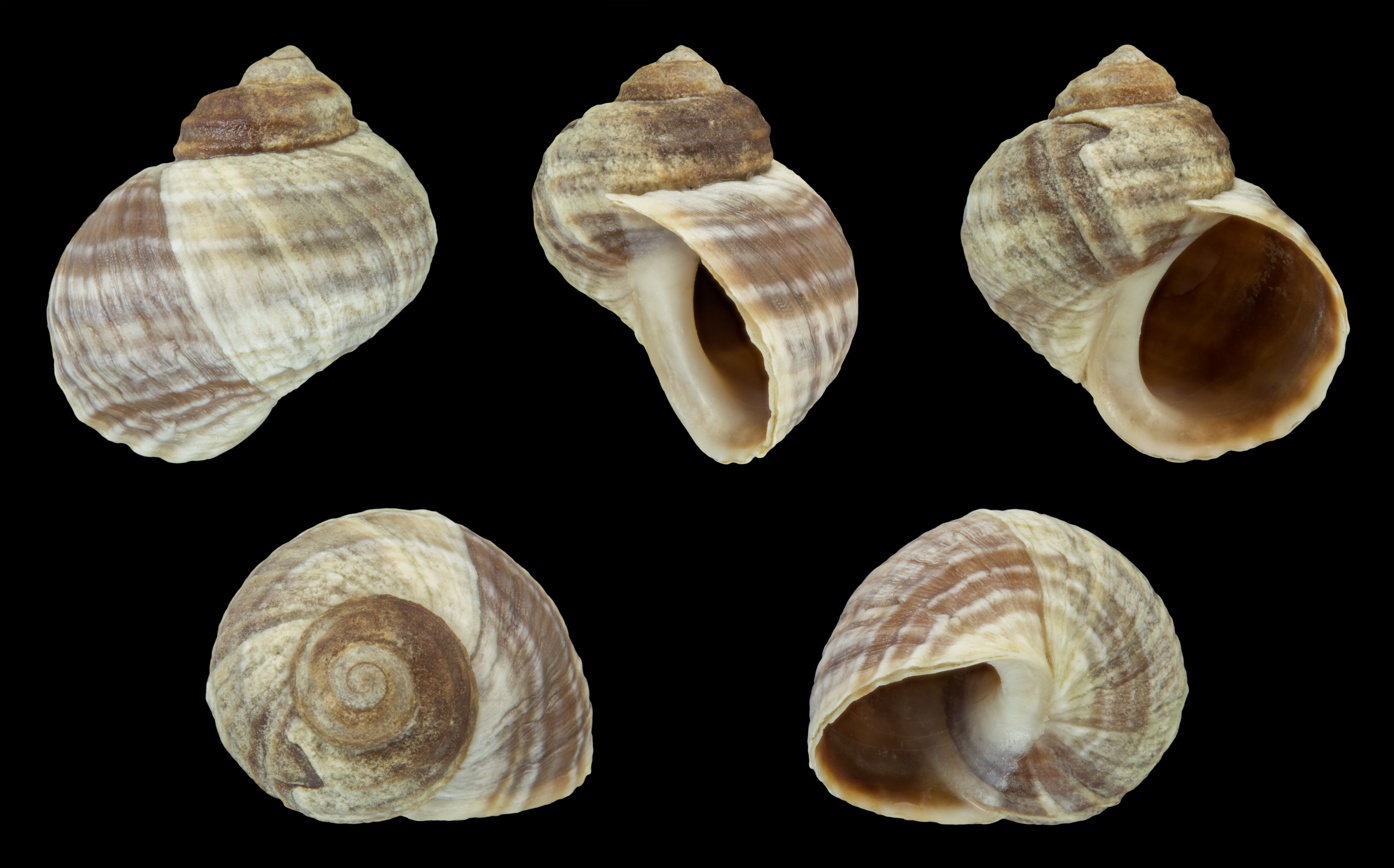
var. zonata

The shell of this winkle has about ten coarse spiral ribs on the last whorl, and has fine spiral microstriae in the gaps between the ribs. Occasionally this ribbing may be missing or it may be ribbed only at the base. The species with which it is most likely to be confused is Littorina subrotundata and comparison of the capsule gland of the pallial oviduct is the best way to distinguish between them.

== Distribution ==
The native range of L. sitkana is the coasts of Siberia, Japan and the Pacific coast of North America extending from Alaska to Oregon.
