= Turbo muricatus =

Turbo muricatus may refer to:

- Turbo muricatus Linnaeus, 1758 is a synonym of Cenchritis muricatus (Linnaeus, 1758)
- Turbo muricatus Usticke, 1959 is a synonym of Turbo castanea Gmelin, 1791
