= Glycosulfatase =

Class of enzymes

Identifiers
- EC no.: 3.1.6.3
- CAS no.: 9025-61-0

Databases
- BRENDA: enzyme data
- ExPASy: NiceZyme view
- KEGG: enzyme entry
- MetaCyc: metabolic pathway
- Rhea: reactions
- PDB structures: RCSB PDB PDBe PDBsum
- Gene Ontology: AmiGO / QuickGO
Search
- PMC: articles
- PubMed: articles
- NCBI: proteins

The enzyme Glycosulfatase (EC 3.1.6.3) catalyzes the reaction

D-glucose 6-sulfate
H_{2}O
H_{2}SO_{4}
D-glucose

The enzyme characterised from Littorina species hydrolyses D-glucose 6-sulfate to D-glucose (both shown in their aldehydo forms).

This enzyme bis a hydrolase, specifically one acting on sulfuric ester bonds. The systematic name of this enzyme class is sugar-sulfate sulfohydrolase. This enzyme is also called glucosulfatase.
