= Kerstin Johannesson =

Swedish biologist (born 1955)

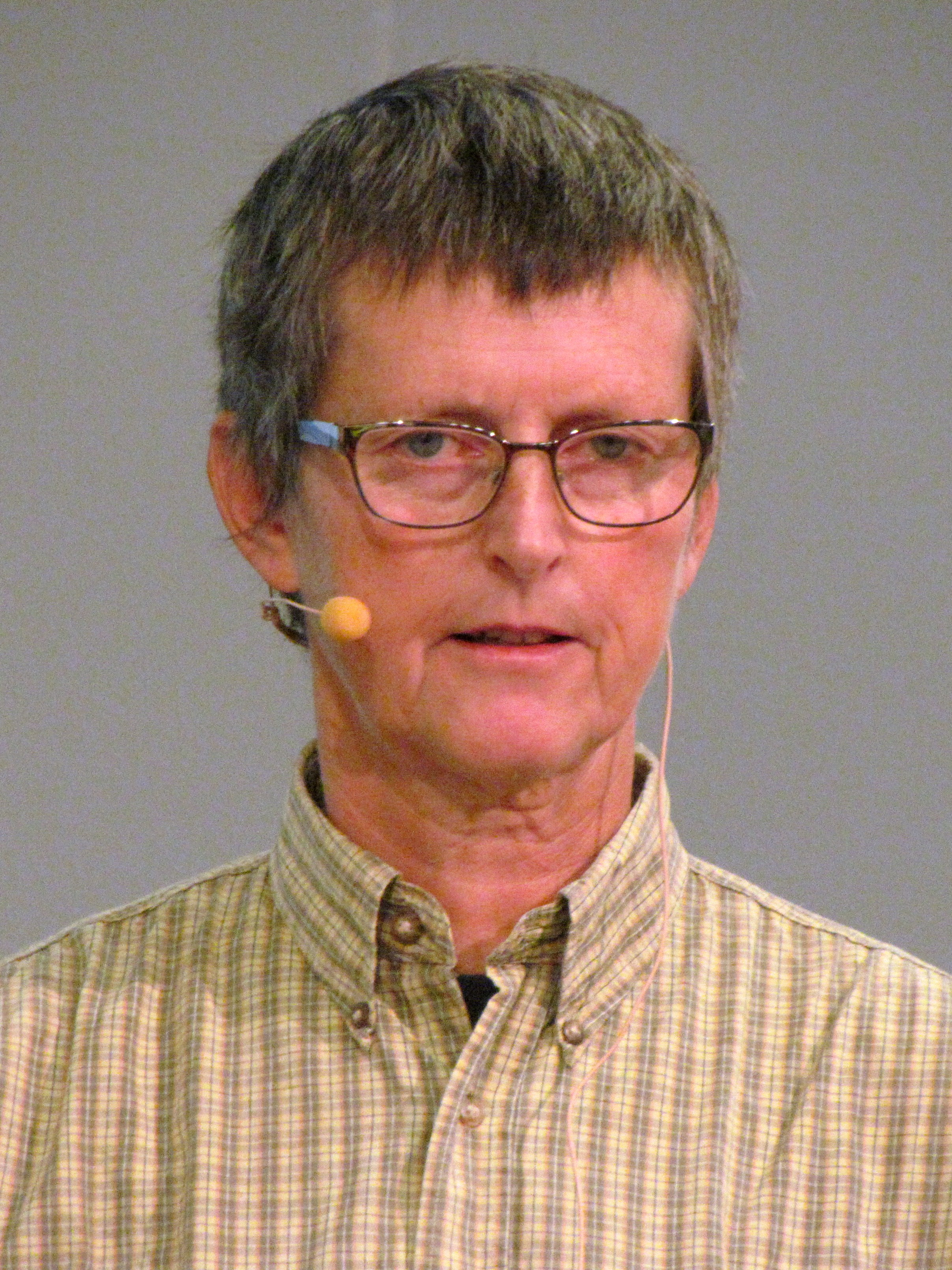
Johannesson at the Gothenburg Book Fair in 2011

Kerstin Johannesson (born 1955) is a Swedish biologist. She works at the University of Gothenburg, where she researches marine periwinkles as model systems for marine evolution. In 2022 Johannesson won the Molecular Ecology Prize. She is an elected member of the Royal Swedish Academy of Sciences.

== Life ==
From the age of fifteen, Johannesson resided on the island of Tjärnö in Strömstad Municipality during the summer, where the University of Gothenburg's Tjärnö Marine Biological Laboratory was located. Living on Tjärnö inspired Johannesson's interest in marine sciences, and she later attended the University of Gothenburg to study biology, despite her school career counsellor recommending she become a hairdresser instead. She earned her PhD at Gothenburg, supervised by Dave Raffaelli and Bob Ward. She subsequently joined the University of Gothenburg's faculty, and became an elected member of the Royal Swedish Academy of Sciences.

Johannesson's research focuses on the use of marine periwinkles (especially Littorina saxatilis and L. fabalis) as model systems to understand evolutionary biology. She has long-term research studies based at Tjärnö Marine Biological Laboratory, but has also contributed to work to understand evolution in the low-salinity environment of the Baltic Sea.

In 2016 Johannesson won the Swedish Kunskapspriset award, which rewards science communication. Johannesson led a children's television programme, Havsforskarna, about marine biology. In 2022 Johannesson won the Molecular Ecology Prize.
