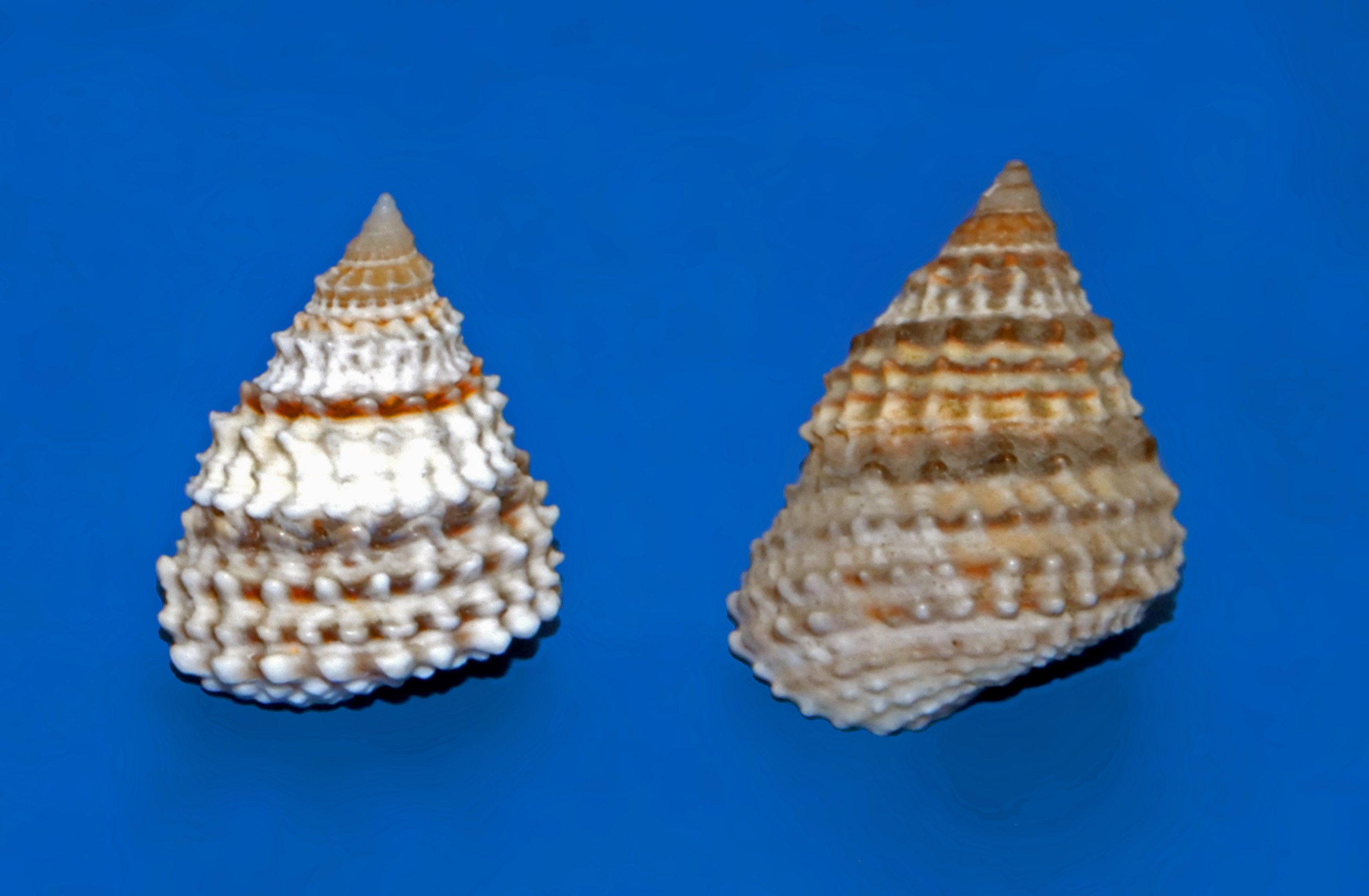
- Shell of Tectarius coronatus at the Museo Civico di Storia Naturale di Milano

Scientific classification
- Kingdom: Animalia
- Phylum: Mollusca
- Class: Gastropoda
- Subclass: Caenogastropoda
- Order: Littorinimorpha
- Family: Littorinidae
- Genus: Tectarius; Valenciennes, 1833

Type species
- Tectarius coronatus Valenciennes, 1833

Synonyms
- Cidaris Röding, 1798 (Invalid: junior homonym of Cidaris Leske, 1778 [Echinodermata]); Echinella Swainson, 1840; Echinellopsis Rovereto, 1899; Echininus Clench & Abbott, 1942; Liralittorina Rosewater, 1981; Nina Gray, 1850 (Invalid: junior homonym of Nina Horsfield, 1829 [Lepidoptera]; Echininus is a replacement name); Pagodella Swainson, 1840; Pagodus Gray, 1839; Tectaria (misspelling); Tectarius (Echininiopsis) D.G. Reid, 1989; Tectarius (Echininus) Clench & Abbott, 1942; Tectarius (Tectininus) Clench & Abbott, 1942; Tectininus Clench & Abbott, 1942

= Tectarius =

Genus of gastropods

Tectarius is a genus of sea snails, marine gastropod molluscs in the family Littorinidae, the winkles or periwinkles.

== Species ==
Species within the genus Tectarius include:

- Tectarius antonii (Philippi, 1846)
- Tectarius coronatus Valenciennes, 1833
- Tectarius cumingii (Philippi, 1846)
- Tectarius grandinatus (Gmelin, 1791)
- Tectarius niuensis Reid & Geller, 1997
- Tectarius pagodus (Linnaeus, 1758)
- Tectarius rusticus (Philippi, 1846)
- Tectarius spinulosus (Philippi, 1847)
- Tectarius striatus (King & Broderip, 1832)
- Tectarius tectumpersicum (Linnaeus, 1758)
- Tectarius viviparus (Rosewater, 1982)

Species brought into synonymy

- Tectarius bullatus (Martyn, 1784): synonym of Tectarius grandinatus (Gmelin, 1791)
- Tectarius feejeensis (Reeve, 1857): synonym of Echinolittorina feejeensis (Reeve, 1857)
- Tectarius granosus (Philippi, 1845): synonym of Echinolittorina granosa (Philippi, 1845)
- Tectarius miliaris (Quoy & Gaimard, 1832): synonym of Echinolittorina miliaris (Quoy & Gaimard, 1833)
- Tectarius montrouzieri P. Fischer, 1878: synonym of Perrinia angulifera (A. Adams, 1853)
- Tectarius muricatus (Linnaeus, 1758): synonym of Cenchritis muricatus (Linnaeus, 1758)

Subgenus Tectarius (Echininus) represented as Echininus Clench & Abbott, 1942 (alternate representation)
