= Littorina horikawai =

Scientific classification
- Kingdom: Animalia
- Phylum: Mollusca
- Class: Gastropoda
- Subclass: Caenogastropoda
- Order: Littorinimorpha
- Family: Littorinidae
- Genus: Littorina
- Species: L. horikawai

Binomial name
- Littorina horikawai Matsubayashi & Habe in Habe, 1979

Species of gastropod

Littorina horikawai is a species of sea snail, a marine gastropod mollusk in the family Littorinidae, the winkles or periwinkles.
