= Tectarius viviparus =

Scientific classification
- Kingdom: Animalia
- Phylum: Mollusca
- Class: Gastropoda
- Subclass: Caenogastropoda
- Order: Littorinimorpha
- Family: Littorinidae
- Genus: Tectarius
- Species: T. viviparus

Binomial name
- Tectarius viviparus (Rosewater, 1982)

Synonyms
- Echininus viviparus Rosewater, 1982

Species of gastropod

Tectarius viviparus is a species of sea snail, a marine gastropod mollusk in the family Littorinidae, the winkles or periwinkles.
