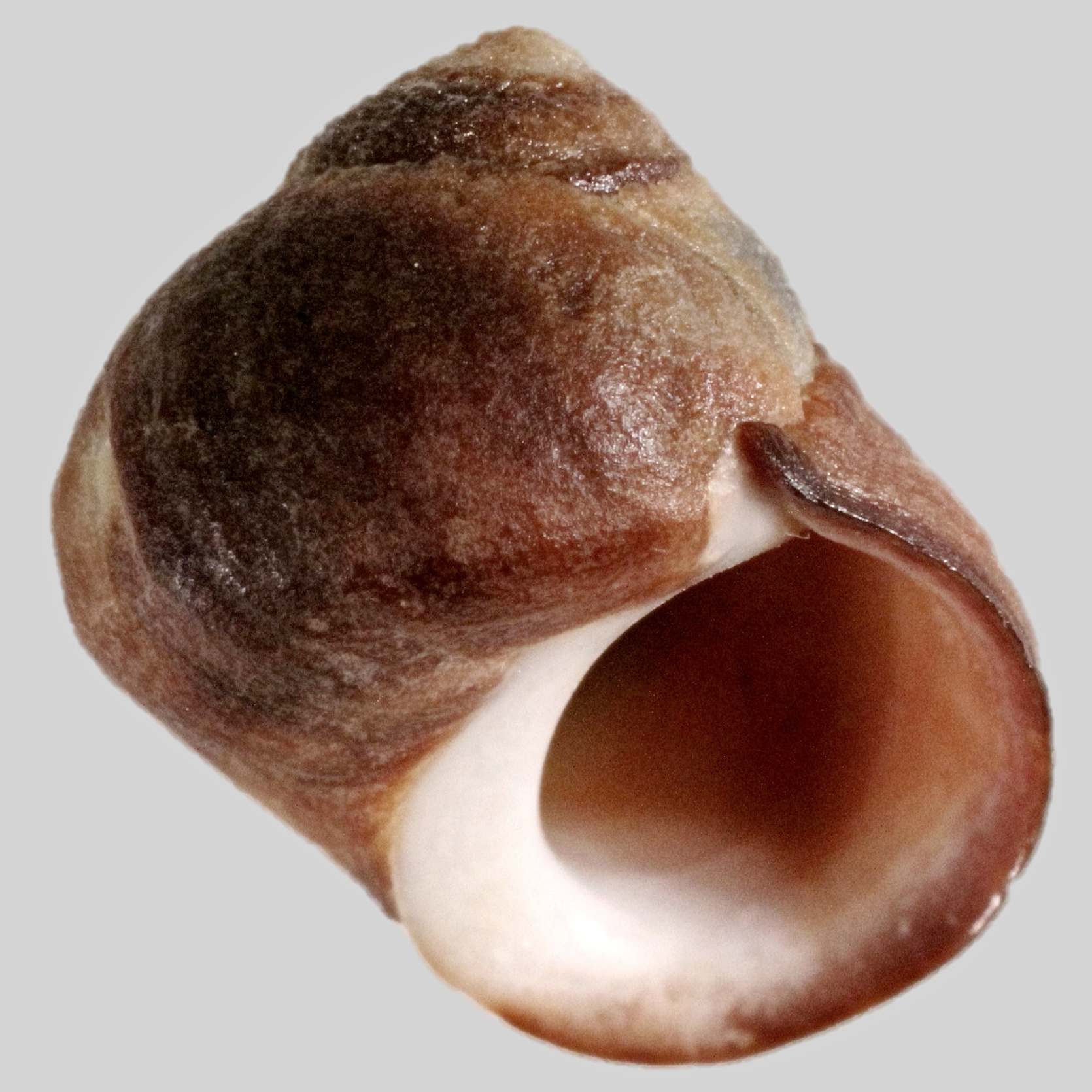

Scientific classification
- Kingdom: Animalia
- Phylum: Mollusca
- Class: Gastropoda
- Subclass: Caenogastropoda
- Order: Littorinimorpha
- Family: Littorinidae
- Genus: Littorina
- Species: L. mandshurica

Binomial name
- Littorina mandshurica (Schrenk, 1861)

Synonyms
- Litorina mandshurica Schrenk, 1861; Litorina mandshurica f. depressior Schrenk, 1867; Litorina mandshurica f. elatior Schrenk, 1867; Litorina mandshurica var. carinata Schrenk, 1867; Litorina mandshurica var. laevigata Schrenk, 1867

= Littorina mandshurica =

Species of gastropod

Littorina mandshurica is a species of sea snail, a marine gastropod mollusk in the family Littorinidae, the winkles or periwinkles.
