= Littorina squalida =

Scientific classification
- Kingdom: Animalia
- Phylum: Mollusca
- Class: Gastropoda
- Subclass: Caenogastropoda
- Order: Littorinimorpha
- Family: Littorinidae
- Genus: Littorina
- Species: L. squalida

Binomial name
- Littorina squalida Broderip & Sowerby, 1829

Synonyms
- Littorina etolonensis Sinelnikova in Gladenkov & Sinelnikova, 1990; Littorina grandis Middendorff, 1848; Littorina praesqualida Sinelnikova in Gladenkov & Sinelnikova, 1990

Species of gastropod

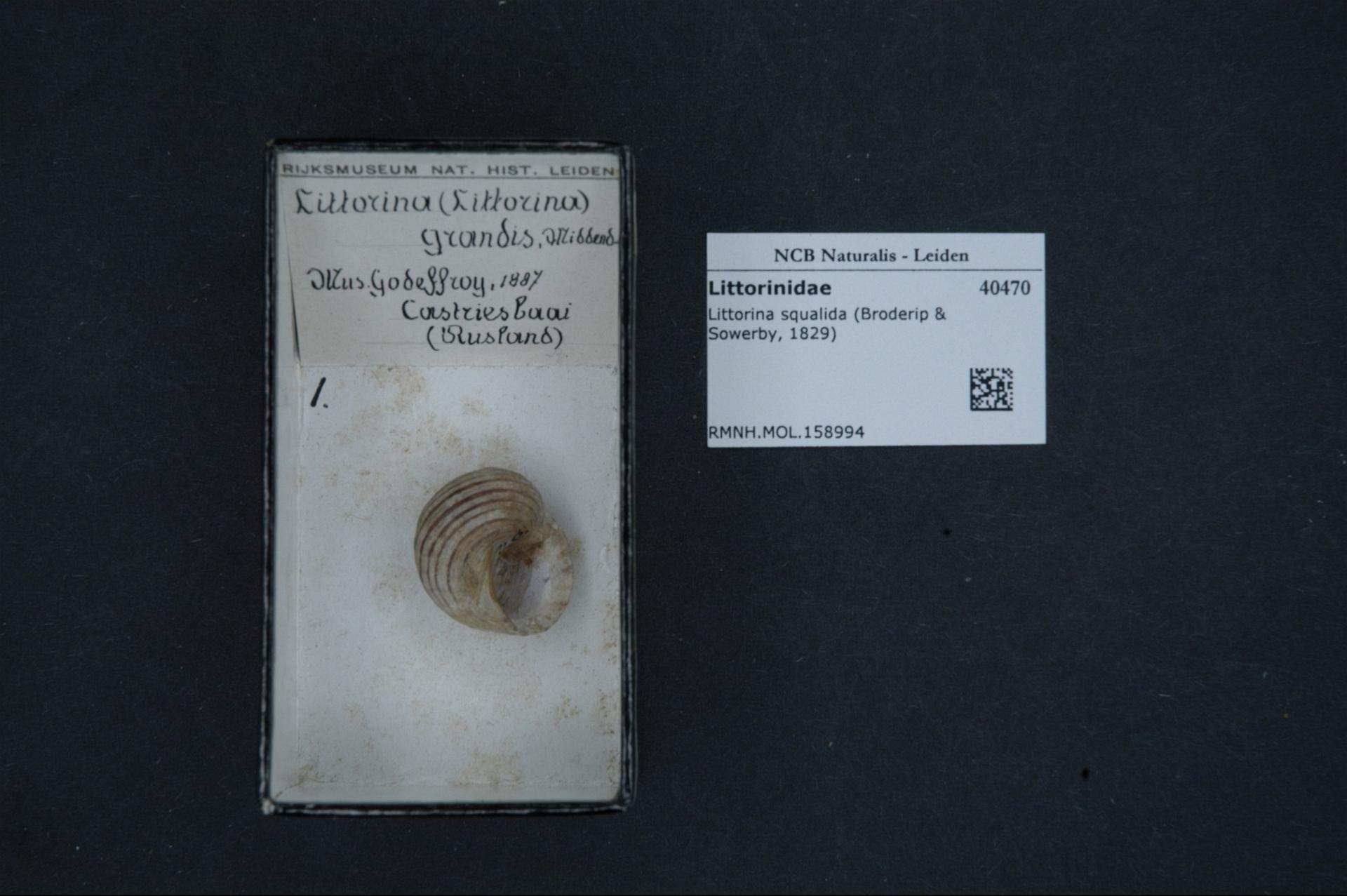
Littorina squalida

Littorina squalida is a species of sea snail, a marine gastropod mollusk in the family Littorinidae, the winkles or periwinkles.
