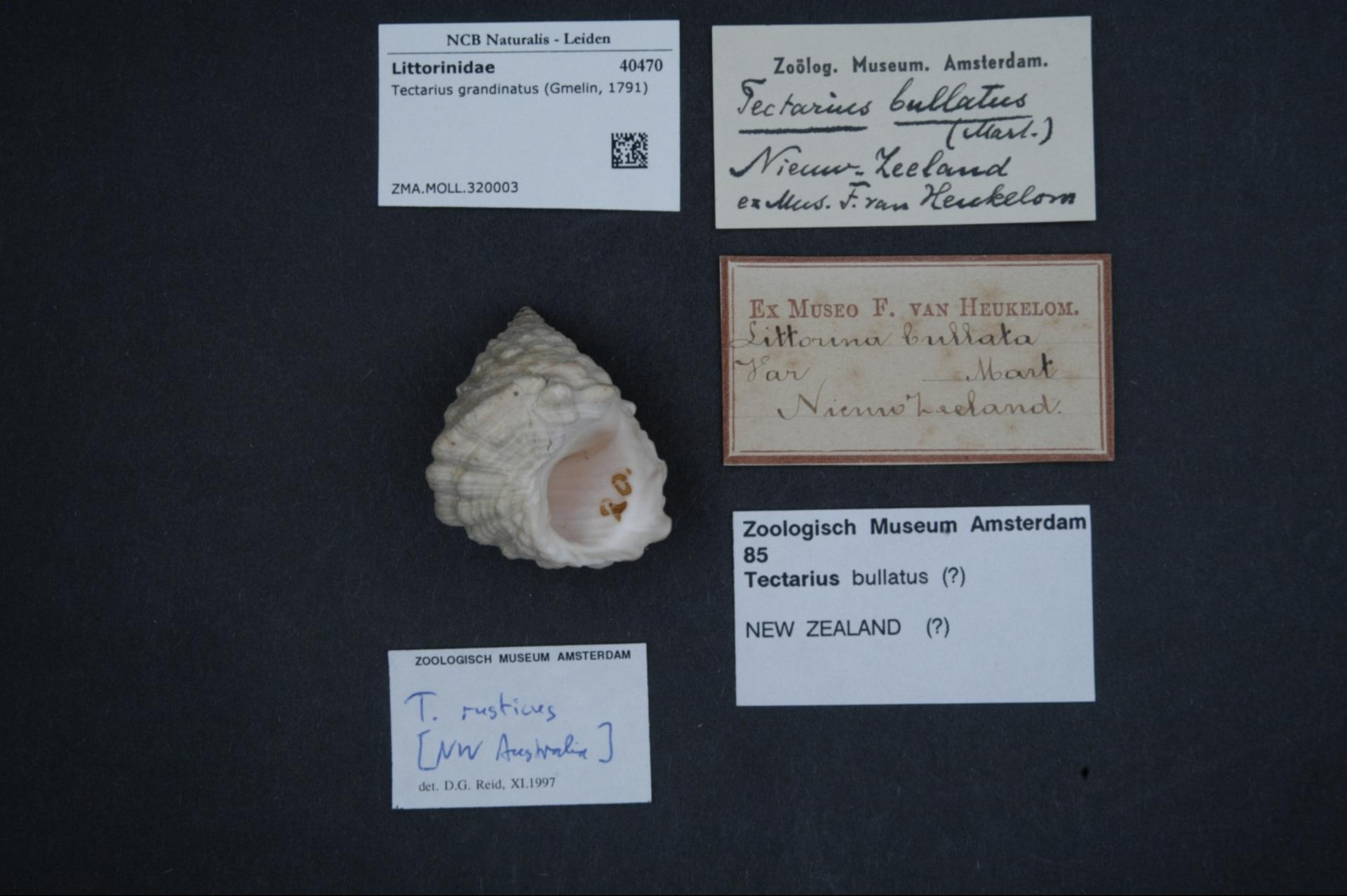

Scientific classification
- Kingdom: Animalia
- Phylum: Mollusca
- Class: Gastropoda
- Subclass: Caenogastropoda
- Order: Littorinimorpha
- Family: Littorinidae
- Genus: Tectarius
- Species: T. grandinatus

Binomial name
- Tectarius grandinatus (Gmelin, 1791)

Synonyms
- Monodonta coronaria Lamarck, 1816; Tectarius bullatus (Martyn, 1784); Trochus bullatus Martyn, 1784

= Tectarius grandinatus =

Species of gastropod

Tectarius grandinatus is a species of sea snail, a marine gastropod mollusk in the family Littorinidae, the winkles or periwinkles.
