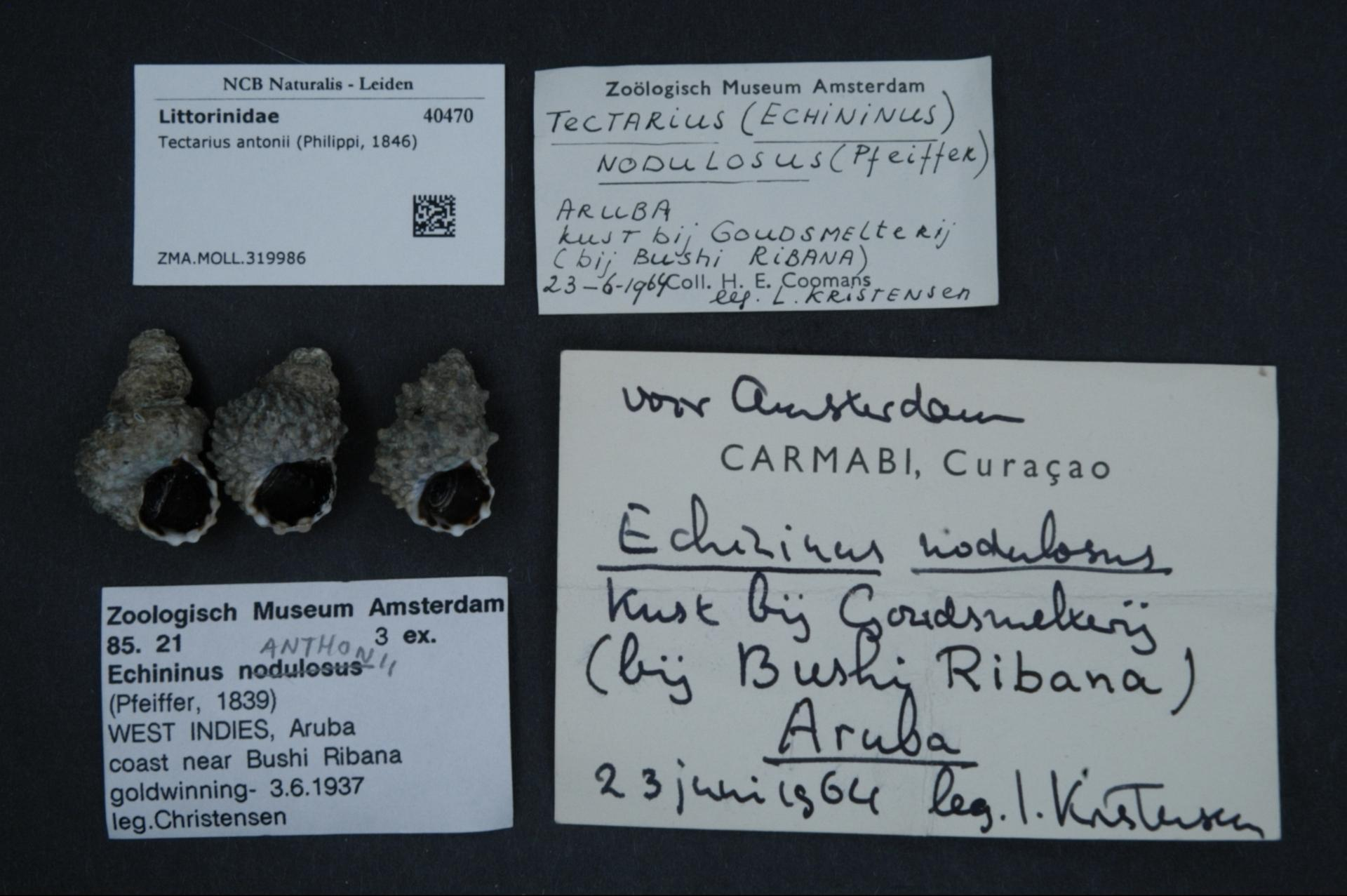
- Tectarius antonii shells

Scientific classification
- Kingdom: Animalia
- Phylum: Mollusca
- Class: Gastropoda
- Subclass: Caenogastropoda
- Order: Littorinimorpha
- Family: Littorinidae
- Genus: Tectarius
- Species: T. antonii

Binomial name
- Tectarius antonii (Philippi, 1846)

Synonyms
- Cenchritis antonii (Philippi, R.A., 1846); Cenchritis nodulosus major (f) Nowell-Usticke, G.W., 1969; Echininus nodulosus Clench & Abbott, 1942; Litorina scabra Anton, 1838

= Tectarius antonii =

Species of gastropod

Tectarius antonii is a species of sea snail, a marine gastropod mollusc in the family Littorinidae, the winkles or periwinkles.

== Description ==
The maximum recorded shell length is 21 mm.

== Distribution ==
This species occurs in the Gulf of Mexico, the Caribbean Sea and the Lesser Antilles.

== Habitat ==
Minimum recorded depth is -2 m. Maximum recorded depth is 0 m.
