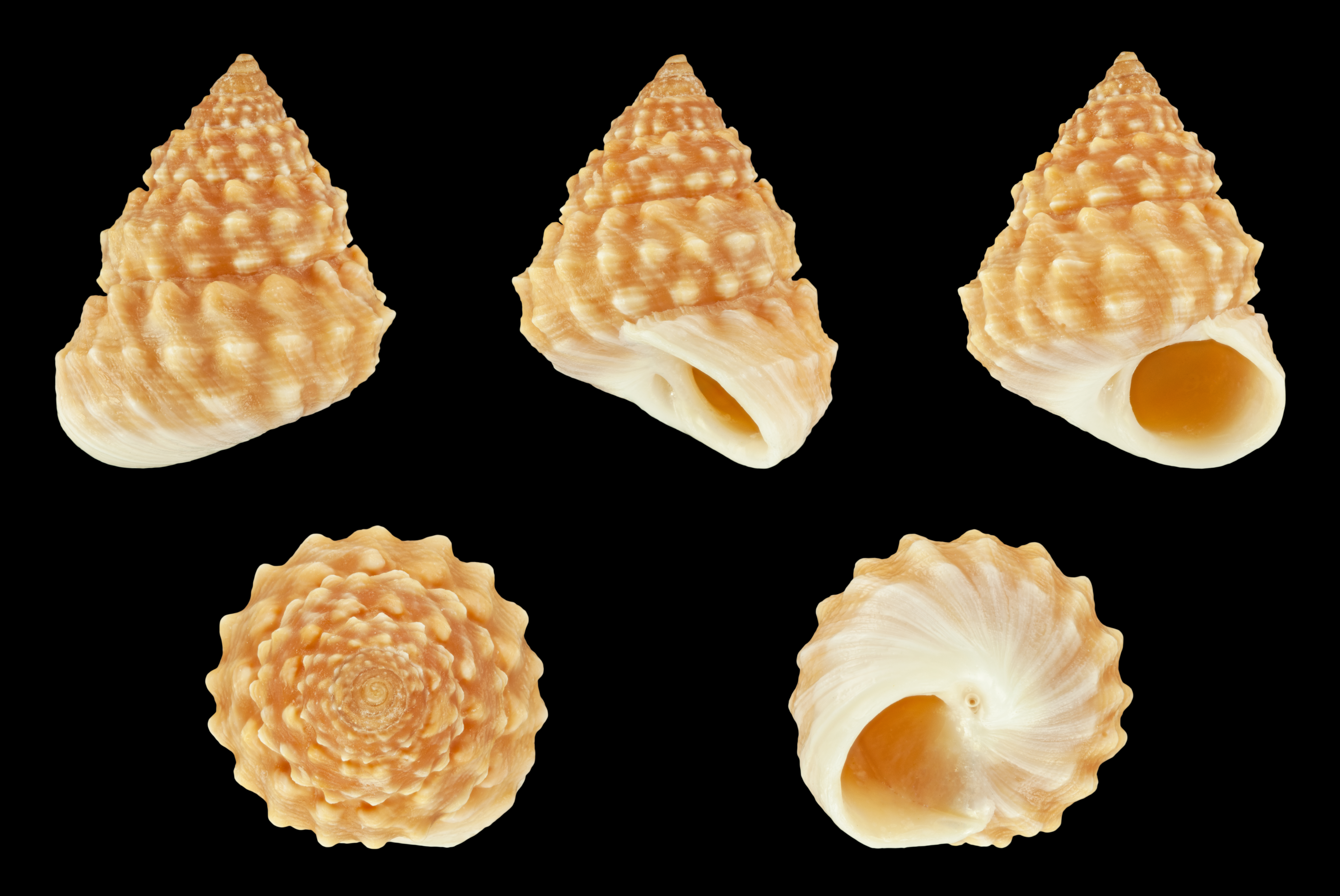

Scientific classification
- Kingdom: Animalia
- Phylum: Mollusca
- Class: Gastropoda
- Subclass: Caenogastropoda
- Order: Littorinimorpha
- Family: Littorinidae
- Genus: Tectarius
- Species: T. spinulosus

Binomial name
- Tectarius spinulosus (Philippi, 1847)

= Tectarius spinulosus =

Species of gastropod

Tectarius spinulosus is a species of sea snail, a marine gastropod mollusk in the family Littorinidae, the winkles or periwinkles.
