= Littorina natica =

Scientific classification
- Kingdom: Animalia
- Phylum: Mollusca
- Class: Gastropoda
- Subclass: Caenogastropoda
- Order: Littorinimorpha
- Family: Littorinidae
- Genus: Littorina
- Species: L. natica

Binomial name
- Littorina natica Reid, 1996

Synonyms
- Littorina naticoides Reid & Golikov, 1991

Species of gastropod

Littorina natica is a species of sea snail, a marine gastropod mollusk in the family Littorinidae, the winkles or periwinkles.
