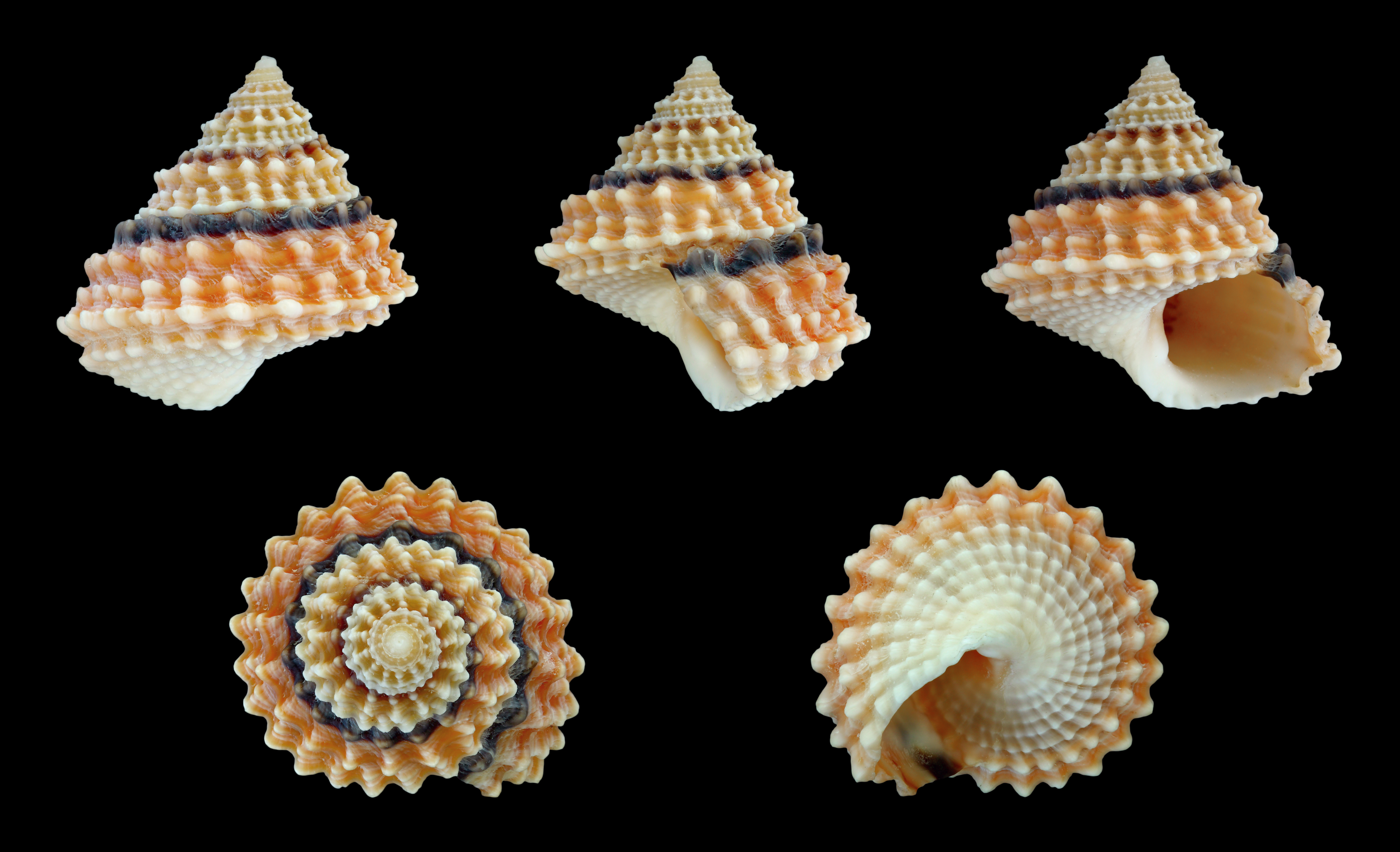

Scientific classification
- Kingdom: Animalia
- Phylum: Mollusca
- Class: Gastropoda
- Subclass: Caenogastropoda
- Order: Littorinimorpha
- Family: Littorinidae
- Genus: Tectarius
- Species: T. coronatus

Binomial name
- Tectarius coronatus Valenciennes, 1833

= Tectarius coronatus =

Species of gastropod

Tectarius coronatus, common name beaded prickly winkle or coronate prickly-winkle, is a species of sea snail, a marine gastropod mollusk in the family Littorinidae, the winkles or periwinkles. It is the type species of the genus Tectarius and is native to the limestone coasts of islands in the western Pacific Ocean.

== Taxonomy ==
T. coronatus is the type species of the genus Tectarius and was first described by the French zoologist Achille Valenciennes in 1833. In 1972, Rosewater made a revision of the genus and placed it in the subgenus tectarius.

== Description ==
The species has a trochoidal shell that reaches a size of 20–40 millimetres (0.79–1.57 in). The spire is broad and surface of this shell is distinctively sculptured, being prickly or nodulose. The basic color is light orange or pale brown, with dark brown bands and a creamy-white interior.

== Distribution ==
T. coronatus is found in the tropical western Pacific Ocean, in Japan, Indonesia and the Philippines. It occurs on rock high in the intertidal zone, extending to considerably above the high tide mark.

== Ecology ==
It is found exclusively on karstic limestone rocks and cliffs, sometimes in the splashzone several meters above the high tide mark. This is an extremely challenging environment for the mollusk where it is exposed to extreme heat, desiccation, high salinity, and sometimes low salinity (in the torrential tropical rain); in fact the genus name "Tectarius" comes from the Latin meaning "tolerant of difficult conditions" or "avoiding confrontations", while "coronatus" means "crowned". The mollusc thus avoids competition from other animals for food and is safe from many aquatic predators.

=== Life cycle ===
The sexes are separate in this species, with the eggs and sperm being liberated into the sea. The fertilised eggs develop into trochophore larvae, which form part of the plankton, and later develop into veliger larvae. When sufficiently developed, these settle on the seabed and undergo metamorphosis into juvenile mollusks.

== Human use ==
The winkle is sometimes used as food, but the mollusk is more often gathered for its colorful shell.
