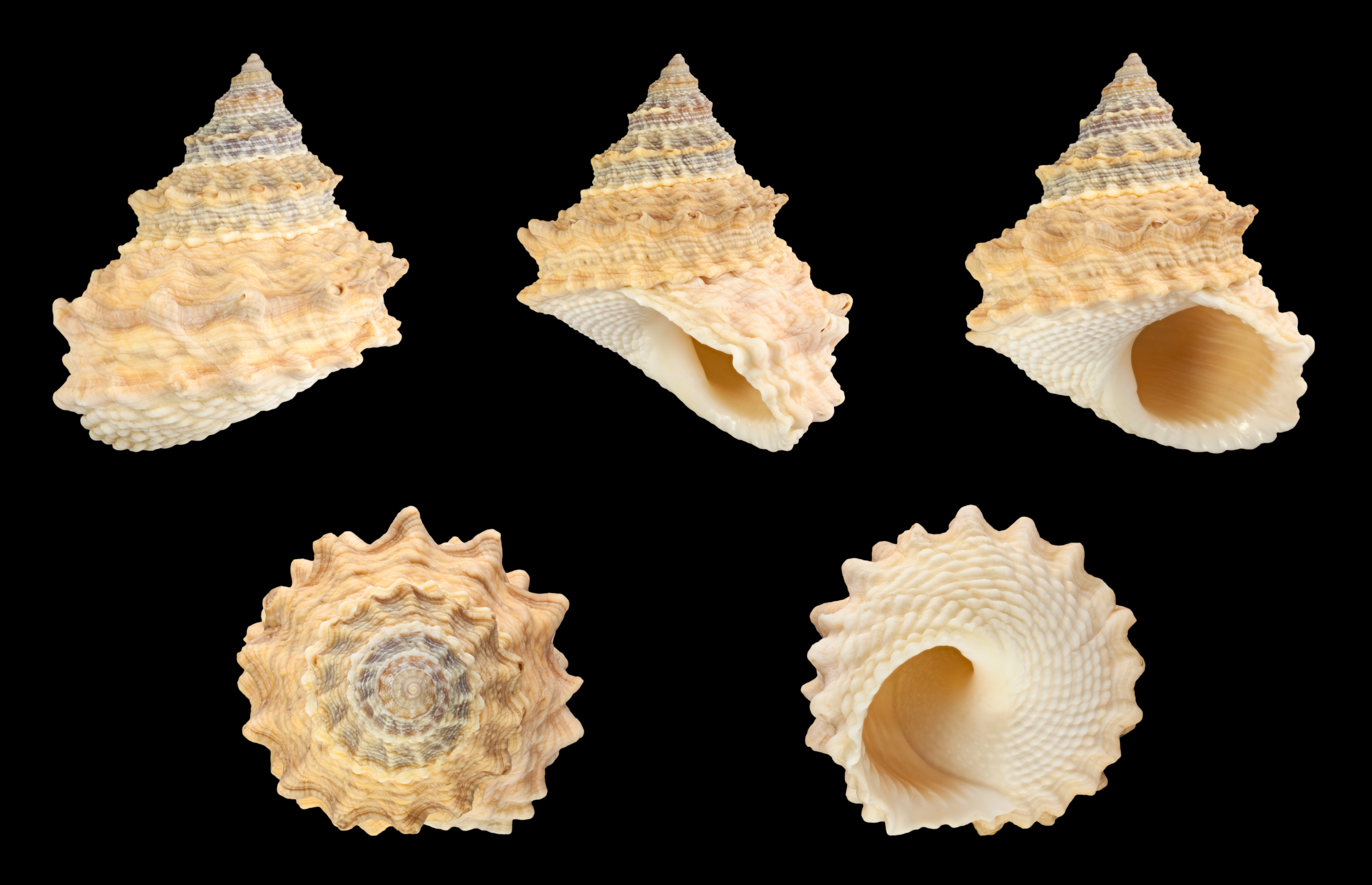
- A shell of Tectarius pagodus

Scientific classification
- Kingdom: Animalia
- Phylum: Mollusca
- Class: Gastropoda
- Subclass: Caenogastropoda
- Order: Littorinimorpha
- Family: Littorinidae
- Genus: Tectarius
- Species: T. pagodus

Binomial name
- Tectarius pagodus (Linnaeus, 1758)

Synonyms
- Trochus pagodus Linnaeus, 1758

= Tectarius pagodus =

Species of gastropod

Tectarius pagodus is a species of sea snail, a marine gastropod mollusk in the family Littorinidae. That family is commonly known as the winkles or periwinkles.

== Description ==
This species is the largest member of the genus Tectarius, and (like the rest of the family Littorinidae) is an herbivor.

== Distribution ==
This species is endemic to the Indo-Pacific. It can be found in the upper part of the intertidal zone along rocky shores, and therefore does not often get submerged.
