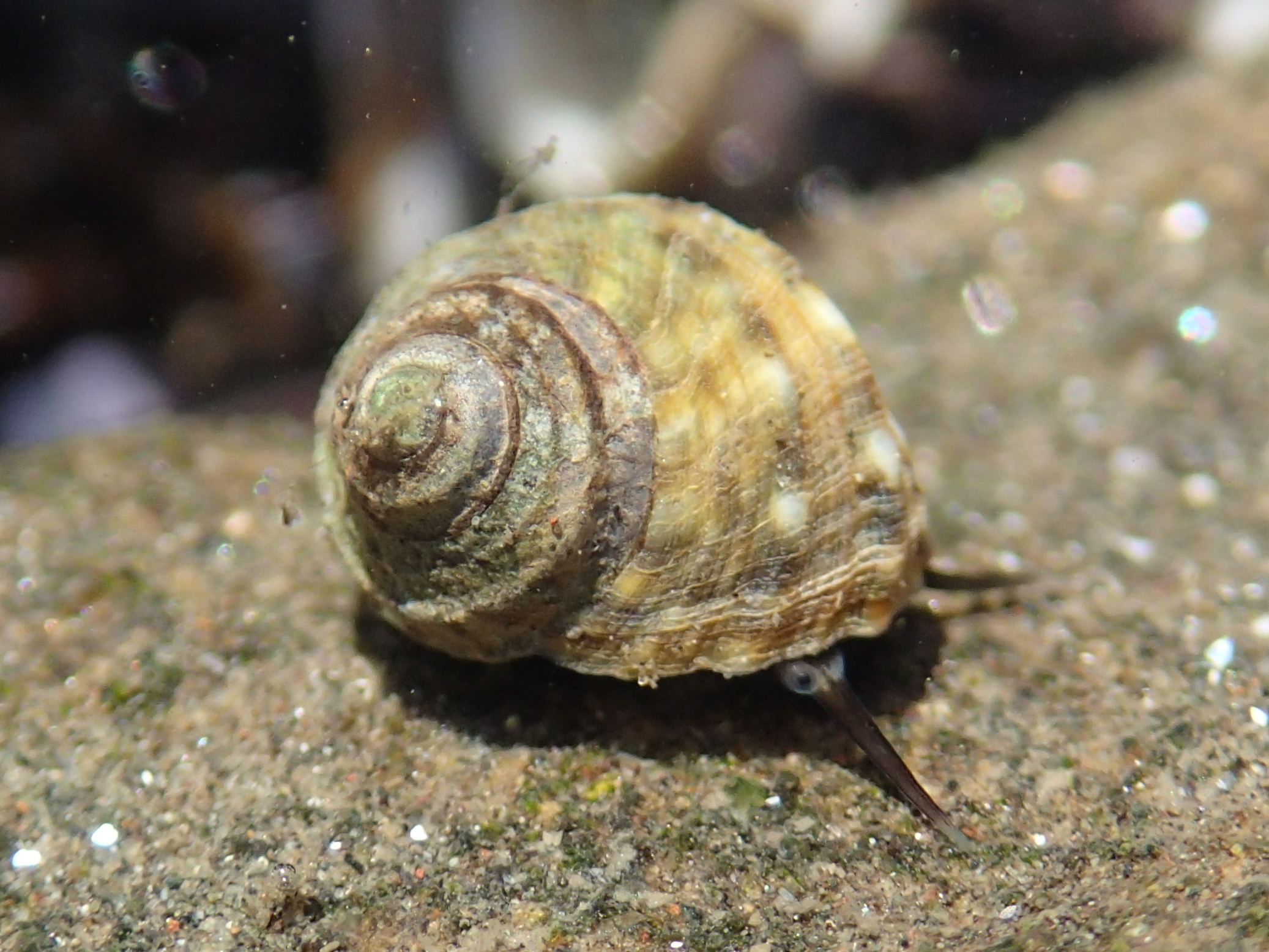

Scientific classification
- Kingdom: Animalia
- Phylum: Mollusca
- Class: Gastropoda
- Subclass: Caenogastropoda
- Order: Littorinimorpha
- Family: Littorinidae
- Genus: Littorina
- Species: L. brevicula

Binomial name
- Littorina brevicula (Philippi, 1844)

Synonyms
- Leptothyra sakaensis Yokoyama, 1925; Litorina brevicula (Philippi, 1844); Litorina brevicula f. depressior Schrenk, 1867; Litorina brevicula f. eliator Schrenk, 1867; Litorina brevicula var. costulata Schrenk, 1867; Litorina brevicula var. laevigata Schrenk, 1867; Littorina balteata Reeve, 1857; Littorina heterospiralis Grabau & King, 1928; Littorina itelmenica Sinelnikova in Gladenkov & Sinelnikova, 1990; Littorina souverbiana Crosse, 1862; Turbo breviculus Philippi, 1847

= Littorina brevicula =

Species of gastropod

Littorina brevicula is a species of sea snail, a marine gastropod mollusk in the family Littorinidae, the winkles or periwinkles.
