= Littorina aleutica =

Scientific classification
- Kingdom: Animalia
- Phylum: Mollusca
- Class: Gastropoda
- Subclass: Caenogastropoda
- Order: Littorinimorpha
- Family: Littorinidae
- Genus: Littorina
- Species: L. aleutica

Binomial name
- Littorina aleutica Dall, 1872

Species of gastropod

Littorina aleutica is a species of sea snail, a marine gastropod mollusk in the family Littorinidae, the winkles or periwinkles.

== Distribution ==
Locality: Aleutian Islands, Fox Islands, Akutan Pass, Alaska, United States, North Pacific Ocean
