= Littorina islandica =

Scientific classification
- Kingdom: Animalia
- Phylum: Mollusca
- Class: Gastropoda
- Subclass: Caenogastropoda
- Order: Littorinimorpha
- Family: Littorinidae
- Genus: Littorina
- Species: L. islandica

Binomial name
- Littorina islandica Reid, 1996

Extinct species of gastropod

Littorina islandica is an extinct species of sea snail, a marine gastropod mollusk in the family Littorinidae, the winkles or periwinkles.
