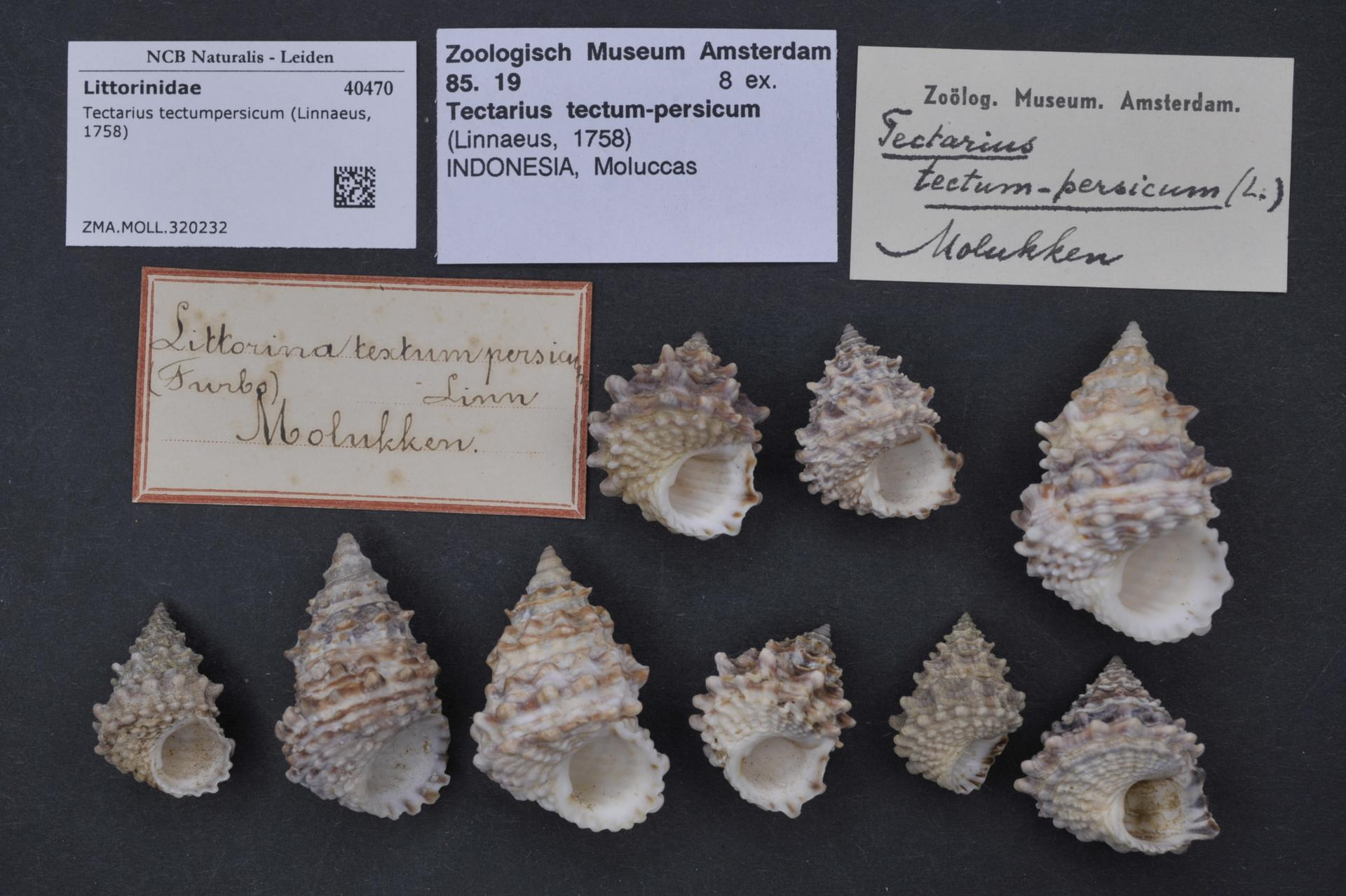

Scientific classification
- Kingdom: Animalia
- Phylum: Mollusca
- Class: Gastropoda
- Subclass: Caenogastropoda
- Order: Littorinimorpha
- Family: Littorinidae
- Genus: Tectarius
- Species: T. tectumpersicum

Binomial name
- Tectarius tectumpersicum (Linnaeus, 1758)

= Tectarius tectumpersicum =

Species of gastropod

Tectarius tectumpersicum is a species of sea snail, a marine gastropod mollusk in the family Littorinidae, the winkles or periwinkles.
