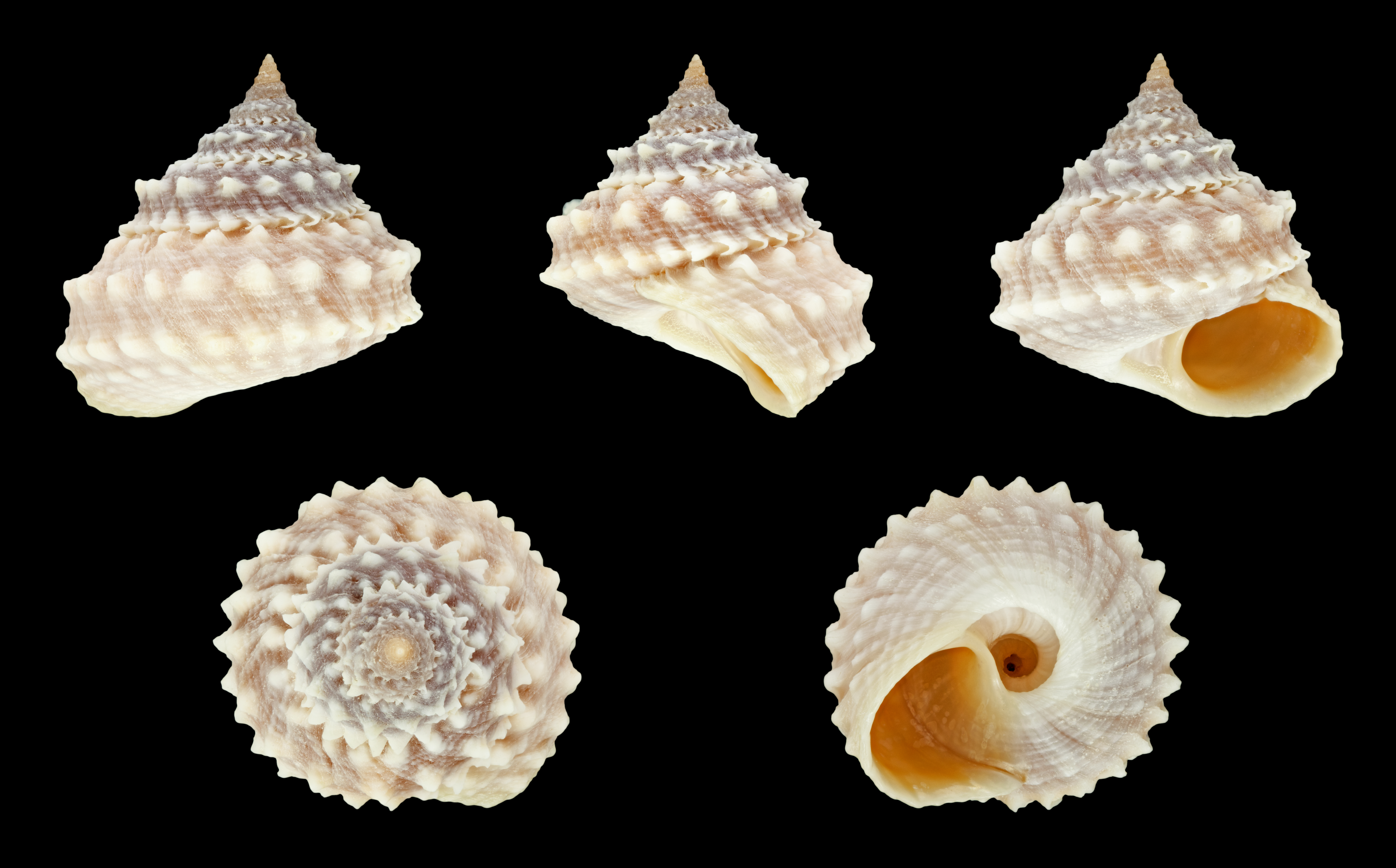

Scientific classification
- Kingdom: Animalia
- Phylum: Mollusca
- Class: Gastropoda
- Subclass: Caenogastropoda
- Order: Littorinimorpha
- Family: Littorinidae
- Genus: Tectarius
- Species: T. cumingii

Binomial name
- Tectarius cumingii (Philippi, 1846)

= Tectarius cumingii =

Species of gastropod

Tectarius cumingii is a species of sea snail, a marine gastropod mollusc in the family Littorinidae, the winkles or periwinkles.
