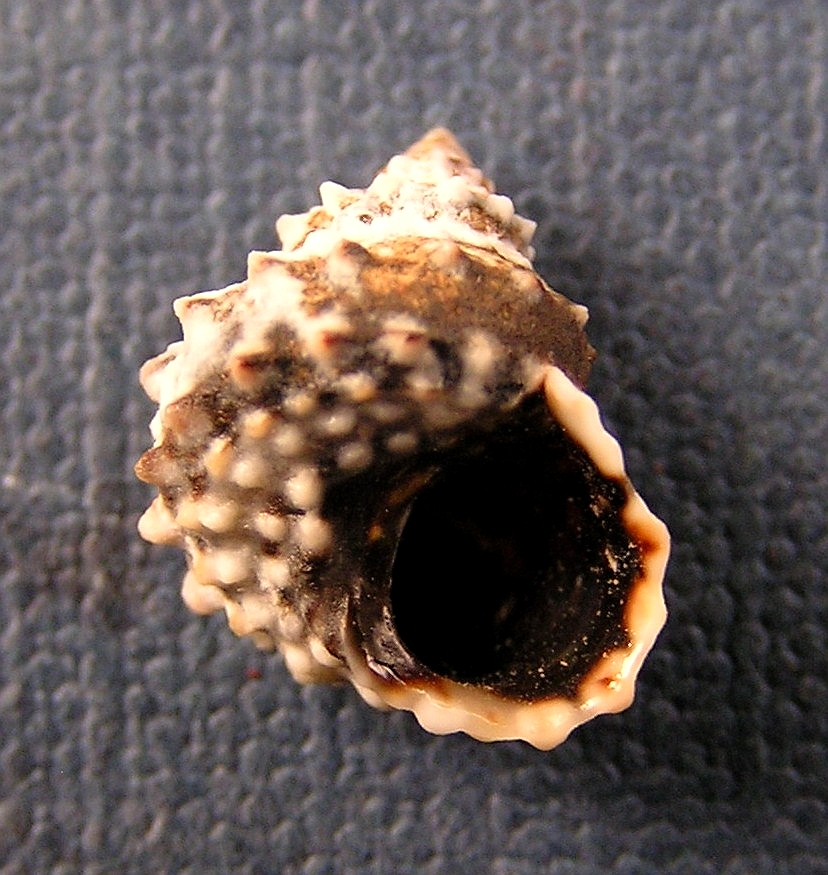
- Cenchritis nodulosus

Scientific classification
- Kingdom: Animalia
- Phylum: Mollusca
- Class: Gastropoda
- Subclass: Caenogastropoda
- Order: Littorinimorpha
- Family: Littorinidae
- Genus: Cenchritis; Martens, 1900

= Cenchritis =

Genus of gastropods

Cenchritis is a genus of sea snails, marine gastropod mollusks in the family Littorinidae, the winkles or periwinkles.

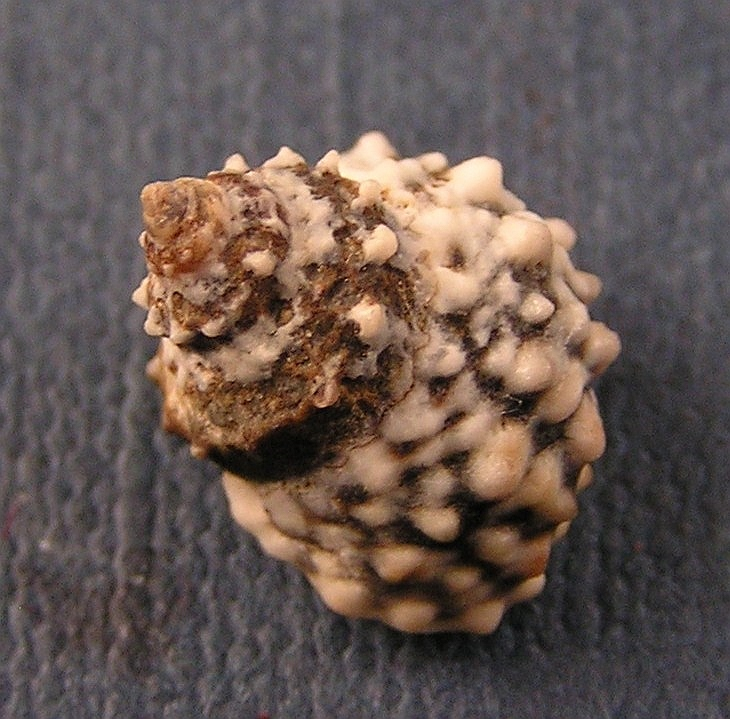
Cenchritis nodulosus, apical view

== Species ==
Species within the genus Cenchritis include:

- Cenchritis antonii (Philippi, R.A., 1846)
- Cenchritis coronatus Valenciennes, A., 1832
- Cenchritis cumingii
  - Cenchritis cumingii cumingii (Philippi, R.A., 1846)
  - Cenchritis cumingii luchuanus (Pilsbry, H.A., 1901)
  - Cenchritis cumingii spinulosus (Philippi, R.A., 1847)
- Cenchritis granosus (Philippi, R.A., 1846)
- Cenchritis malaccanus (Philippi, R.A.)
- Cenchritis muricatus (Linnaeus, 1758)
- Cenchritis niuensis (Reid, D.G. & Geller, 1997)
- Cenchritis nodulosus Pfeiffer, L., 1839
- Cenchritis pagodus (Linnaeus, C., 1758)
- Cenchritis rugosus Wood, W., 1828
- Cenchritis rusticus (Philippi, R.A., 1846)
- Cenchritis tectumpersicum (Linnaeus, C., 1758)
- Cenchritis viviparus (Rosewater, J., 1982)

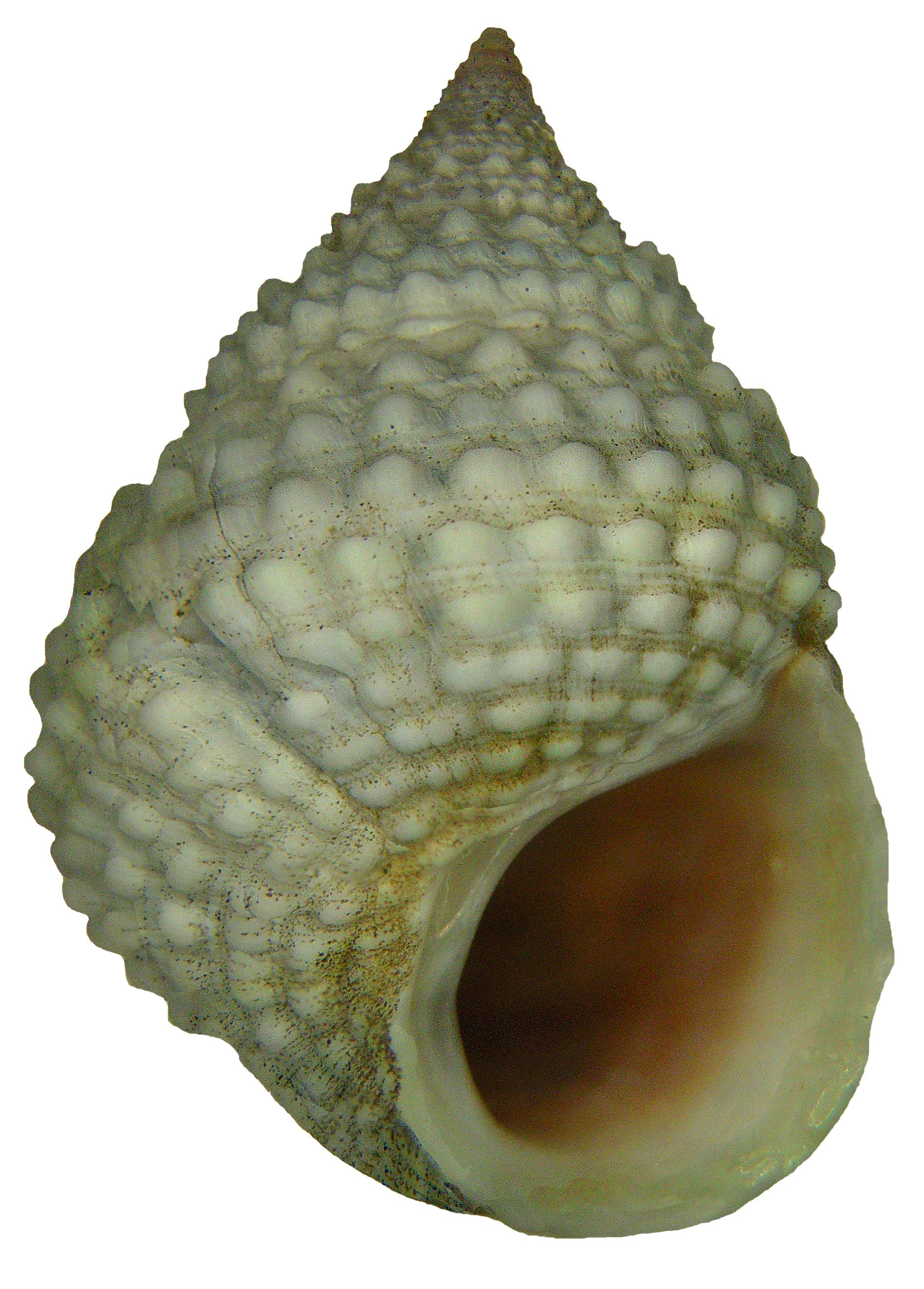
Apertural view of Cenchritis muricatus
