= Tectarius niuensis =

Scientific classification
- Kingdom: Animalia
- Phylum: Mollusca
- Class: Gastropoda
- Subclass: Caenogastropoda
- Order: Littorinimorpha
- Family: Littorinidae
- Genus: Tectarius
- Species: T. niuensis

Binomial name
- Tectarius niuensis Reid & Geller, 1997

Synonyms
- Tectarius (Echininiopsis) niuensis D.G. Reid & Geller, 1997

Species of gastropod

Tectarius niuensis is a species of sea snail, a marine gastropod mollusc in the family Littorinidae, the winkles or periwinkles.
