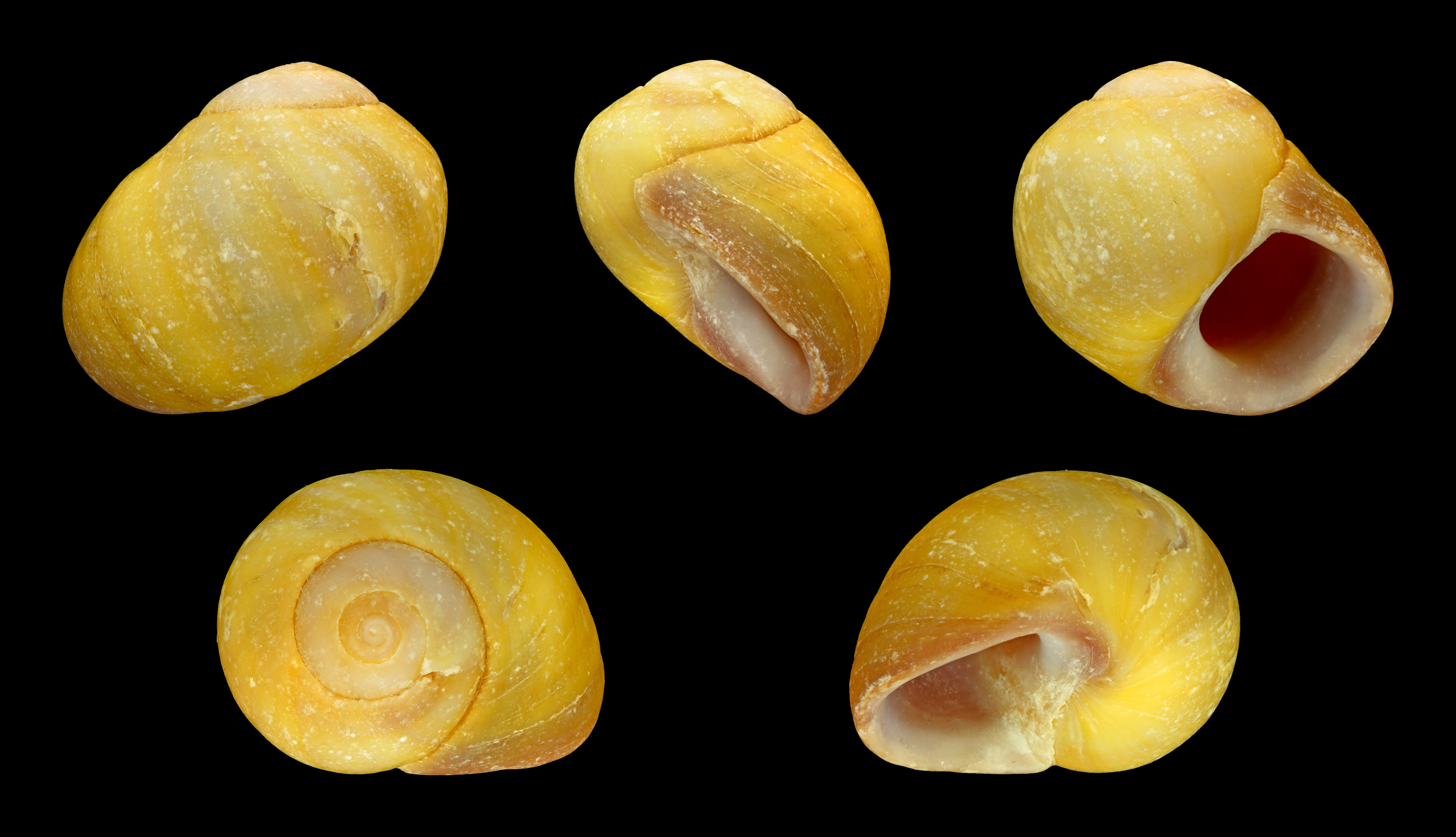
- Littorina obtusata

Scientific classification
- Kingdom: Animalia
- Phylum: Mollusca
- Class: Gastropoda
- Subclass: Caenogastropoda
- Order: Littorinimorpha
- Family: Littorinidae
- Genus: Littorina
- Species: L. obtusata

Binomial name
- Littorina obtusata (Linnaeus, 1758)

Synonyms
- Litorina arctica Møller, 1842; Litorina ioides Menke, 1845; Litorina obtusata (Linnaeus, 1758); Litorina obtusata var. fasciata Menke, 1845; Litorina obtusata var. unicolor Menke, 1845; Litorina obtusata var. zonata Menke, 1845; Littorelaea pultneyii Leach in Gray, 1847; Littorina arctica (Møller, 1842); Littorina arctica var. angulata M. Sars, 1851; Littorina arctica var. eliator M. Sars, 1851; Littorina groenlandica var. laevior Mørch, 1857; Littorina obtusata f. elatiorangulata Middendorff, 1849; Littorina obtusata f. globosa Middendorff, 1849; Littorina obtusata f. magnei Sacchi, 1961; Littorina obtusata f. torquata Sacchi, 1963; Littorina obtusata littoralis var. albescens Dautzenberg & P. Fisher, 1925; Littorina obtusata littoralis var. alternata Dautzenberg & P. Fisher, 1915; Littorina obtusata littoralis var. fusca Dautzenberg & P. Fisher, 1915; Littorina obtusata littoralis var. inversicolor Dautzenberg & P. Fisher, 1915; Littorina obtusata littoralis var. olivacea Dautzenberg & P. Fisher, 1915; Littorina obtusata littoralis var. rhabdota Dautzenberg & P. Fisher, 1915; Littorina obtusata littoralis var. rubens Dautzenberg & P. Fisher, 1915; Littorina obtusata lutea Dautzenberg & P. Fisher, 1915; Littorina obtusata var. aestuarii Jeffreys, 1869; Littorina obtusata var. albida Schlesch, 1930; Littorina obtusata var. ambigua Dautzenberg & P. Fisher, 1915; Littorina obtusata var. aurantia Dautzenberg, 1893; Littorina obtusata var. balteata Dautzenberg & P. Fisher, 1915; Littorina obtusata var. castanea Dautzenberg & P. Fisher, 1915; Littorina obtusata var. citrina Dautzenberg, 1893; Littorina obtusata var. lineolata Dautzenberg & P. Fisher, 1915; Littorina obtusata var. orana Norman, 1888; Littorina obtusata var. ornata Jeffreys, 1865; Littorina obtusata var. pulchra Schlesch, 1930; Littorina obtusata var. tessellata Dautzenberg & P. Fisher, 1915; Littorina obtusata var. virescens Schlesch, 1930; Littorina palliata Say, 1821; Littorina palliata var. auricularia Schlesch, 1916; Littorina palliata var. carinata Schlesch, 1916; Littorina preconica S. Smith, 1860; Littorina tenebrosa f. elatiorcrassa Middendorff, 1849; Littorina tenebrosa var. obtusataea Middendorff, 1849; Nerita litoralis Turton, 1819; Turbo neritiformis Brown, 1827; Turbo obtusatus Linnaeus, 1758; Turbo palliatus Say, 1822; Turbo retusus Lamarck, 1822

= Littorina obtusata =

Species of gastropod

Littorina obtusata, common name the flat periwinkle, is a species of sea snail, a marine gastropod mollusk in the family Littorinidae, the winkles or periwinkles.

== Description ==
Littorina obtusata, flat periwinkles, are sea snails. They grow to 1.5 cm in height. They can be brown, yellow, olive green, and black. They are mostly found in the colors of brown, reddish brown, or yellow, with few being red or white because of the abundance of brown seaweed. L. obtusata have the name flat periwinkle because they have a flattened spire and a large teardrop-shaped aperture. The last whorl of the shell makes up 90% of their height. The maximum recorded shell length is 13.5 mm. The operculum is yellowish to brown. This species is mainly littoral, but also has gill respiration. This means that they can survive both in water, and extended amounts of time on land.

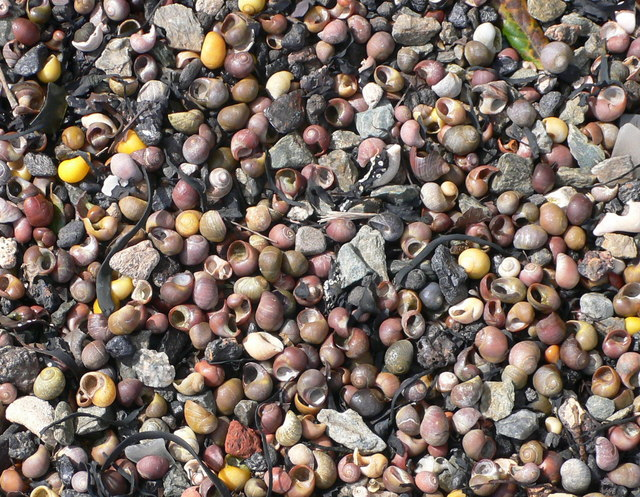
L. obtusata: various shell colours

== Distribution ==
This marine species occurs wherever brown seaweeds grow. It is widely distributed: the Baltic Sea, in European waters from Norway down to Southern Spain, in the Mediterranean Sea, and in the Northeast Atlantic Ocean along the Gulf of Maine.

== Scientific background ==
The flat periwinkle is not highly studied, so not much is known about them. Despite this, there have been recent developments in research on them, such as the following: It has been suspected that the Littorina obtusata and Littorina falbalis were the same species, then diverged into two species during their evolution. Scientists were still debating when this divergence occurred. L. obtusata tends to be bigger and live longer than L. falbalis. Research suggests that L. obtusata and L. falbalis are starting to hybridize despite the strong differences in their genetics. The name of the hybridized species is L. saxatilis, but there is little information and research on it.

== Habitat ==
This species can be found in the littoral and sublittoral zone on rocky shores and piers, usually on brown algae of the genus Fucus. Its minimum recorded depth is 0 m. Its maximum recorded depth is 110 m. The habitat may define its color. On sheltered shores it has a lighter and uniform color (yellow, brown, orange or olive green). On exposed shores its color is darker and chequered. They are tolerant of low salinities and wide ranges of exposure.

== Diet ==
Littorina obtusata are herbivores that primarily eat algae. They scrape algae from surfaces using their radula, which contains thousands of tiny teeth. They are commonly associated with, and feed upon, the dominant intertidal brown algae, Ascophyllum nodosum.

== Threats ==
Littorina obtusata are very good at adapting to new areas and predators. Their largest predator is the Carcinus maenas, the green crab. As the threat of these crabs has grown, Littorina obtusata's shells have thickened to protect themselves. Wader birds also threaten Littorina obtusata's population. They forage in intertidal zones, preferring the low-water mudflats, but when they are submerged, they use the Ascophyllum/Fucus belts.

== Reproduction ==
Female Littorina obtusata deposit spawn masses on Ascophyllum nodosum, Fucus serratus, Fucus vesiculosus, and sometimes on rock surfaces. Their eggs are whitish and oval, or kidney shaped. They are encased in a mass of transparent jelly. Littorina obtusata eggs take up to four weeks to fully develop and for the snail to emerge. Sexual maturity is reached at about two years. They continue to reproduce all year round, with their maximum from spring to fall
