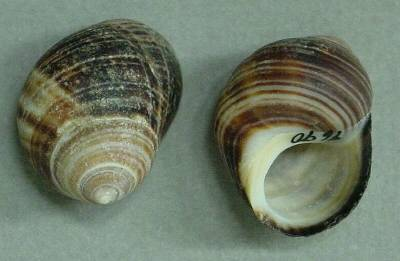
- Two shells of the Common periwinkle, Littorina littorea

Scientific classification
- Kingdom: Animalia
- Phylum: Mollusca
- Class: Gastropoda
- Subclass: Caenogastropoda
- Order: Littorinimorpha
- Family: Littorinidae
- Subfamily: Littorininae
- Genus: Littorina; Férussac, 1822

Type species
- Turbo littoreus Linnaeus, 1758

Species
- See text.

Synonyms
- Algaroda Dall, 1918; Bacalia H. Adams & A. Adams, 1854; Brevilittorina Golikov, Dolgolenko, Maximovich & Scarlato, 1990; Cricostoma Mørch, 1857; Ezolittorina Habe, 1958; Litorina Menke, 1828; Littorelaea Leach, 1847; Turbinarius Duméril, 1806

= Littorina =

Genus of gastropods

Littorina is a genus of small sea snails, marine gastropod molluscs in the family Littorinidae, the winkles or periwinkles.

These small snails live in the tidal zone of rocky shores.

== Overview ==
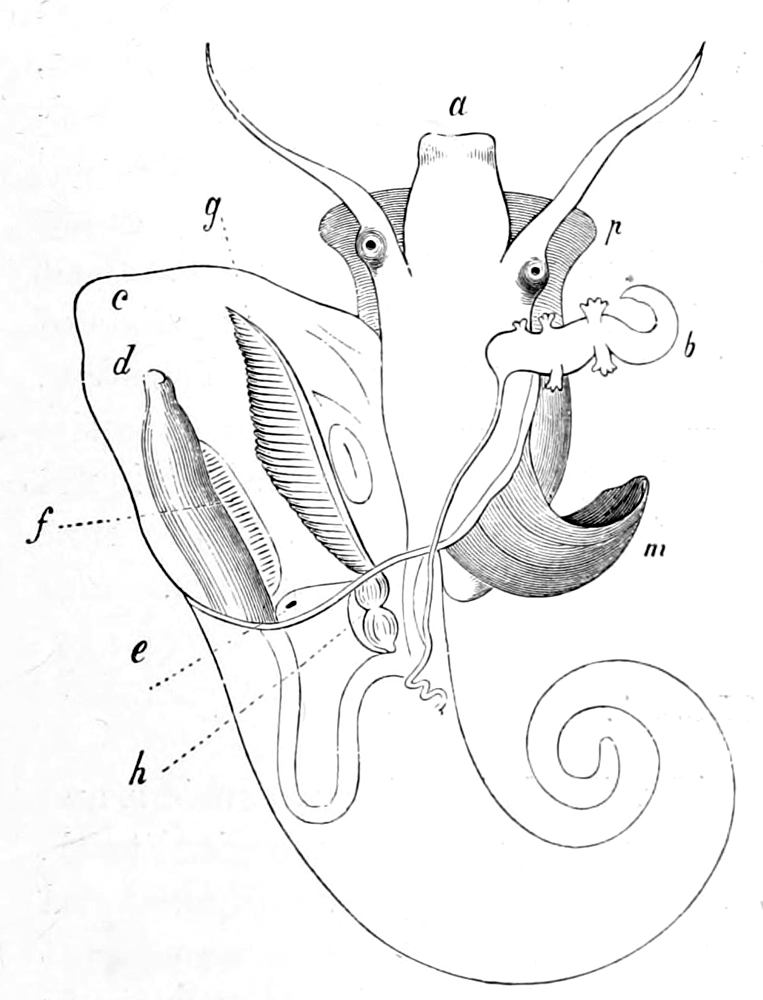
Anatomy of Littorina

In Europe there are about nine species in this genus, one of which is the rough periwinkle, Littorina saxatilis (Olivi, 1792). Another closely related (supposed) species Littorina tenebrosa (Montagu 1802) was thought to be distinct because of its different ecological requirements, but current studies have shown that it is not at all clear whether the two are indeed separate species or whether L. tenebrosa is perhaps merely an ecotype (an ecological form) of L. saxatilis.

Littorina has given its name to the Littorina Sea, the geologic precursor of the Baltic Sea.

== Distribution ==
The periwinkles are found on the seashore in the littoral zone and sublittoral zone in all parts of the world. In the Baltic they live within the influence of freshwater, and frequently become distorted in consequence.

== Description ==
The thick, pointed shell is turbinated and has few whorls. The aperture is rounded. The outer lip is acute. The columella is rather flattened and imperforate. The operculum is paucispiral. The lingual teeth are hooked and trilobed. The uncini (small teeth on the radula) are hooked and dentated.

== Species ==
The type species:Turbo littoreus Linnaeus, 1758 restricts the species in this genus to the northern hemisphere, moderate and cold zones. The tropical species belong in other genera of the same family

Species in the genus Littorina include

- Littorina aleutica Dall, 1872
- Littorina arcana Hannaford-Ellis, 1978
- Littorina brevicula (Philippi, 1844)
- Littorina compressa Jeffreys, 1865
- Littorina fabalis (Turton, 1825)
- Littorina horikawai Matsubayashi & Habe in Habe, 1979
- Littorina islandica Reid, 1996 †
- Littorina kasatka Reid, Zaslavskaya & Sergievsky, 1991
- Littorina keenae Rosewater, 1978
- Littorina littorea (Linnaeus, 1758), Common periwinkle
- Littorina mandshurica (Schrenk, 1861)
- Littorina natica Reid, 1996
- Littorina obtusata (Linnaeus, 1758), flat periwinkle
- Littorina petricola Arnold, 1908 †
- Littorina plena Gould, 1849
- Littorina remondii Gabb, 1866 †
- Littorina saxatilis (Olivi, 1792), rough periwinkle
- Littorina scutulata Gould, 1849, checkered periwinkle
- Littorina sitkana Philippi, 1846
- Littorina sookensis Clark & Arnold, 1923 †
- Littorina squalida Broderip & Sowerby, 1829
- Littorina subrotundata (Carpenter, 1864)
- Littorina varia
- Littorina zebra

Species brought into synonymy

- Littorina aestuarii Jeffreys, 1865: synonym of Littorina obtusata (Linnaeus, 1758)
- Littorina affinis d'Orbigny, 1839: synonym of Tectarius striatus (King & Broderip, 1832)
- Littorina angulifera is a synonym for Littoraria angulifera (Lamarck, 1822)
- Littorina arenica Jay, 1839: synonym of Tectarius striatus (King & Broderip, 1832)
- Litorina arenica Dunker, 1845: synonym of Tectarius striatus (King & Broderip, 1832)
- Littorina canariensis d'Orbigny, 1839: synonym of Tectarius striatus (King & Broderip, 1832)
- Littorina cingulifera R. W. Dunker, 1845: synonym of Littoraria cingulifera R. W. Dunker, 1845
- Litorina globosa Dunker, 1845: synonym of Tectarius striatus (King & Broderip, 1832)
- Littorina granularis Gray, 1839: synonym of Echinolittorina miliaris (Quoy & Gaimard, 1833)
- Littorina lamellosa Souverbie, 1861: synonym of Fossarus lamellosus (Souverbie, 1861)
- Littorina marnat Potiez & Michaud, 1838: synonym of Echinolittorina punctata (Gmelin, 1791)
- Littorina obesa (G.B. Sowerby, 1832): synonym of Littoraria coccinea (Gmelin, 1791)
- Littorina petraeus (Montagu, 1803): synonym of Melarhaphe neritoides (Linnaeus, 1758)
- Littorina planaxis G.B. Sowerby I, 1844: synonym of Tectarius striatus (King & Broderip, 1832)
- Littorina saxatilis jugosa Montagu, 1803: synonym of Littorina saxatilis (Olivi, 1792)
- Littorina saxatilis nigrolineata Gray, 1839: synonym of Littorina saxatilis (Olivi, 1792)
- Littorina striata is a synonym for Tectarius striatus (King & Broderip, 1832)
- Littorina undulata Gray, 1839: synonym of Littoraria undulata (Gray, 1839)
- Littorina unifasciata antipodum: synonym of Austrolittorina antipodum (Philippi, 1847)
- Littorina ziczac is a synonym for Echinolittorina ziczac (Gmelin, 1791)
- Littorina zonaria Bean, 1844: synonym of Littorina saxatilis (Olivi, 1792)
