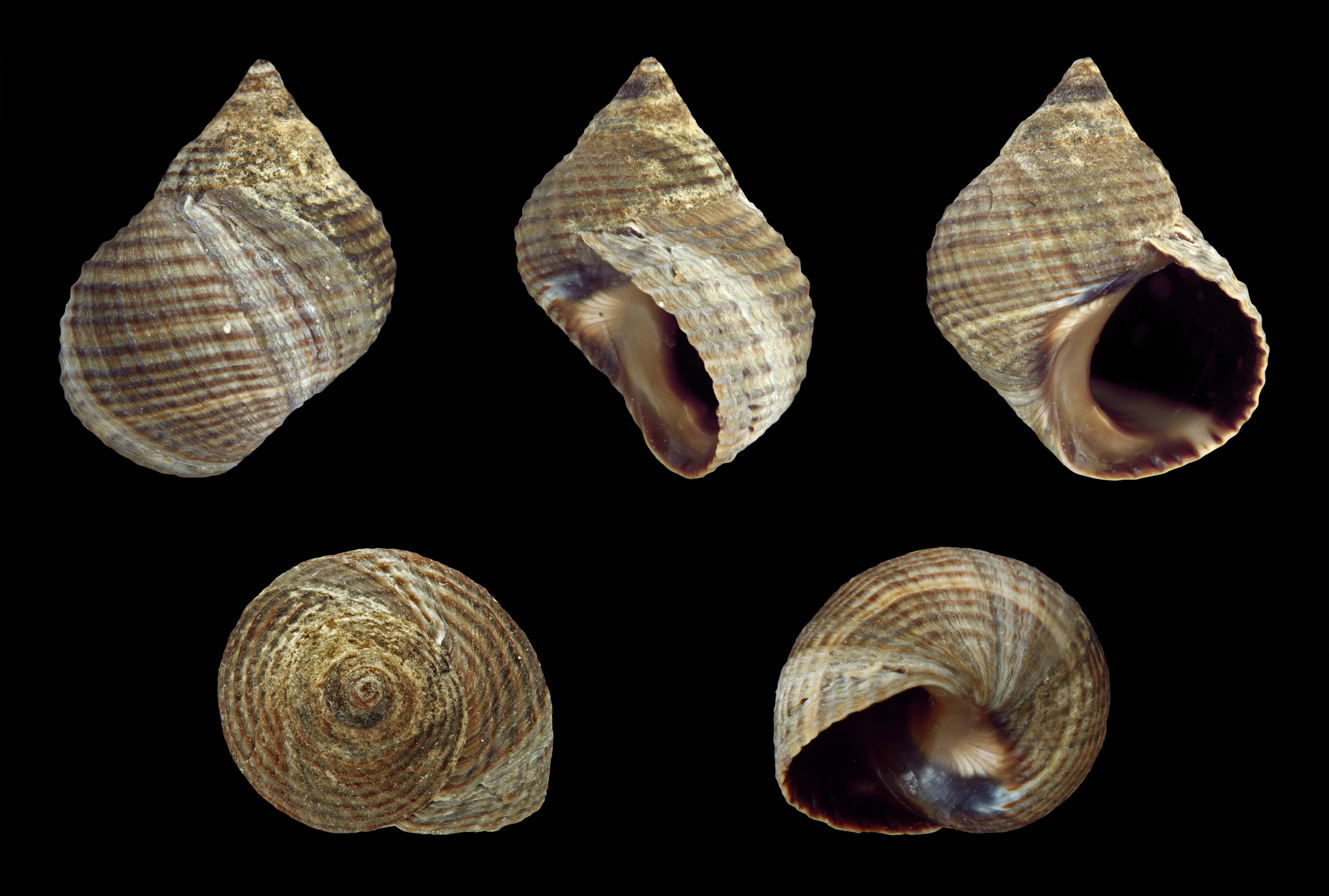

Scientific classification
- Kingdom: Animalia
- Phylum: Mollusca
- Class: Gastropoda
- Subclass: Caenogastropoda
- Order: Littorinimorpha
- Family: Littorinidae
- Genus: Tectarius
- Species: T. striatus

Binomial name
- Tectarius striatus (King & Broderip, 1832)

Synonyms
- Littorina striata King & Broderip, 1832

= Tectarius striatus =

Species of gastropod

Tectarius striatus is a species of sea snail, a marine gastropod mollusk in the family Littorinidae, the winkles or periwinkles. It is endemic to Macaronesia (Azores, Madeira, Savage Islands, Canary Islands and Cape Verde).
