= Littorina arcana =

Scientific classification
- Kingdom: Animalia
- Phylum: Mollusca
- Class: Gastropoda
- Subclass: Caenogastropoda
- Order: Littorinimorpha
- Family: Littorinidae
- Genus: Littorina
- Species: L. arcana

Binomial name
- Littorina arcana Hannaford-Ellis, 1978

Synonyms
- Littorina saxatilis patula Thorpe, 1844; Littorina saxatilis patula var. attenuata Dautzenberg & P. Fisher, 1912

Species of gastropod

Littorina arcana is a species of sea snail, a marine gastropod mollusk in the family Littorinidae, the winkles or periwinkles.

Littorina arcana has a shell largely indistinguishable from Littorina saxatilis. It breeds by laying egg masses, whereas L. saxatilis produces crawl-away young, so the animals can be distinguished by dissection only.
