= Laurel Johannesson =

Canadian artist

Laurel Johannesson is a Canadian artist who studied at the University of Calgary in Alberta (MFA, 1999), the University of Saskatchewan (BFA, 1993 and BA, 1991), and the Royal College of Art in London, England. With degree specializations in printmaking, digital media, drawing and painting and a background in photography and video, her work often crosses the boundaries between all of these areas. She uses her artwork to examine suspended temporality.

In 2005, Laurel was an invited Artist in Residence at the Association of Icelandic Visual Artists in Reykjavík, Iceland as well as the Skopelos Foundation for the Arts in Skopelos, Greece. In June 2006, she returned to Greece where she was Artist in Residence at the Apothiki Art Centre on the island of Paros, where her work was also exhibited in a solo exhibition in July 2007. In addition, she was an invited Fellow at the Bau Institute in Italy in 2007 and in 2008 in the Côte d’Azur where she was once again Artist in Residence. Most recently she has been a Visiting Artist at the American Academy in Rome. Upcoming projects for 2010 include a solo exhibition in Venice, Italy.

Johannesson has exhibited her work extensively in Canada, including at the Herringer Kiss Gallery, as well as internationally including countries such as Greece, Italy, England, France, India, Iceland, Argentina, Germany, Japan, Chile, and the United States. She has been the recipient of numerous awards and her work is included in many prestigious public, private, and corporate collections.

Laurel Johannesson is currently Assistant Dean at the Alberta College of Art and Design and is working on a PhD at the University of Calgary.
