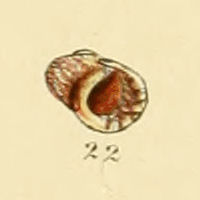

Scientific classification
- Kingdom: Animalia
- Phylum: Mollusca
- Class: Gastropoda
- Subclass: Caenogastropoda
- Order: Littorinimorpha
- Family: Littorinidae
- Genus: Littorina
- Species: L. fabalis

Binomial name
- Littorina fabalis (Turton, 1825)

Synonyms
- Litorina arctica var. retusa Møller, 1842; Litorina limata Lovén, 1846; Litorina vittata Philippi, 1848; Littorina beanii MacGillivray, 1843; Littorina bizonalis Récluz, 1869; Littorina fabula Kobelt, 1907; Littorina mariae Sacchi & Rastelli, 1966; Littorina mariae beeensis S.M. Smith in Fretter & Graham, 1980; Littorina obtusata littoralis var. inversicolorreticulata Dautzenberg & P. Fisher, 1915; Littorina obtusata littoralis var. minima Dautzenberg & P. Fisher, 1915; Littorina obtusata littoralis var. pachychila Dautzenberg & P. Fisher, 1915; Littorina obtusata littoralis var. reticulata Dautzenberg & P. Fisher, 1915; Littorina obtusata littoralis var. ziczac Dautzenberg & P. Fisher, 1915; Littorina vadorum Sacchi, 1954; Turbo expansus Brown in J. Smith, 1839; Turbo fabalis Turton, 1825

= Littorina fabalis =

Species of gastropod

Littorina fabalis is a species of sea snail, a marine gastropod mollusk in the family Littorinidae, the winkles or periwinkles.

== Description ==
The maximum recorded shell length is 1.8 cm. L. fabalis can be dark or light green, yellow, orange, brown or black. The lighter colours are more frequently found on sheltered shores, and the brown morph on exposed shores.

== Distribution ==
L. fabalis is distributed on British, Irish, and North Sea coasts, and southwards into the western Mediterranean.

== Habitat ==
This species can be found on seaweeds like Fucus vesiculosus and Ascophyllum nodosum. The minimum recorded depth for this species is 0 m; maximum recorded depth is 0 m.
