= Littorina subrotundata =

Conservation status
- Secure (NatureServe)

Scientific classification
- Kingdom: Animalia
- Phylum: Mollusca
- Class: Gastropoda
- Subclass: Caenogastropoda
- Order: Littorinimorpha
- Family: Littorinidae
- Genus: Littorina
- Species: L. subrotundata

Binomial name
- Littorina subrotundata (Carpenter, 1864)

Synonyms
- Assiminea subrotundata Carpenter, 1864; Algamorda subrotundata (Carpenter, 1864); Littorina (Neritrema) subrotundata (Carpenter, 1864); Littorina subrotundata kurila Boulding, 1990; Paludinella newcombiana Hemphill, 1877

Species of gastropod

Littorina subrotundata, commonly known as the Newcomb periwinkle or Newcomb's littorine snail, is a species of sea snail, a marine gastropod mollusk in the family Littorinidae, the winkles or periwinkles.
