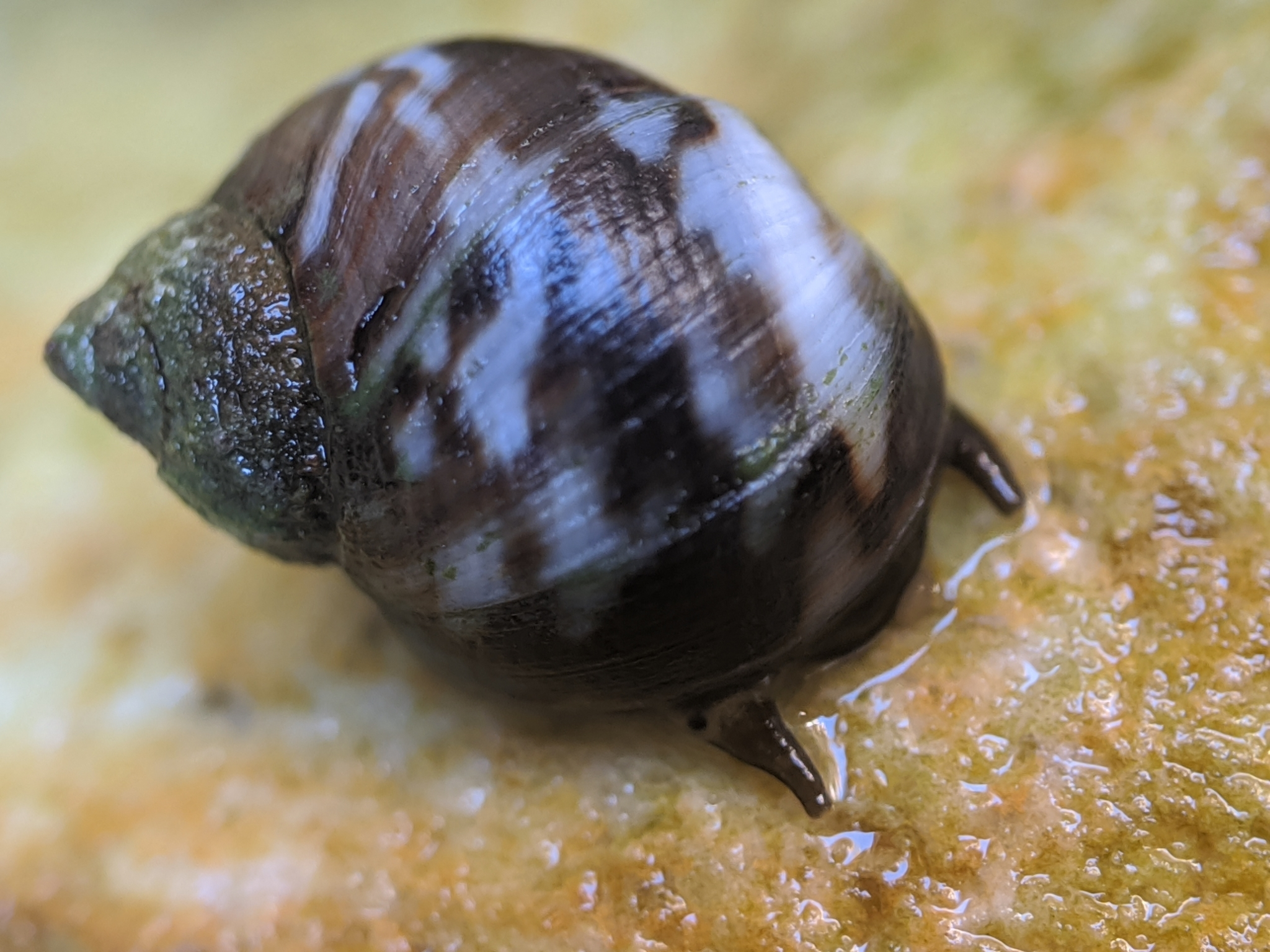

Scientific classification
- Kingdom: Animalia
- Phylum: Mollusca
- Class: Gastropoda
- Subclass: Caenogastropoda
- Order: Littorinimorpha
- Family: Littorinidae
- Genus: Littorina
- Species: L. keenae

Binomial name
- Littorina keenae Rosewater, 1978

Synonyms
- Litorina planaxis R. A. Philippi, 1847; Littorina patula Gould, 1849; Littorina planaxis Jay, 1839; Littorina planaxis Philippi, 1847

= Littorina keenae =

Species of gastropod

turning over

Littorina keenae, the eroded periwinkle, is a species of sea snail in the family Littorinidae, the winkles or periwinkles. This species can be found in western North America along coastal waters of the Pacific Ocean, with a primary range extending from Coos County (Oregon) to La Paz (Baja California Sur). These snails inhabit intertidal and splash zones along rocky coastlines. This species grows up to 2 centimeters in length, with a shell with 2 whorls with an eroded tip. Colorations include purplish brown with faint white markings, and a white band on the edge of the mouth of the shell. The diet consists of algae and diatoms that the snail feeds on by scraping off of rocks through the use of their radula. This behavior is also capable of slowly eroding the rocks these snails feed off of, deepening high tide pools by 1.25 centimeters every year with high enough activity. When individuals are caught outside of water they are capable of drawing into their shells, closing their operculum to keep their gills moist with trapped water. The snails also produce a mucus that sticks their shells to rocks. Through these adaptations, this species is capable of surviving out of water for up to 3 months during dry periods. This also allows them to temporarily survive in freshwater pools of water for several days.
