= Karen H. Johannesson =

American geochemist

- Born: New Hampshire
- Education: B.S in geology from University of New Hampshire; M.S in geology from Boston College; PhD in hydrology and hydrogeology from University of Nevada, Reno
- Occupations: Professor of geochemistry, School for the Environment, and director of the Environmental Analytical Facility at University of Massachusetts Boston
- Awards: Geochemical Society's Clair C. Patterson medal (2015)

Karen H. Johannesson is an American geochemist and professor in the School for the Environment at the University of Massachusetts Boston and the Intercampus Marine Sciences Graduate Program of the University of Massachusetts System. She teaches geochemistry and has expertise in environmental geochemistry, biogeochemistry, trace element speciation, geochemical modeling, chemical hydrogeology, reaction path and reactive transport modeling.

== Biography ==
Johannesson was born and raised in the Contoocook Valley region of New Hampshire. She received her Bachelor of Science in geology at the University of New Hampshire in 1985. Johannesson then went on to receive a master's degree in 1988 from Boston College in geology and geophysics. She then received her doctorate in hydrology and hydrogeology from the University of Nevada Reno. Johannesson has worked for four universities since receiving her PhD. She worked as an assistant professor at Old Dominion University from 1998 to 2002. After this, she worked as a professor for five years at the University of Texas at Arlington. Her longest position as a professor was at Tulane University as a Cochran Family Professor of Geochemistry and Chemical Hydrogeology, where her laboratory focused on elevated arsenic levels in the groundwater of Ganges Brahmaputra delta and fluxes of trace elements to coastal ocean through groundwater. Currently Johannesson works as a professor of geochemistry at the University of Massachusetts Boston in the School for the Environment. Her research focuses on the chemical speciation and biogeochemical cycling of trace elements in the environment.

Johannesson is the author of the book Rare Earth Elements in Groundwater Flow Systems which focuses on the geochemistry of the lanthanide series elements in groundwater environments. It was first published in 2005.

Since 2016 Johannesson has served as Co-Editor-in-Chief of the journal Chemical Geology. She has also served as an associate editor for the journal Geochimica et Cosmochimica Acta since 2005 and was an associate editor for American Mineralogist from 2014 until 2017.

== Awards and honors ==
In 2015, Johannesson was awarded the Geochemical Society's Clair C. Patterson medal for her research in environmental geochemistry. She became a Fellow of the Geological Society of America in 2010, the International Association of Geochemistry in 2014, and the Geochemical Society as well as the European Association of Geochemistry in 2015.

== Publications ==
Some of the more recent work that Johannesson is involved with consists of research on chemicals found in groundwater. An article she had participated in was "Chlorine-salinity as indicator of the chemical composition of groundwater: empirical predictive model based on aquifers in Southern Quebec, Canada". The research aimed to categorize the 12 chemical elements discovered in the groundwater at the location in order to create correlations between the chemicals to salinity levels. Her contribution to environmental studies has resulted in 173 current publications thus far.
