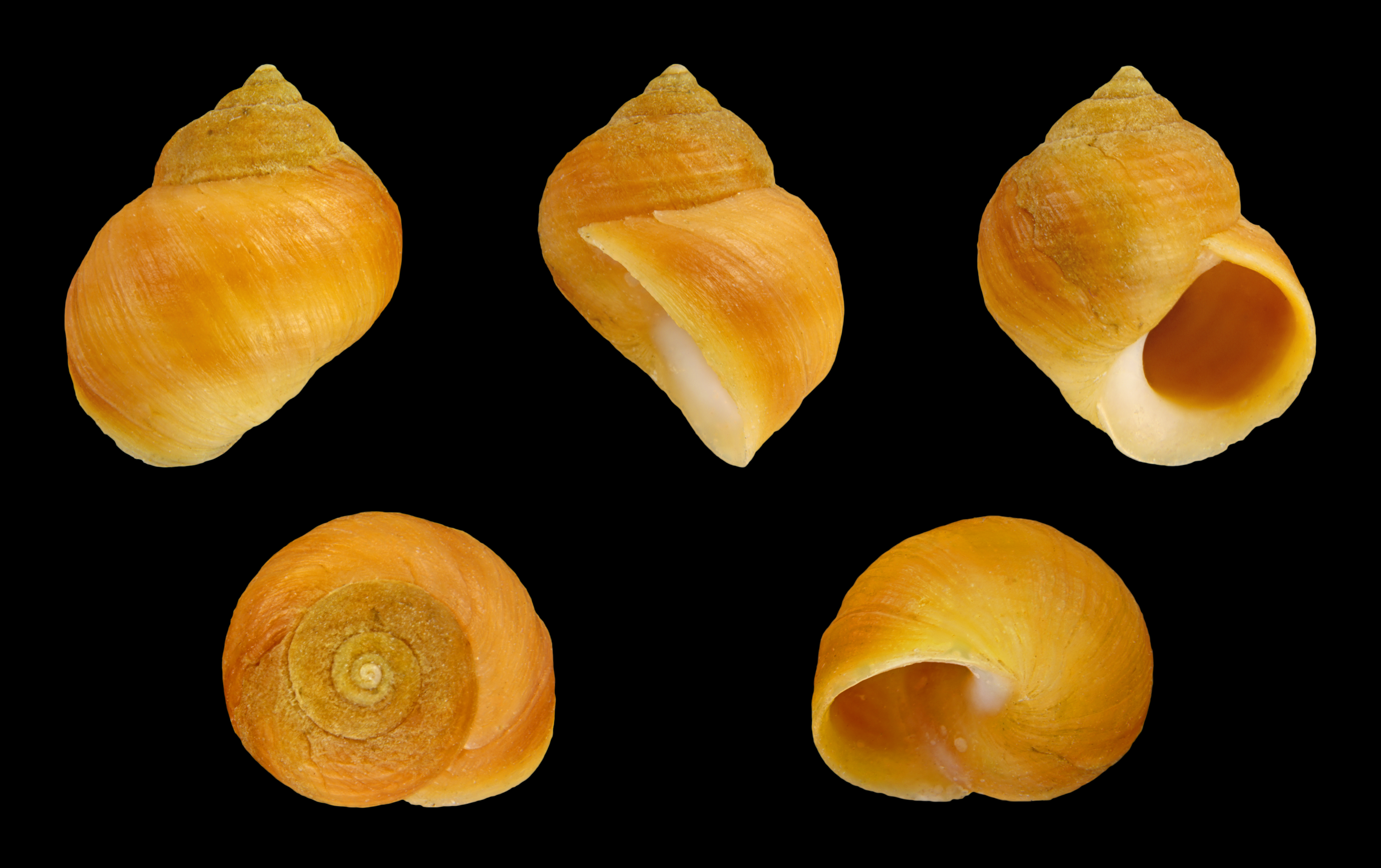
- A shell of Littorina saxatilis

Scientific classification
- Kingdom: Animalia
- Phylum: Mollusca
- Class: Gastropoda
- Subclass: Caenogastropoda
- Order: Littorinimorpha
- Family: Littorinidae
- Genus: Littorina
- Species: L. saxatilis

Binomial name
- Littorina saxatilis (Olivi, 1792)

Synonyms
- Turbo saxatilis Olivi, 1792 (basionym)

= Littorina saxatilis =

Rough periwinkle

Species of gastropod

Littorina saxatilis, common name the rough periwinkle, is a species of small sea snail, a marine gastropod mollusc in the family Littorinidae, the winkles or periwinkles. First identified in the 1700s, it has been misidentified as a new species 112 times.

== Distribution ==
This species is native to the shores of the North Atlantic Ocean, including Hudson Bay, Baffin Island, Greenland, and the Barents Sea, south along the American East Coast to Chesapeake Bay, and along the European coast to the Straits of Gibraltar. Only one population of this intertidal species occurred in the Mediterranean basin i.e., Venice lagoon. The Venice population represents the earliest confirmed introduction of an exotic species in the Mediterranean Sea. Abiotic environmental features such as salinity and water temperature have influenced the past and current distributions of this snail and limited its invasion of the Mediterranean Sea.

This species has also been introduced to San Francisco Bay, on the West Coast of the United States, where it was first observed in 1992.

== Shell description ==
The shell in life often appears green with algae, but the shell itself can be white, red, or brown, sometimes with checkered lines. The shell has 4–5 whorls. Maximum recorded shell length is 19 mm.

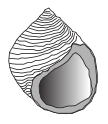
Apertural view

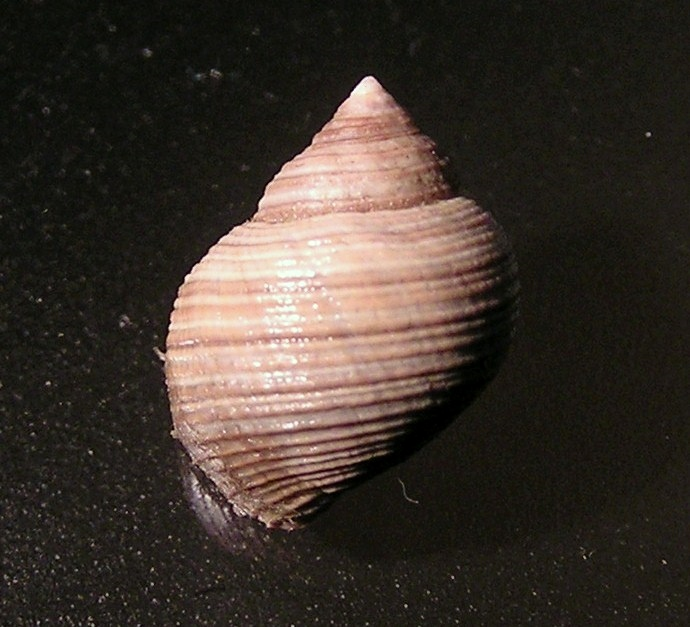
Abapertural view

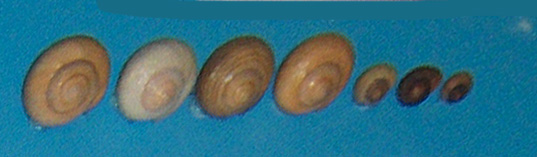
A series of shells of Littorina saxatilis

== Ecology ==
=== Habitat ===
This species frequently lives in salt marshes. it can also be found in crevices of intertidal bedrock, in empty barnacle shells, and under rocks. Like many other periwinkles, this species can survive long exposures out of the water.

The species has been recorded alive from depth range 0–46 m or up to 183 m (for shells only).

In the exposed Galician coast in the Northern Spain, two well differentiated ecotypes are adapted to different shore levels and habitats. The RB ecotype (Ridged and Banded) lives on barnacles in the upper shore. This ecotype displays a larger and more robust shell to resist the attack from predators such as crabs, and a smaller shell aperture in order to reduce the desiccation due to high sunshine exposure. The SU ecotype (Smooth and Unbanded) is found at the lower shore living on mussels. This ecotype shows a smaller and thinner shell with a wider shell aperture to allocate a relatively larger muscular foot providing a higher ability to avoid the dislodgment caused by the heavy wave action. Both ecotypes coexist in an intermediate habitat at the middle shore.

=== Genetics ===
Littorina saxatilis has been shown to be an excellent model system for speciation genetics. In the 2001 paper, Wilding and colleagues demonstrated, using amplified fragment length polymorphism, that the low shore M form of the species were divergent from the high shore H form at number of loci despite gene flow between the forms.

=== Feeding habits ===
This snail is a herbivore which grazes on the surface of rocks and mud flats.

== Life cycle ==
The marine snail Littorina saxatilis has separate sexes, internal fertilization, and a brood pouch with non-planktonic shelled embryos.

== Synonyms ==
Extended content
- Litorina groenlandica Menke, 1830
- Litorina incarnata Philippi, 1846
- Litorina marmorata L. Pfeiffer, 1839
- Litorina sulcata Menke, 1830
- Littorina castanea Deshayes in Deshayes & Milne Edwards, 1843
- Littorina danieli Locard, 1886
- Littorina groenlandica (Menke, 1830)
- Littorina neglecta Bean, 1844
- Littorina nervillei Dautzenberg, 1893
- Littorina nervillei var. major Pallary in Seurat, 1924
- Littorina nigrolineata Gray, 1839
- Littorina palliata var. turritella Schlesch, 1916
- Littorina rudis (Maton, 1797) (synonym)
- Littorina rudis f. elatior Middendorff, 1849
- Littorina rudis var. albida Dautzenberg, 1887
- Littorina rudis var. alticola Dacie, 1917
- Littorina rudis var. aurantia Dautzenberg, 1887
- Littorina rudis var. brevis Dautzenberg, 1887
- Littorina rudis var. conoidea Schlesch, 1916
- Littorina rudis var. fasciata Dautzenberg, 1887
- Littorina rudis var. finmarchia Herzenstein, 1885
- Littorina rudis var. globosa Jeffreys, 1865
- Littorina rudis var. globosa Martel, 1901
- Littorina rudis var. laevis Jeffreys, 1865
- Littorina rudis var. major Dautzenberg & P. Fisher, 1912
- Littorina rudis var. rubescens Monterosato, 1878
- Littorina rudis var. scotia S.M. Smith, 1979
- Littorina rudis var. similis Jeffreys, 1865
- Littorina rudis var. sulcata Martel, 1901
- Littorina rudis var. tenebrosapallida L.E. Adams, 1896
- Littorina rudis var. tessellata Dautzenberg, 1893
- Littorina saxatile La Roque, 1953
- Littorina saxatile saxatile La Roque, 1953
- Littorina saxatilis Johnston, 1842
- Littorina saxatilis f. abbreviata Dautzenberg & P. Fisher, 1912
- Littorina saxatilis f. conoidea Dautzenberg & P. Fisher, 1912
- Littorina saxatilis f. elongata Dautzenberg & P. Fisher, 1912
- Littorina saxatilis f. minor Dautzenberg & P. Fisher, 1912
- Littorina saxatilis groenlandica (Menke, 1830)
- Littorina saxatilis groenlandica var. sculpta Schlesch, 1931
- Littorina saxatilis jugosa Montagu, 1803
- Littorina saxatilis jugosa var. bynei Dautzenberg & P. Fisher, 1912
- Littorina saxatilis jugosa var. tenuis James, 1968
- Littorina saxatilis nigrolineata Gray, 1839
- Littorina saxatilis rudis (Maton, 1797)
- Littorina saxatilis rudis var. rudissimoides James, 1968
- Littorina saxatilis scotia Graham, 1988
- Littorina saxatilis tenebrosa (Montagu, 1803)
- Littorina saxatilis tenebrosa var. biinterrupta Fischer-Piette & Gaillard, 1963
- Littorina saxatilis tenebrosa var. bizonaria James, 1963
- Littorina saxatilis tenebrosa var. elata Dautzenberg & P. Fisher, 1912
- Littorina saxatilis tenebrosa var. maculata Fischer-Piette & Gaillard, 1963
- Littorina saxatilis var. clarilineata Fischer-Piette & Gaillard, 1971
- Littorina saxatilis var. flammulata Dautzenberg & P. Fisher, 1912
- Littorina saxatilis var. fulva Dautzenberg & P. Fisher, 1912
- Littorina saxatilis var. fusca Dautzenberg & P. Fisher, 1912
- Littorina saxatilis var. gascae Fischer-Piette & Gaillard, 1971
- Littorina saxatilis var. groenlandica (Menke, 1830)
- Littorina saxatilis var. hieroglyphica Fischer-Piette, Gaillard & Jouin, 1961
- Littorina saxatilis var. interrupta Fischer-Piette, Gaillard & Jouin, 1961
- Littorina saxatilis var. lagunae Barnes, 1993
- Littorina saxatilis var. lineata Dautzenberg & P. Fisher, 1912
- Littorina saxatilis var. lugubris Dautzenberg & P. Fisher, 1912
- Littorina saxatilis var. nigra Fischer-Piette & Gaillard, 1971
- Littorina saxatilis var. nojensis Fischer-Piette & Gaillard, 1964
- Littorina saxatilis var. rubra Fischer-Piette & Gaillard, 1971
- Littorina saxatilis var. rubrolineata Fischer-Piette, Gaillard & Delmas, 1967
- Littorina saxatilis var. salvati Fischer-Piette, Gaillard & Delmas, 1967
- Littorina saxatilis var. sanguinea Coen, 1933
- Littorina saxatilis var. sellensis Fischer-Piette & Gaillard, 1964
- Littorina saxatilis var. tractibus Fischer-Piette, Gaillard & Jouin, 1961
- Littorina saxatilis var. trifasciata Dautzenberg & P. Fisher, 1912
- Littorina saxatilis zonata Daniel, 1883
- Littorina saxoides Nardo, 1847
- Littorina simplex Reeve, 1857
- Littorina tenebrosa (Montagu, 1803)
- Littorina tenebrosa f. elatior Middendorff, 1849
- Littorina tenebrosa var. costulata Middendorff, 1849
- Littorina tenebrosa var. densecostulata Middendorff, 1849
- Littorina tenebrosa var. grisolacteus Middendorff, 1849
- Littorina tenebrosa var. intermedia Forbes & Hanley, 1850
- Littorina tenebrosa var. rubidus Middendorff, 1849
- Littorina tenebrosa var. tessellatus Middendorff, 1849
- Littorina tenebrosa var. zonatus Middendorff, 1849
- Littorina zonaria Bean, 1844
- Nerita rustica Nardo, 1847
- Turbo obligatus Say, 1822
- Turbo rudis Maton, 1797
- Turbo rudissimus Johnston, 1842

== See also ==
- Common periwinkle
