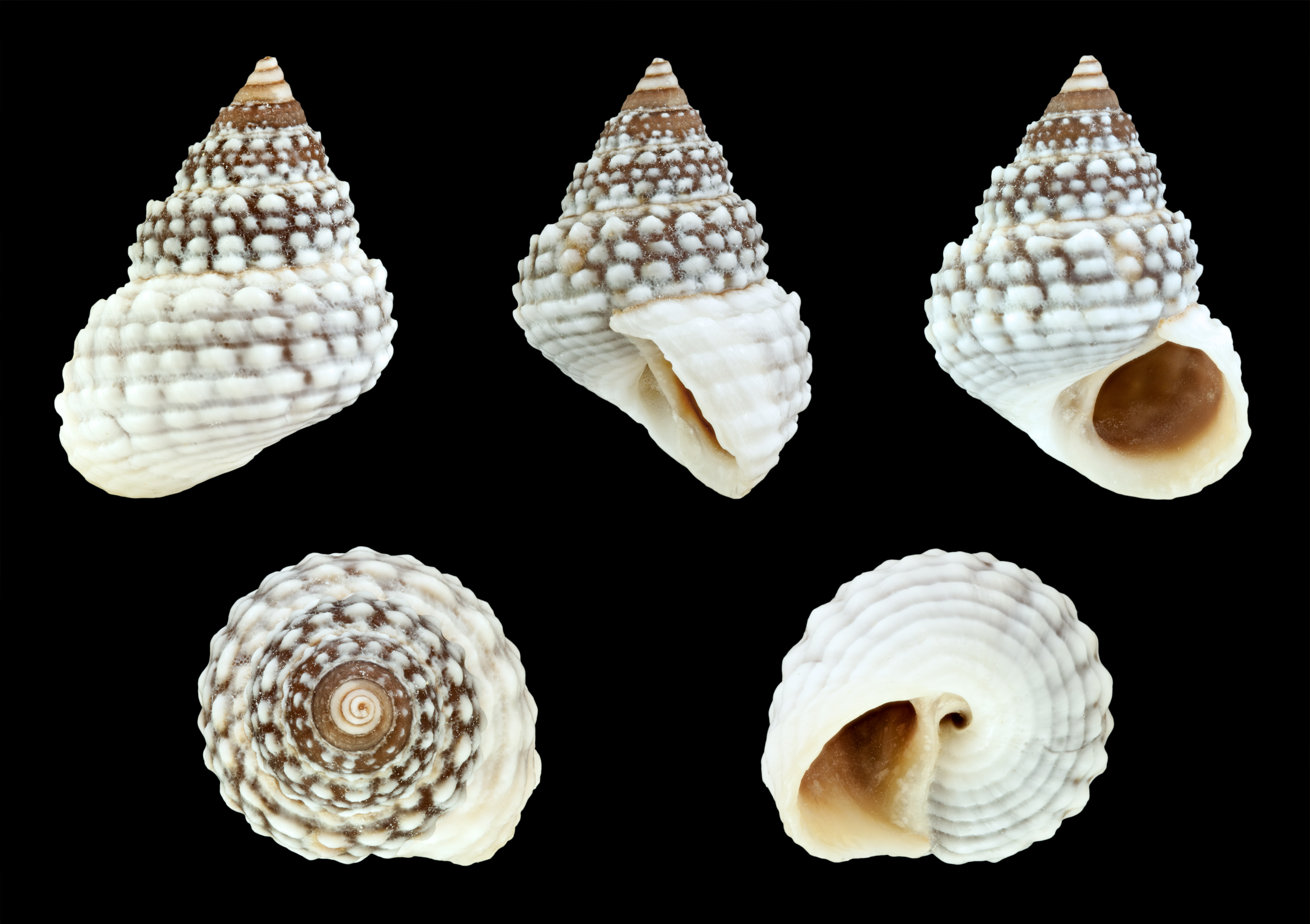
- Five views of a shell of Cenchritis muricatus

Scientific classification
- Kingdom: Animalia
- Phylum: Mollusca
- Class: Gastropoda
- Subclass: Caenogastropoda
- Order: Littorinimorpha
- Family: Littorinidae
- Genus: Cenchritis
- Species: C. muricatus

Binomial name
- Cenchritis muricatus (Linnaeus, 1758)

Synonyms
- Tectarius muricatus (Linnaeus, 1758); Trochus muricatus Linnaeus, 1758; Turbo muricatus Linnaeus, 1758

= Cenchritis muricatus =

Species of gastropod

Cenchritis muricatus is a species of sea snail in the family Littorinidae, the winkles or periwinkles. It occurs in the Caribbean Sea, the Gulf of Mexico and the Lesser Antilles. It is known commonly as the beaded periwinkle.

This snail often crawls out of the water and climbs vertical rocky cliffs to heights of over 14 meters, where it avoids desiccation and overheating by hiding in moist crevices.
