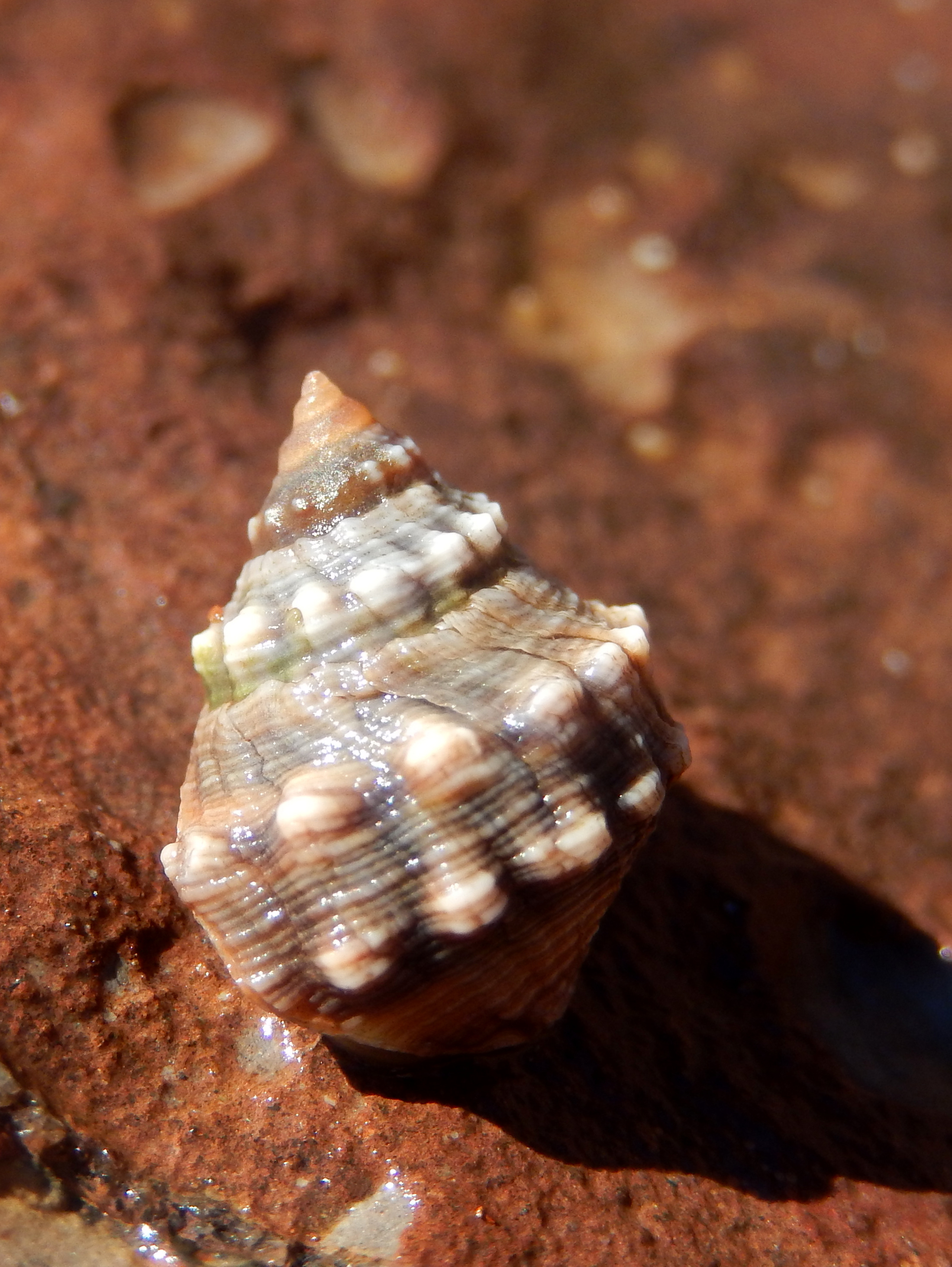
- Nodilittorina pyramidalis

Scientific classification
- Domain: Eukaryota
- Kingdom: Animalia
- Phylum: Mollusca
- Class: Gastropoda
- Subclass: Caenogastropoda
- Order: Littorinimorpha
- Superfamily: Littorinoidea
- Family: Littorinidae
- Genus: Nodilittorina; Martens, 1897

Type species
- Littorina pyramidalis Quoy & Gaimard, 1833

Synonyms
- Nodilittorina (Nodilittorina) E. von Martens, 1897

= Nodilittorina =

Genus of gastropods

Nodilittorina is a genus of small sea snails. marine gastropod mollusks in the family Littorinidae, the winkles or periwinkles.

Many species that were previously placed in this genus have been moved to the genus Echinolittorina.

== Species ==
Species within the genus Nodilittorina include:

- † Nodolittorina guespellensis Dolin & Pacaud, 2000
- † Nodolittorina lozoueti Dolin & Pacaud, 2000
- Nodilittorina pyramidalis (Quoy & Gaimard, 1833)

Nomen nudum

- Nodilittorina quadricincta (Megerle von Mühlfeld, 1824)

Species brought into synonymy

- Nodilittorina acutispira (E. A. Smith, 1892): synonym of Afrolittorina acutispira (E. A. Smith, 1892)
- Nodilittorina africana (F. Krauss in Philippi, 1847): synonym of Afrolittorina africana (F. Krauss in Philippi, 1847) (superseded combination)
- Nodilittorina albicarinata (McLean, 1970): synonym of Echinolittorina albicarinata (McLean, 1970)
- Nodilittorina angustior (Mörch, 1876): synonym of Echinolittorina angustior (Mörch, 1876)
- Nodilittorina antipodum (Philippi, 1847): synonym of Austrolittorina antipodum (Philippi, 1847)
- Nodilittorina apicina (Menke, 1851): synonym of Echinolittorina apicina (Menke, 1851)
- Nodilittorina arabica El Assal, 1990: synonym of Echinolittorina arabica (El Assal, 1990)
- Nodilittorina araucana (d'Orbigny, 1840): synonym of Austrolittorina araucana (d'Orbigny, 1840)
- Nodilittorina aspera (Philippi, 1846): synonym of Echinolittorina aspera (Philippi, 1846)
- Nodilittorina atrata (C. B. Adams, 1852): synonym of Echinolittorina atrata (C. B. Adams, 1852)
- Nodilittorina australis (Gray, 1826): synonym of Echinolittorina australis (Gray, 1826)
- Nodilittorina cincta (Quoy & Gaimard, 1833): synonym of Austrolittorina cincta (Quoy & Gaimard, 1833)
- Nodilittorina cinerea (Pease, 1869): synonym of Echinolittorina cinerea (Pease, 1869)
- Nodilittorina conspersa (Philippi, 1847): synonym of Echinolittorina conspersa (Philippi, 1847)
- Nodilittorina dilatata (d'Orbigny, 1841): synonym of Echinolittorina dilatata (d'Orbigny, 1841)
- Nodilittorina dubiosa (C. B. Adams, 1852): synonym of Echinolittorina dubiosa (C. B. Adams, 1852)
- Nodilittorina eudeli (G. B. Sowerby III, 1915): synonym of Echinolittorina melanacme (E. A. Smith, 1876)
- Nodilittorina exigua (Dunker, 1860): synonym of Echinolittorina radiata (Souleyet, 1852)
- Nodilittorina feejeensis (Reeve, 1857): synonym of Echinolittorina feejeensis (Reeve, 1857)
- Nodilittorina fernandezensis (Rosewater, 1970): synonym of Austrolittorina fernandezensis (Rosewater, 1970)
- Nodilittorina fuscolineata D. Reid, 2002: synonym of Echinolittorina fuscolineata (D. Reid, 2002)
- Nodilittorina galapagiensis (Stearns, 1892): synonym of Echinolittorina lemniscata (Philippi, 1846)
- Nodilittorina granosa (Philippi, 1845): synonym of Echinolittorina granosa (Philippi, 1845) (recombination)
- Nodilittorina granularis (Gray, 1839): synonym of Echinolittorina miliaris (Quoy & Gaimard, 1833)
- Nodilittorina hawaiiensis Rosewater & Kadolsky, 1981: synonym of Echinolittorina hawaiiensis (Rosewater & Kadolsky, 1981)
- Nodilittorina helenae (E. A. Smith, 1890): synonym of Echinolittorina helenae (E. A. Smith, 1890) (recombination)
- Nodilittorina interrupta (Philippi, 1847): synonym of Echinolittorina interrupta (Philippi, 1847)
- Nodilittorina knysnaensis (F. Krauss in Philippi, 1847): synonym of Afrolittorina knysnaensis (F. Krauss in Philippi, 1847) (superseded combination)
- Nodilittorina lineolata (d'Orbigny, 1840): synonym of Echinolittorina lineolata (d'Orbigny, 1840)
- Nodilittorina meleagris (Potiez & Michaud, 1838): synonym of Echinolittorina meleagris (Potiez & Michaud, 1838)
- Nodilittorina mespillum (Megerle von Mühlfeld, 1824): synonym of Echinolittorina mespillum (Megerle von Mühlfeld, 1824)
- Nodilittorina millegrana (Philippi, 1848): synonym of Echinolittorina millegrana (Philippi, 1848)
- Nodilittorina modesta (Philippi, 1846): synonym of Echinolittorina modesta (Philippi, 1846)
- Nodilittorina mordax Bandel & Kadolsky, 1982: synonym of Echinolittorina jamaicensis (C. B. Adams, 1850)
- Nodilittorina natalensis (F. Krauss in Philippi, 1847): synonym of Echinolittorina natalensis (Philippi, 1847) (superseded combination)
- Nodilittorina nodosa (Gray, 1839): synonym of Echinolittorina australis (Gray, 1826)
- Nodilittorina parcipicta (Carpenter, 1864): synonym of Echinolittorina parcipicta (Carpenter, 1864)
- Nodilittorina pascua (Rosewater, 1970): synonym of Echinolittorina pascua (Rosewater, 1970)
- Nodilittorina paytensis (Philippi, 1847): synonym of Echinolittorina paytensis (Philippi, 1847)
- Nodilittorina penicillata (Carpenter, 1864): synonym of Echinolittorina penicillata (Carpenter, 1864)
- Nodilittorina peruviana (Lamarck, 1822): synonym of Echinolittorina peruviana (Lamarck, 1822)
- Nodilittorina pintado (Wood, 1828): synonym of Littoraria pintado (Wood, 1828)
- Nodilittorina porcata (Philippi, 1846): synonym of Echinolittorina porcata (Philippi, 1846)
- Nodilittorina praetermissa (May, 1909): synonym of Afrolittorina praetermissa (May, 1909)
- Nodilittorina punctata (Gmelin, 1791): synonym of Echinolittorina punctata (Gmelin, 1791) (recombination)
- Nodilittorina radiata (Souleyet, 1852): synonym of Echinolittorina radiata (Souleyet, 1852)
- Nodilittorina riisei (Mörch, 1876): synonym of Echinolittorina jamaicensis (C. B. Adams, 1850)
- Nodilittorina santelenae D. Reid, 2002: synonym of Echinolittorina santelenae (D. Reid, 2002)
- Nodilittorina striata (P. P. King, 1832): synonym of Tectarius striatus (P. P. King, 1832)
- Nodilittorina subnodosa (Philippi, 1847): synonym of Echinolittorina subnodosa (Philippi, 1847) (superseded combination)
- Nodilittorina sundaica (Van Regteren Altena, 1945): synonym of Echinolittorina sundaica (Van Regteren Altena, 1945)
- Nodilittorina tenuistriata D. Reid, 2002: synonym of Echinolittorina tenuistriata (D. Reid, 2002)
- Nodilittorina trochoides (Gray, 1839): synonym of Echinolittorina pascua (Rosewater, 1970)
- Nodilittorina tuberculata (Menke, 1828): synonym of Echinolittorina tuberculata (Menke, 1828)
- Nodilittorina unifasciata (Gray, 1826): synonym of Austrolittorina unifasciata (Gray, 1826)
- Nodilittorina vermeiji Bandel & Kadolsky, 1982: synonym of Echinolittorina vermeiji (Bandel & Kadolsky, 1982)
- Nodilittorina vidua (Gould, 1859): synonym of Echinolittorina vidua (Gould, 1859)
- Nodilittorina ziczac (Gmelin, 1791): synonym of Echinolittorina ziczac (Gmelin, 1791)
