= Echinolittorina placida =

Scientific classification
- Kingdom: Animalia
- Phylum: Mollusca
- Class: Gastropoda
- Subclass: Caenogastropoda
- Order: Littorinimorpha
- Family: Littorinidae
- Genus: Echinolittorina
- Species: E. placida

Binomial name
- Echinolittorina placida Reid, 2009

Species of gastropod

Echinolittorina placida is a species of sea snail, a marine gastropod mollusc in the family Littorinidae, the winkles. This species was not described until 2009 because it had previously been confused with, and not differentiated from, a similar-looking species, Echinolittorina interrupta.

== Distribution ==
This species occurs in the Gulf of Mexico.

== Habitat ==
Rocks or other hard substrates of the splash zone (supralittoral) where they spend most of their time out of the water. A herbivorous species that feeds on microscopic marine algae, growing on rocks.
