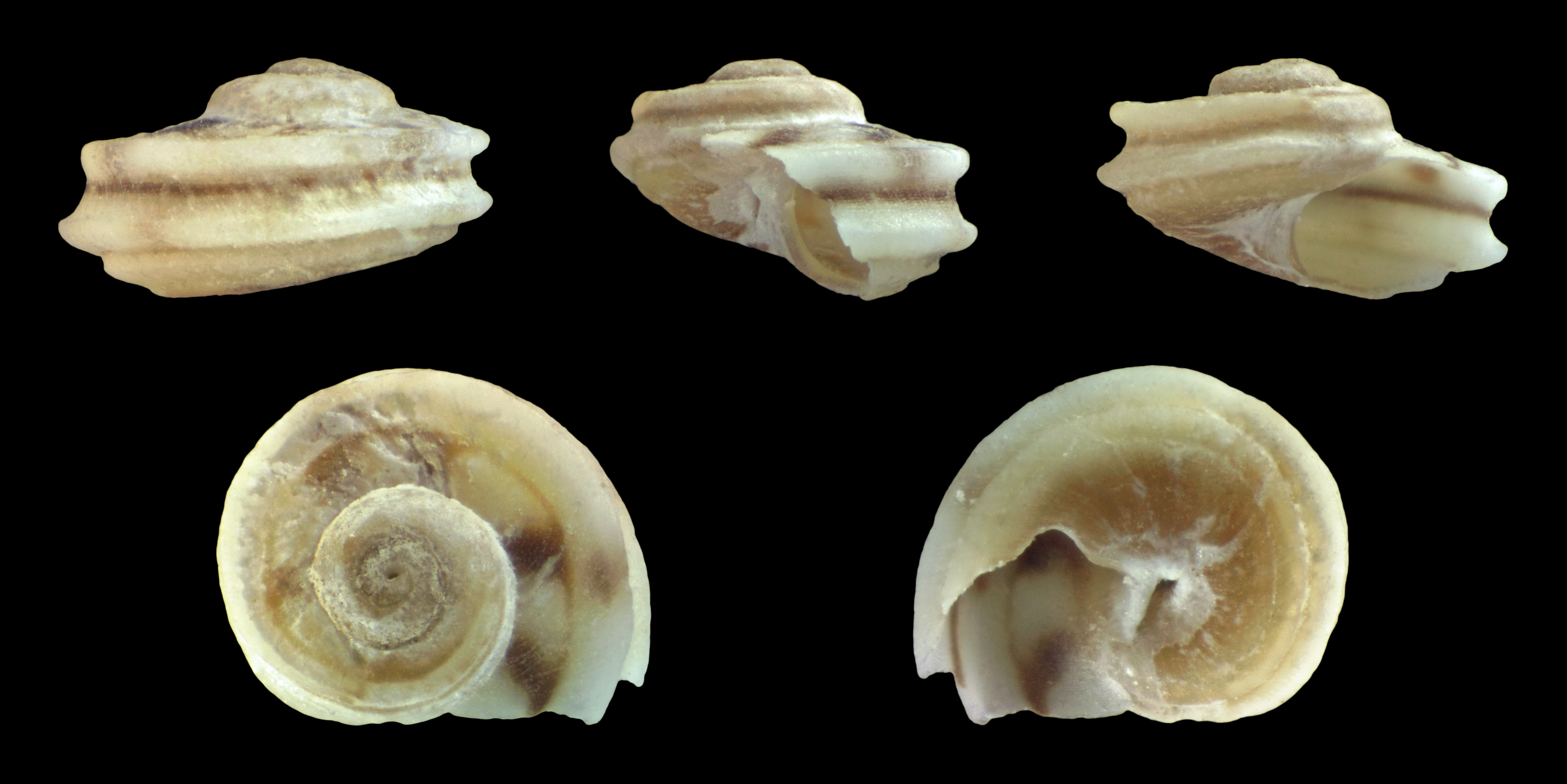

Scientific classification
- Kingdom: Animalia
- Phylum: Mollusca
- Class: Gastropoda
- Subclass: Caenogastropoda
- Order: Littorinimorpha
- Family: Littorinidae
- Genus: Risellopsis
- Species: R. varia

Binomial name
- Risellopsis varia (Hutton, 1873)

Synonyms
- Risellopsis varia var. carinata Kesteven, 1902

= Risellopsis varia =

Species of gastropod

Risellopsis varia is a species of sea snail, a marine gastropod mollusk in the family Littorinidae, the winkles or periwinkles.
