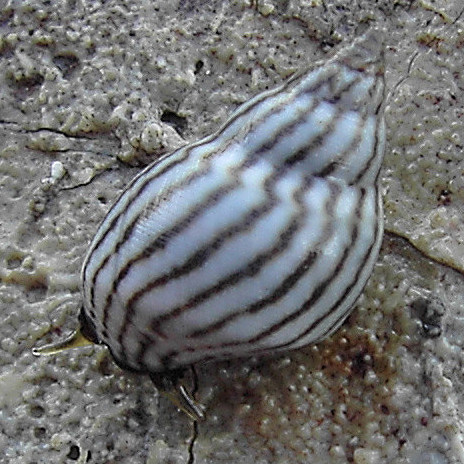
- A live and active individual of Echinolittorina ziczac

Scientific classification
- Kingdom: Animalia
- Phylum: Mollusca
- Class: Gastropoda
- Subclass: Caenogastropoda
- Order: Littorinimorpha
- Family: Littorinidae
- Subfamily: Littorininae
- Genus: Echinolittorina; Habe, 1956

Synonyms
- Amerolittorina Reid, 2009; Echinolittorina (Amerolittorina) Reid, 2009; Echinolittorina (Echinolittorina) Habe, 1956; Echinolittorina (Fossarilittorina) Rosewater, 1981; Echinolittorina (Granulilittorina) Habe & Kosuge, 1966; Echinolittorina (Lineolittorina) Reid, 2009; Fossarilittorina Rosewater, 1981; Granulilittorina Habe & Kosuge, 1966; Lineolittorina Reid, 2009; Littorina (Fossarilittorina) Rosewater, 1981; Nodilittorina (Echinolittorina) Habe, 1956; Nodilittorina (Fossarilittorina) Rosewater, 1981

= Echinolittorina =

Echinolittorina Temporal range: Quaternary–Recent

Genus of gastropods

Echinolittorina is a genus of small sea snails, marine gastropod molluscs in the family Littorinidae, the winkles.

== Species ==
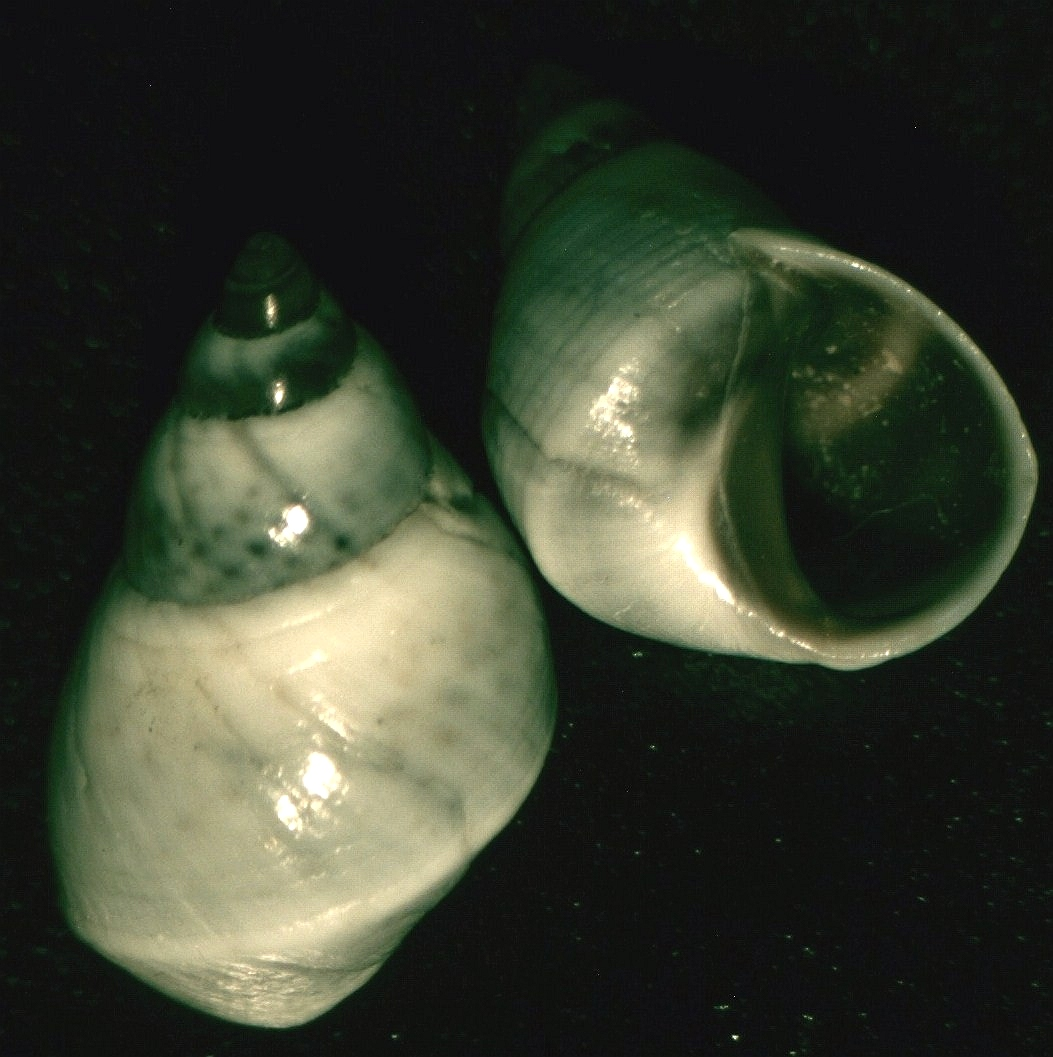
Two shells of Echinolittorina paytensis

According to the World Register of Marine Species (WoRMS), the following extant species with valid names are included within the genus Echinolittorina:

- Echinolittorina albicarinata (McLean, 1970)
- Echinolittorina angustior (Mörch, 1876)
- Echinolittorina apicina (Menke, 1851)
- Echinolittorina arabica (El Assal, 1990)
- Echinolittorina aspera (Philippi, 1846)
- Echinolittorina atrata (C.B. Adams, 1852)
- Echinolittorina australis (Gray, 1826)
- Echinolittorina austrotrochoides Reid, 2007
- Echinolittorina biangulata (Martens, 1897)
- Echinolittorina caboverdensis Reid, 2011
- Echinolittorina cecillei (Philippi, 1851)
- Echinolittorina cinerea (Pease, 1869)
- Echinolittorina conspersa (Philippi, 1847)
- Echinolittorina dilatata (d'Orbigny, 1842)
- Echinolittorina dubiosa (C.B. Adams, 1852)
- Echinolittorina feejeensis (Reeve, 1857)
- Echinolittorina fuscolineata (Reid, 2002)
- Echinolittorina granosa (Philippi, 1845)
- Echinolittorina hawaiiensis (Rosewater & Kadolsky, 1981)
- Echinolittorina helenae (E.A. Smith, 1890)
- Echinolittorina interrupta (C.B. Adams in Philippi, 1847)
- Echinolittorina jamaicensis (C.B. Adams, 1850)
- Echinolittorina lemniscata (Philippi, 1846)
- Echinolittorina leucosticta (Philippi, 1847)
- Echinolittorina lineolata (d’Orbigny, 1840)
- Echinolittorina malaccana (Philippi, 1847)
- Echinolittorina marisrubri Reid, 2007
- Echinolittorina marquesensis Reid, 2007
- Echinolittorina melanacme (E.A. Smith, 1876)
- Echinolittorina meleagris (Beck in Potiez & Michaud, 1838)
- Echinolittorina mespillum (Mühlfeld, 1824)
- Echinolittorina miliaris (Quoy & Gaimard, 1833)
- Echinolittorina millegrana (Philippi, 1848)
- Echinolittorina modesta (Philippi, 1846)
- Echinolittorina natalensis (Philippi, 1847)
- Echinolittorina novaezelandiae (Reeve, 1857)
- Echinolittorina omanensis Reid, 2007
- Echinolittorina parcipicta (Carpenter, 1864)
- Echinolittorina pascua (Rosewater, 1970)
- Echinolittorina paytensis (Philippi, 1847)
- Echinolittorina penicillata (Carpenter, 1864)
- Echinolittorina peregrinator Reid, 2011
- Echinolittorina peruviana (Lamarck, 1822)
- Echinolittorina philippinensis Reid, 2007
- Echinolittorina placida Reid, 2009
- Echinolittorina porcata (Philippi, 1846)
- Echinolittorina pulchella (Dunker, 1845)
- Echinolittorina punctata (Gmelin, 1791)
- Echinolittorina quadricincta (Mühlfeld, 1824)
- Echinolittorina radiata (Souleyet in Eydoux & Souleyet, 1852)
- Echinolittorina reticulata (Anton, 1838)
- Echinolittorina santelenae (Reid, 2002)
- Echinolittorina soroziczac Reid, 2011
- Echinolittorina subnodosa (Philippi, 1847)
- Echinolittorina sundaica (van Regteren Altena, 1945)
- Echinolittorina tenuistriata (Reid, 2002)
- Echinolittorina tricincta Reid, 2007
- Echinolittorina tuberculata (Menke, 1828)
- Echinolittorina vermeiji (Bandel & Kadolsky, 1982)
- Echinolittorina vidua (Gould, 1859)
- Echinolittorina wallaceana Reid, 2007
- Echinolittorina ziczac (Gmelin, 1791)

Echinolittorina nielseni (Araya & Reid, 2016) is an extinct species from the Quaternary deposits. Over fifteen specimens were found in northern Chile. This species has a large shell, 15.7-22.2 mm high.

Species brought into synonymy

- Echinolittorina fernandezensis (Rosewater, 1870): synonym of Austrolittorina fernandezensis (Rosewater, 1970)
- Echinolittorina galapagiensis (Stearns, 1892): synonym of Echinolittorina lemniscata (Philippi, 1846)
- Echinolittorina pyramidalis (Quoy & Gaimard, 1833): synonym of Nodilittorina pyramidalis (Quoy & Gaimard, 1833)
- Echinolittorina trochoides (Gray, 1839): synonym of Echinolittorina pascua (Rosewater, 1970)
- Echinolittorina unifasciata (Gray, 1826): synonym of Austrolittorina unifasciata (Gray, 1826)
