= Echinolittorina reticulata =

Scientific classification
- Kingdom: Animalia
- Phylum: Mollusca
- Class: Gastropoda
- Subclass: Caenogastropoda
- Order: Littorinimorpha
- Family: Littorinidae
- Genus: Echinolittorina
- Species: E. reticulata

Binomial name
- Echinolittorina reticulata (Anton, 1838)

Synonyms
- Litorina reticulata Anton, 1838; Littorina granicostata E.A. Smith, 1887; Littorina granocostata Reeve, 1857; Littorina insularis E.A. Smith, 1889

Species of gastropod

Echinolittorina reticulata is a species of sea snail, a marine gastropod mollusc in the family Littorinidae, the winkles or periwinkles.
