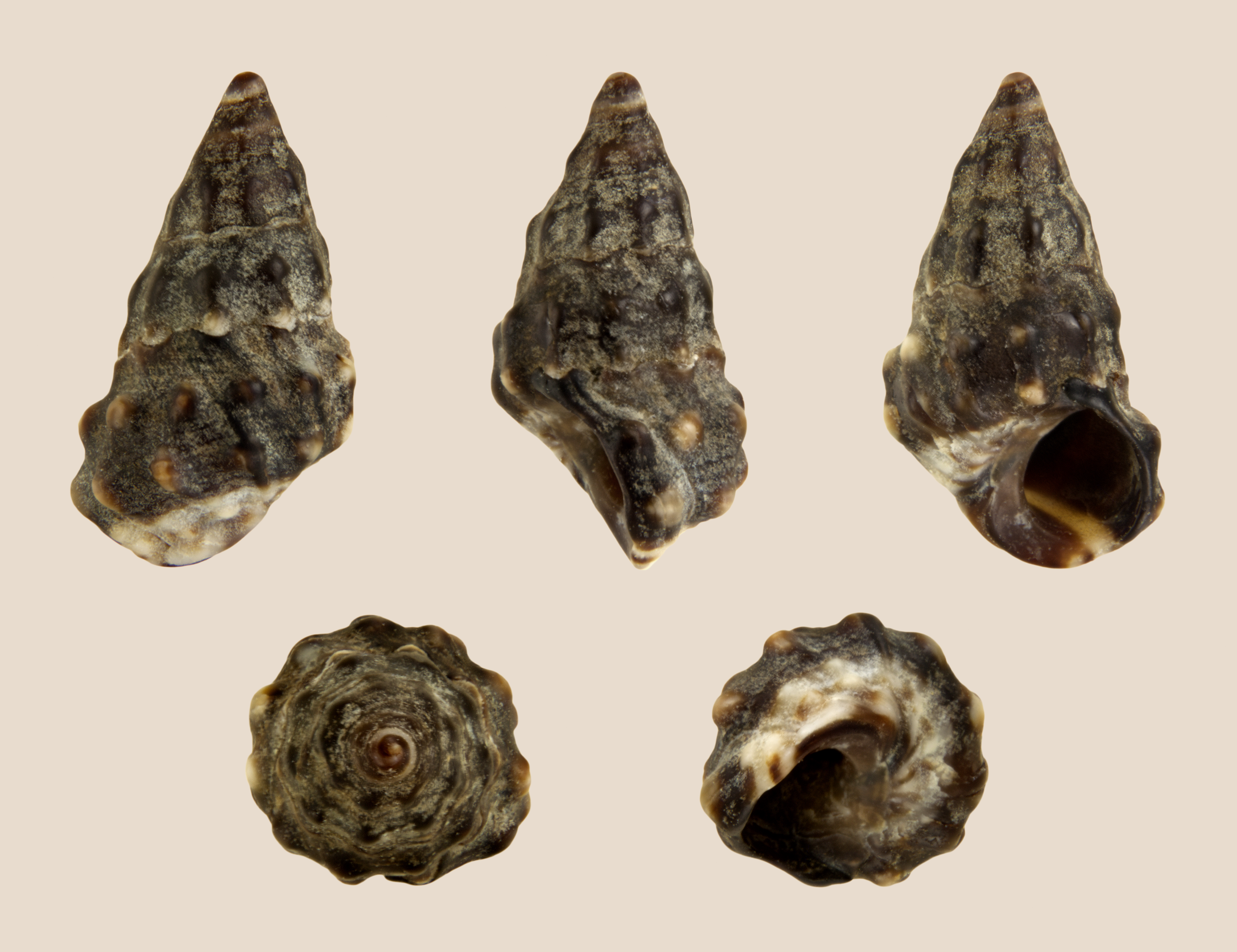

Scientific classification
- Kingdom: Animalia
- Phylum: Mollusca
- Class: Gastropoda
- Subclass: Caenogastropoda
- Order: Littorinimorpha
- Family: Littorinidae
- Genus: Echinolittorina
- Species: E. malaccana

Binomial name
- Echinolittorina malaccana (Philippi, 1847)

Synonyms
- Litorina malaccana Philippi, 1847; Littorina monilifera Souleyet in Eydoux & Souleyet, 1852; Tectarius malaccanus (Philippi, 1847)

= Echinolittorina malaccana =

Species of gastropod

Echinolittorina malaccana is a species of sea snail, a marine gastropod mollusc in the family Littorinidae, the winkles or periwinkles.

== Description ==
Size ranging from 0.8 - 1cm

== Distribution ==
Echinolittorina malaccana are found mostly in the Western Indo-Pacific and Oceania region
