= Echinolittorina austrotrochoides =

Scientific classification
- Kingdom: Animalia
- Phylum: Mollusca
- Class: Gastropoda
- Subclass: Caenogastropoda
- Order: Littorinimorpha
- Family: Littorinidae
- Genus: Echinolittorina
- Species: E. austrotrochoides

Binomial name
- Echinolittorina austrotrochoides Reid, 2007

Species of gastropod

Echinolittorina austrotrochoides is a species of sea snail, a marine gastropod mollusc in the family Littorinidae, the winkles or periwinkles.
