= Mainwaringia leithii =

Scientific classification
- Kingdom: Animalia
- Phylum: Mollusca
- Class: Gastropoda
- Subclass: Caenogastropoda
- Order: Littorinimorpha
- Family: Littorinidae
- Genus: Mainwaringia
- Species: M. leithii

Binomial name
- Mainwaringia leithii (E. A. Smith, 1876)

Synonyms
- Alaba leithii E.A. Smith, 1876; Melania paludomoidea Nevill, 1885

Species of gastropod

Mainwaringia leithii is a species of sea snail, a marine gastropod mollusk in the family Littorinidae, the winkles or periwinkles.
