= Echinolittorina novaezelandiae =

Scientific classification
- Kingdom: Animalia
- Phylum: Mollusca
- Class: Gastropoda
- Subclass: Caenogastropoda
- Order: Littorinimorpha
- Family: Littorinidae
- Genus: Echinolittorina
- Species: E. novaezelandiae

Binomial name
- Echinolittorina novaezelandiae (Reeve, 1857)

Synonyms
- Littorina erronea Nevill, 1885; Littorina novaezaelandiae Pritchard & Gatliff, 1902; Littorina novaezelandiae Reeve, 1857

Species of gastropod

Echinolittorina novaezelandiae is a species of sea snail, a marine gastropod mollusc in the family Littorinidae, the winkles or periwinkles.
