= Echinolittorina biangulata =

Scientific classification
- Kingdom: Animalia
- Phylum: Mollusca
- Class: Gastropoda
- Subclass: Caenogastropoda
- Order: Littorinimorpha
- Family: Littorinidae
- Genus: Echinolittorina
- Species: E. biangulata

Binomial name
- Echinolittorina biangulata (Martens, 1897)

Synonyms
- Littorina biangulata Martens, 1897

Species of gastropod

Echinolittorina biangulata is a species of sea snail in the Indo-West Pacific Ocean, a marine gastropod mollusc in the family Littorinidae, the winkles or periwinkles.
