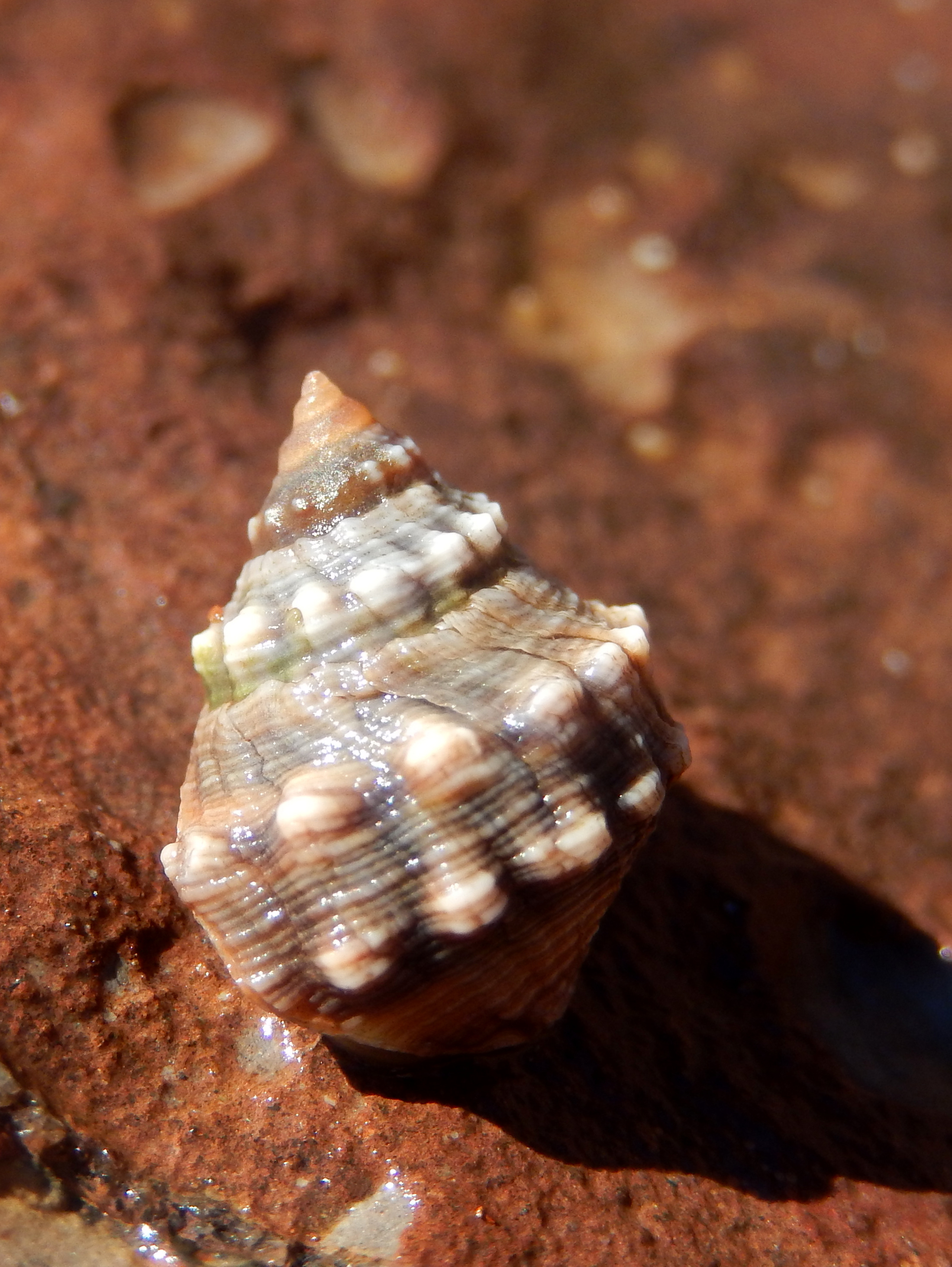
- at Long Reef, Australia

Scientific classification
- Kingdom: Animalia
- Phylum: Mollusca
- Class: Gastropoda
- Subclass: Caenogastropoda
- Order: Littorinimorpha
- Family: Littorinidae
- Genus: Nodilittorina
- Species: N. pyramidalis

Binomial name
- Nodilittorina pyramidalis (Quoy & Gaimard, 1833)

Synonyms
- Echinolittorina pyramidalis (Quoy & Gaimard, 1833); Littorina pyramidalis Quoy & Gaimard, 1833 (original combination); Trochus nodulosus Gmelin, 1791 (invalid: junior homonym of Trochus nodulosus Solander, 1766)

= Nodilittorina pyramidalis =

Species of gastropod

Nodilittorina pyramidalis, commonly known as a pyramid periwinkle, is a species of sea snail, a marine gastropod mollusc in the family Littorinidae, the winkles or periwinkles.

The subspecies Nodilittorina pyramidalis pascua Rosewater, 1970 is a synonym of Echinolittorina pascua (Rosewater, 1970)

== Description ==
The pyramid periwinkle is small, ranging from 2.5 cm to less than 1 cm in length. It is pale grey in colour, with two rows of nodules on the central whirl of its body which are a pale buff colour.

It lives on or above the high tide line, usually clinging to vertical surfaces. Many individuals will cluster together in crevices to maintain moisture.

== Distribution ==
Pyramid periwinkles are endemic to Australia and can be found in abundance on both the east and west coasts.
