= Echinolittorina quadricincta =

Scientific classification
- Kingdom: Animalia
- Phylum: Mollusca
- Class: Gastropoda
- Subclass: Caenogastropoda
- Order: Littorinimorpha
- Family: Littorinidae
- Genus: Echinolittorina
- Species: E. quadricincta

Binomial name
- Echinolittorina quadricincta (Mühlfeld, 1824)

Synonyms
- Trochus quadricinctus Mühlfeld, 1824

Species of gastropod

Echinolittorina quadricincta is a species of sea snail, a marine gastropod mollusc in the family Littorinidae, the winkles or periwinkles.
