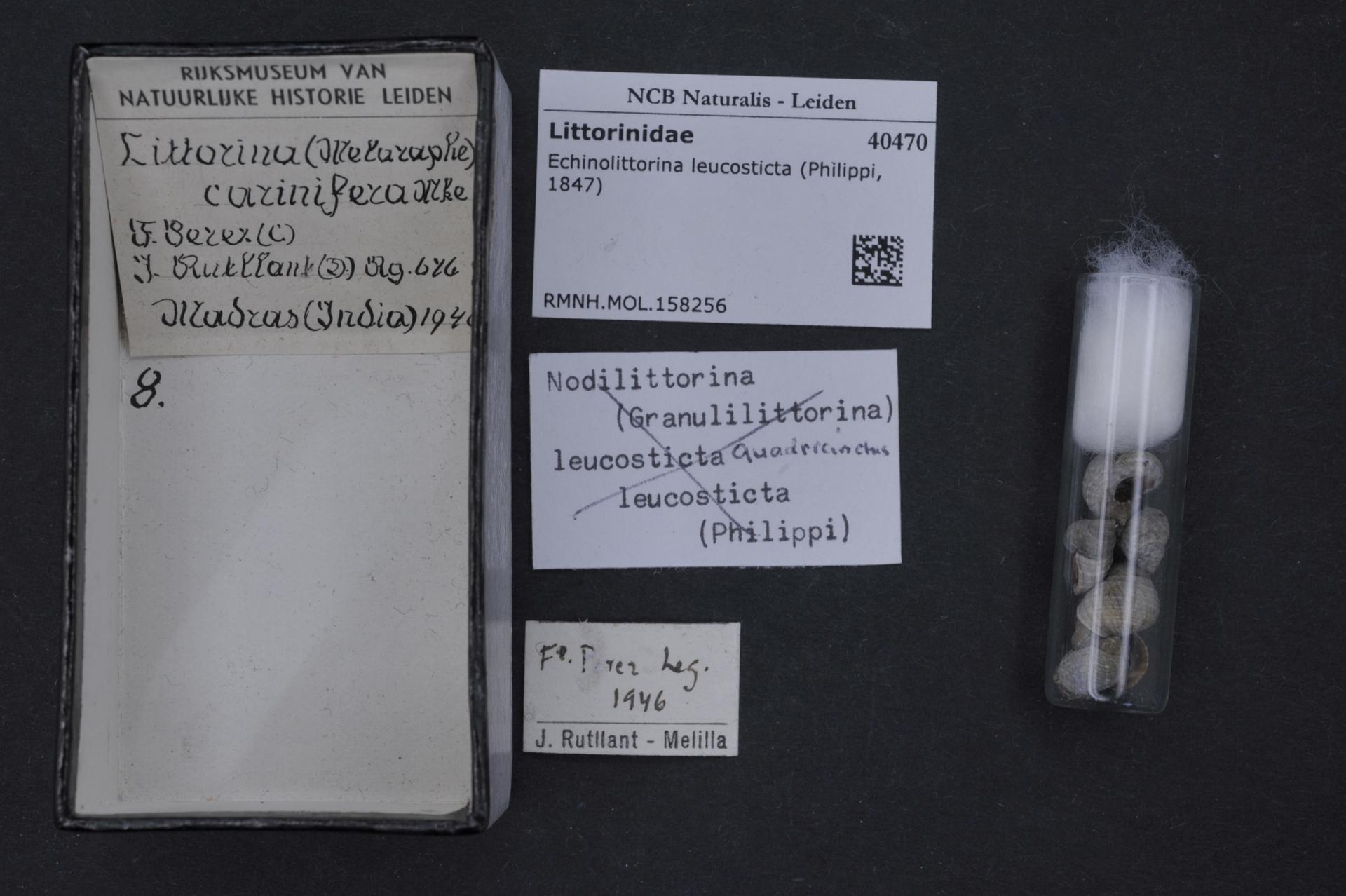
- Preserved Echinolittorina leucosticta specimen

Scientific classification
- Kingdom: Animalia
- Phylum: Mollusca
- Class: Gastropoda
- Subclass: Caenogastropoda
- Order: Littorinimorpha
- Family: Littorinidae
- Genus: Echinolittorina
- Species: E. leucosticta

Binomial name
- Echinolittorina leucosticta (Philippi, 1847)

Synonyms
- Litorina leucosticta Philippi, 1847; Melarhaphe subgranosa Dunker in Dunker & Zelebor, 1866

= Echinolittorina leucosticta =

Species of gastropod

Echinolittorina leucosticta is a species of sea snail, a marine gastropod mollusc in the family Littorinidae, the winkles or periwinkles.
