= Echinolittorina omanensis =

Scientific classification
- Kingdom: Animalia
- Phylum: Mollusca
- Class: Gastropoda
- Subclass: Caenogastropoda
- Order: Littorinimorpha
- Family: Littorinidae
- Genus: Echinolittorina
- Species: E. omanensis

Binomial name
- Echinolittorina omanensis Reid, 2007

Species of gastropod

Echinolittorina omanensis is a species of sea snail, a marine gastropod mollusc in the family Littorinidae, the winkles or periwinkles.
