= Pellilitorina setosa =

Scientific classification
- Kingdom: Animalia
- Phylum: Mollusca
- Class: Gastropoda
- Subclass: Caenogastropoda
- Order: Littorinimorpha
- Family: Littorinidae
- Genus: Pellilitorina
- Species: P. setosa

Binomial name
- Pellilitorina setosa (E.A. Smith, 1875)

Species of gastropod

Pellilitorina setosa is a species of sea snail, a marine gastropod mollusc in the family Littorinidae, the winkles or periwinkles. The reproduce sexually.
