= Pellilitorina pellita =

Scientific classification
- Kingdom: Animalia
- Phylum: Mollusca
- Class: Gastropoda
- Subclass: Caenogastropoda
- Order: Littorinimorpha
- Family: Littorinidae
- Genus: Pellilitorina
- Species: P. pellita

Binomial name
- Pellilitorina pellita (Martens, 1885)

Species of gastropod

Pellilitorina pellita is a species of sea snail, a marine gastropod mollusc in the family Littorinidae, the winkles or periwinkles.
