= Mainwaringia rhizophila =

Scientific classification
- Kingdom: Animalia
- Phylum: Mollusca
- Class: Gastropoda
- Subclass: Caenogastropoda
- Order: Littorinimorpha
- Family: Littorinidae
- Genus: Mainwaringia
- Species: M. rhizophila

Binomial name
- Mainwaringia rhizophila Reid, 1986

Species of gastropod

Mainwaringia rhizophila is a species of sea snail, a marine gastropod mollusk in the family Littorinidae, the winkles or periwinkles.
