= Echinolittorina porcata =

Scientific classification
- Kingdom: Animalia
- Phylum: Mollusca
- Class: Gastropoda
- Subclass: Caenogastropoda
- Order: Littorinimorpha
- Family: Littorinidae
- Genus: Echinolittorina
- Species: E. porcata

Binomial name
- Echinolittorina porcata (Philippi, 1846)

Synonyms
- Littorina porcata Philippi, 1846; Nodilittorina porcata (Philippi, 1846); Peasiella roosevelti Bartsch & Rehder, 1939

Species of gastropod

Echinolittorina porcata is a species of sea snail, a marine gastropod mollusc in the family Littorinidae, the winkles or periwinkles.
