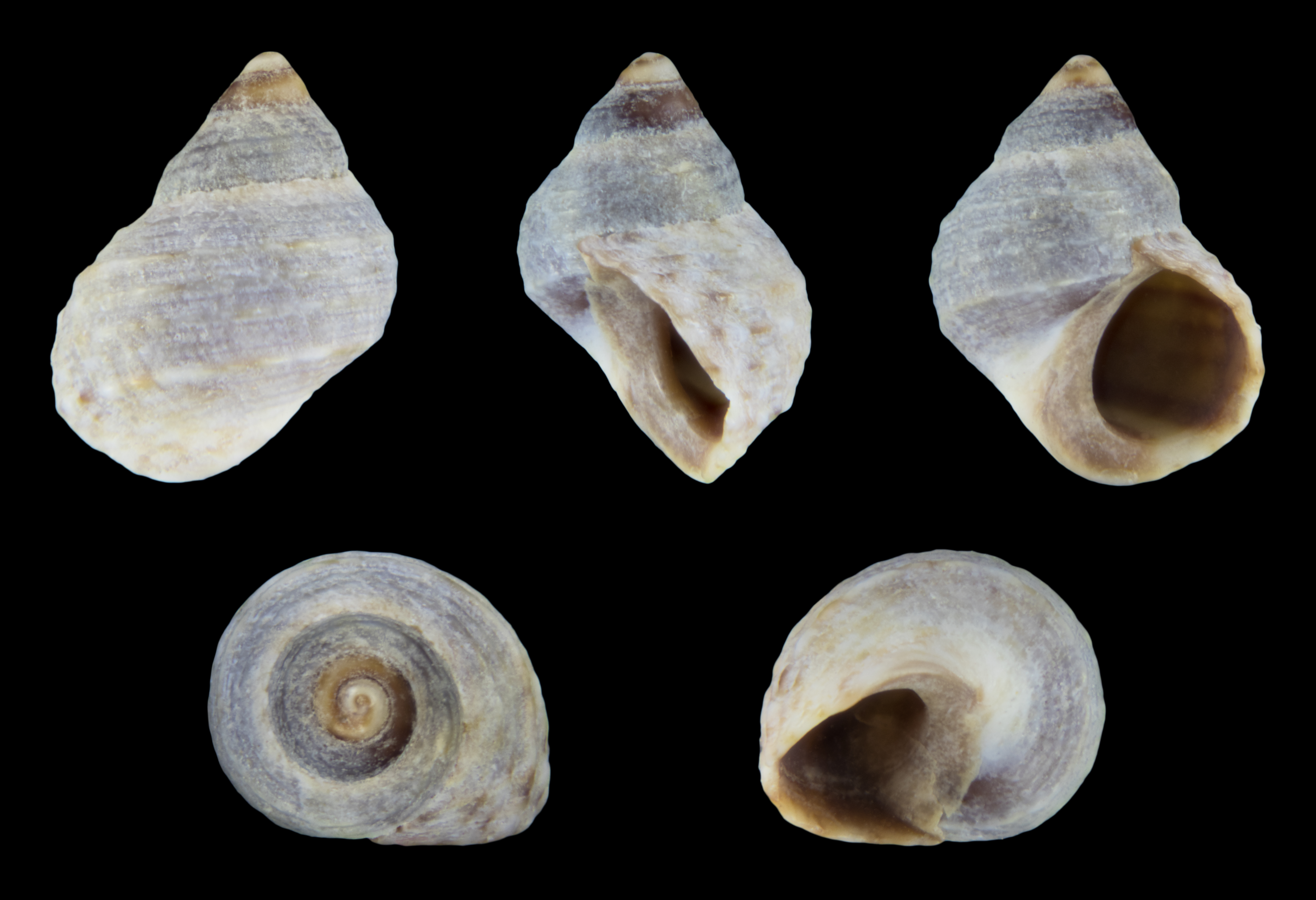

Scientific classification
- Kingdom: Animalia
- Phylum: Mollusca
- Class: Gastropoda
- Subclass: Caenogastropoda
- Order: Littorinimorpha
- Family: Littorinidae
- Genus: Echinolittorina
- Species: E. radiata

Binomial name
- Echinolittorina radiata (Souleyet in Eydoux & Souleyet, 1852)

Synonyms
- Littorina radiata Souleyet in Eydoux & Souleyet, 1852

= Echinolittorina radiata =

Species of gastropod

Echinolittorina radiata is a species of sea snail, a marine gastropod mollusc in the family Littorinidae, the winkles or periwinkles.
