= Echinolittorina cinerea =

Scientific classification
- Kingdom: Animalia
- Phylum: Mollusca
- Class: Gastropoda
- Subclass: Caenogastropoda
- Order: Littorinimorpha
- Family: Littorinidae
- Genus: Echinolittorina
- Species: E. cinerea

Binomial name
- Echinolittorina cinerea (Pease, 1869)

Synonyms
- Littorina cinerea Pease, 1869

Species of gastropod

Echinolittorina cinerea is a species of sea snail, a marine gastropod mollusk in the family Littorinidae, the winkles or periwinkles.
