= Echinolittorina miliaris =

Scientific classification
- Kingdom: Animalia
- Phylum: Mollusca
- Class: Gastropoda
- Subclass: Caenogastropoda
- Order: Littorinimorpha
- Family: Littorinidae
- Genus: Echinolittorina
- Species: E. miliaris

Binomial name
- Echinolittorina miliaris (Quoy & Gaimard, 1833)

Synonyms
- Littorina miliaris Quoy & Gaimard, 1833; Tectarius miliaris (Quoy & Gaimard, 1832)

Species of gastropod

Echinolittorina miliaris is a species of sea snail, a marine gastropod mollusc in the family Littorinidae, the winkles or periwinkles.

== Description ==
The maximum recorded shell length is 20 mm.

== Habitat ==
Minimum recorded depth is 0 m. Maximum recorded depth is 0 m.
