= Echinolittorina hawaiiensis =

Scientific classification
- Kingdom: Animalia
- Phylum: Mollusca
- Class: Gastropoda
- Subclass: Caenogastropoda
- Order: Littorinimorpha
- Family: Littorinidae
- Genus: Echinolittorina
- Species: E. hawaiiensis

Binomial name
- Echinolittorina hawaiiensis (Rosewater & Kadolsky, 1981)

Synonyms
- Littorina picta Philippi, 1846; Nodilittorina hawaiiensis Rosewater & Kadolsky, 1981

Species of mollusc

Echinolittorina hawaiiensis or Hawaiian Periwinkle is a marine gastropod mollusk in the family Littorinidae. It is endemic to Hawaii and is mostly found in clusters on rocky shores in the high intertidal.

== Distribution and habitat ==
Echinolittorina hawaiiensis is endemic to Hawaii. It is abundant in clusters on rocky shores just above the waterline.

== Anatomy and morphology ==
The shell of Echinolittorina hawaiiensis can be up to 1cm in size, and is round and cone shaped. The shell of Echinolittorina hawaiiensis has a sometimes sculptured shell due to environmental polymorphism. sculpture. The shell also traps water, which allows the snail to hibernate for long periods. They develop into planktonic trochophore larvae.
