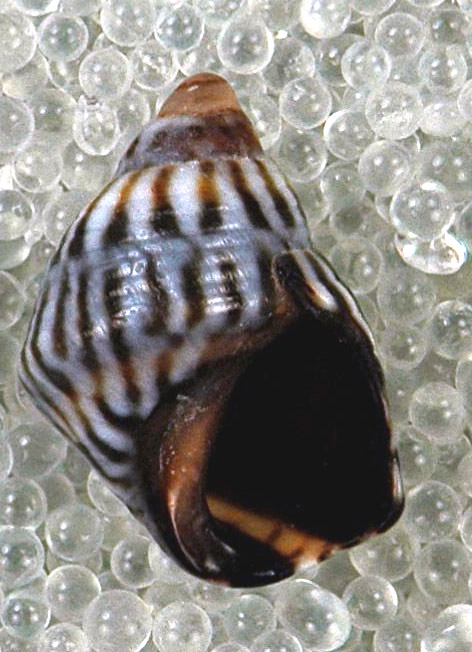
- Echinolittorina jamaicensis shell

Scientific classification
- Kingdom: Animalia
- Phylum: Mollusca
- Class: Gastropoda
- Subclass: Caenogastropoda
- Order: Littorinimorpha
- Family: Littorinidae
- Genus: Echinolittorina
- Species: E. jamaicensis

Binomial name
- Echinolittorina jamaicensis (C. B. Adams, 1850)

Synonyms
- Austrolittorina mordax Bandel, K. & D. Kadolsky, 1988; Litorina angustior Weinkauff, H.C., 1883; Litorina carinata Weinkauff, H.C., 1878; Littorina (Melarhaphe) floccosa var. a Mörch, O.A.L., 1876; Littorina glaucocincta Mörch, 1876; Littorina jamaicensis C.B. Adams, 1850; Littorina riisei Mörch, 1876; Nodilittorina (Nodilittorina) glaucocincta "Beck, H.H. MS" Mörch, O.A.L., 1982; Nodilittorina jamaicensis (C.B. Adams, 1850); Nodilittorina mordax Bandel & Kadolsky, 1982; Nodilittorina riisei (Mörch, 1876)

= Echinolittorina jamaicensis =

Species of gastropod

Echinolittorina jamaicensis is a species of sea snail, a marine gastropod mollusc in the family Littorinidae, the winkles or periwinkles.

== Distribution ==
This species is distributed throughout the Caribbean region.

== Description ==
The maximum recorded shell length is 19.1 mm.

== Habitat ==
Minimum recorded depth is 0 m.
