= Echinolittorina arabica =

Scientific classification
- Kingdom: Animalia
- Phylum: Mollusca
- Class: Gastropoda
- Subclass: Caenogastropoda
- Order: Littorinimorpha
- Family: Littorinidae
- Genus: Echinolittorina
- Species: E. arabica

Binomial name
- Echinolittorina arabica (El Assal, 1990)

Synonyms
- Nodilittorina arabica El Assal, 1990

Species of gastropod

Echinolittorina arabica is a species of sea snail, a marine gastropod mollusk in the family Littorinidae, the winkles or periwinkles.
