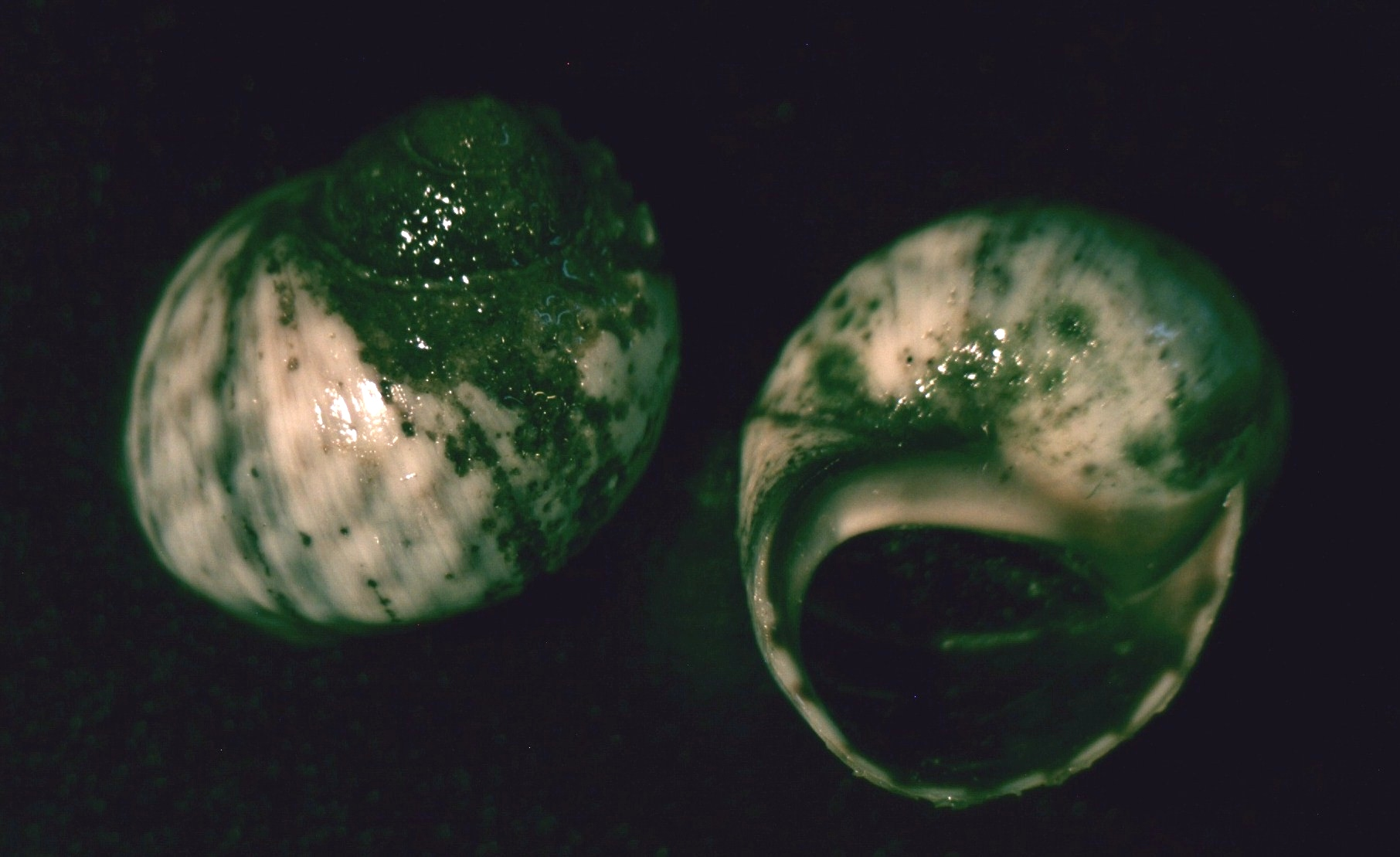
- Afrolittorina praetermissa

Scientific classification
- Kingdom: Animalia
- Phylum: Mollusca
- Class: Gastropoda
- Subclass: Caenogastropoda
- Order: Littorinimorpha
- Family: Littorinidae
- Genus: Afrolittorina; Williams, Reid & Littlewood, 2003

= Afrolittorina =

Genus of gastropods

Afrolittorina is a genus of sea snails, marine gastropod mollusks in the family Littorinidae, the winkles or periwinkles.

== Species ==
Species within the genus Afrolittorina include:

- Afrolittorina acutispira (E.A. Smith, 1892)
- Afrolittorina africana (Philippi, 1847)
- Afrolittorina knysnaensis (Philippi, 1847)
- Afrolittorina praetermissa (May, 1909)
