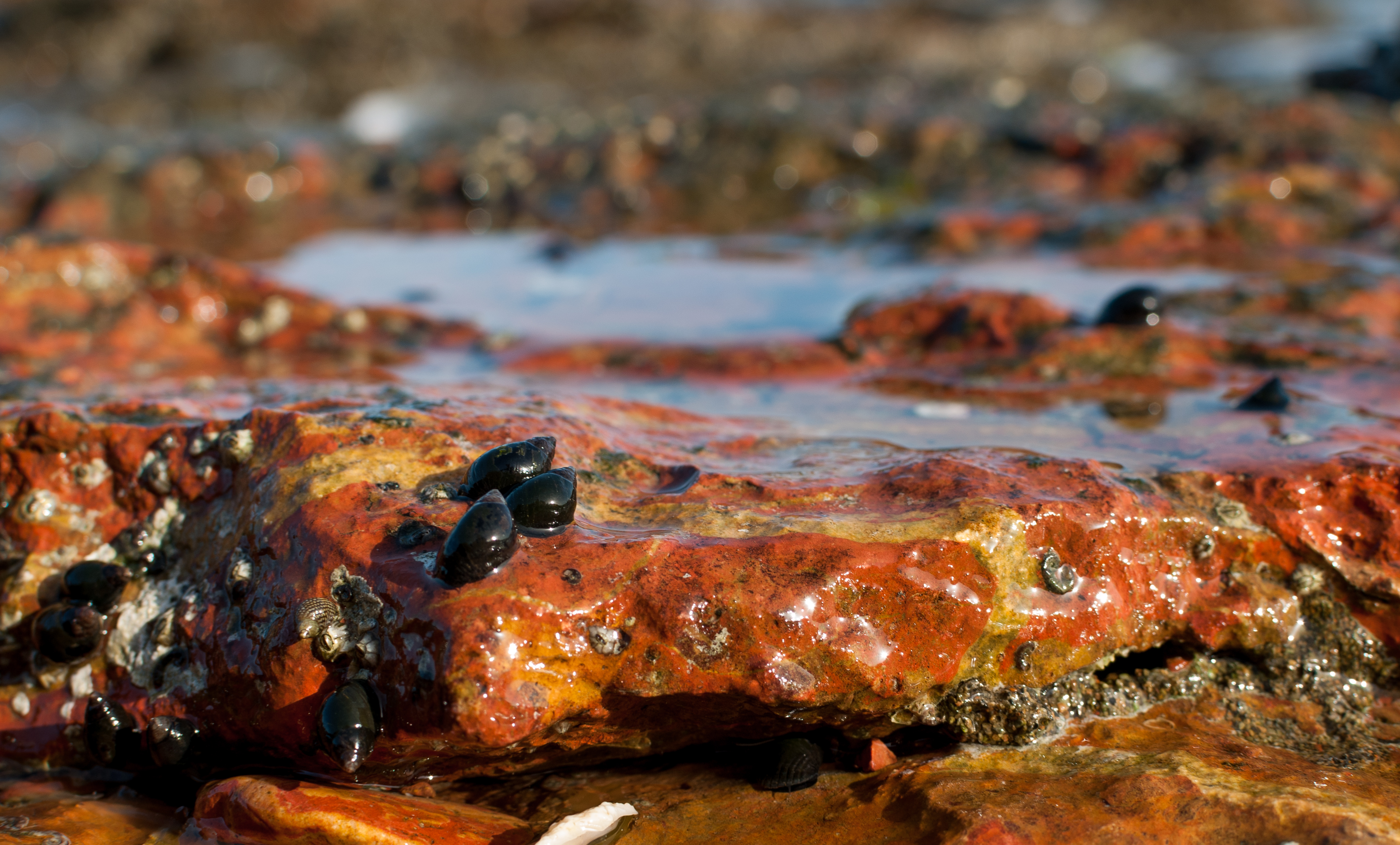
- Echinolittorina meleagris (Potiez & Michaud, 1838) in El Yaque Beach - Venezuela

Scientific classification
- Kingdom: Animalia
- Phylum: Mollusca
- Class: Gastropoda
- Subclass: Caenogastropoda
- Order: Littorinimorpha
- Family: Littorinidae
- Genus: Echinolittorina
- Species: E. meleagris

Binomial name
- Echinolittorina meleagris (Potiez & Michaud, 1838)

Synonyms
- Littorina meleagris (Potiez & Michaud, 1838); Nodilittorina meleagris (Potiez & Michaud, 1838)

= Echinolittorina meleagris =

Species of gastropod

Echinolittorina meleagris is a species of small sea snail, a marine gastropod mollusc in the family Littorinidae, the winkles or periwinkles.

== Description ==
The shell is oval and turritelada, much higher than wide, moderately thick and opaque, features 5 or 6 turns that increase rapidly in size and are convex with sutures well marked. The buelta body is 2/3 of the total height of the shell. The color pattern typicamente spotted large white spots separated by stripes mahogany very narrow or can be brown. The maximum recorded shell length is 10 mm.

== Distribution ==
The distribution of Echinolittorina meleagris, covers all Coast Caribbean, having been appointed in the Lesser Antilles, Belize, Colombia, Costa Rica, Cuba, Gulf of Mexico, Cayman Islands, Jamaica, Mexico, Panama, Puerto Rico and Venezuela.

== Habitat ==
It is a typical inhabitant of rocky coastline, which is located where the surf zone is usually large patch of hundreds of individuals. Minimum recorded depth is -1 m. Maximum recorded depth is 0 m.
