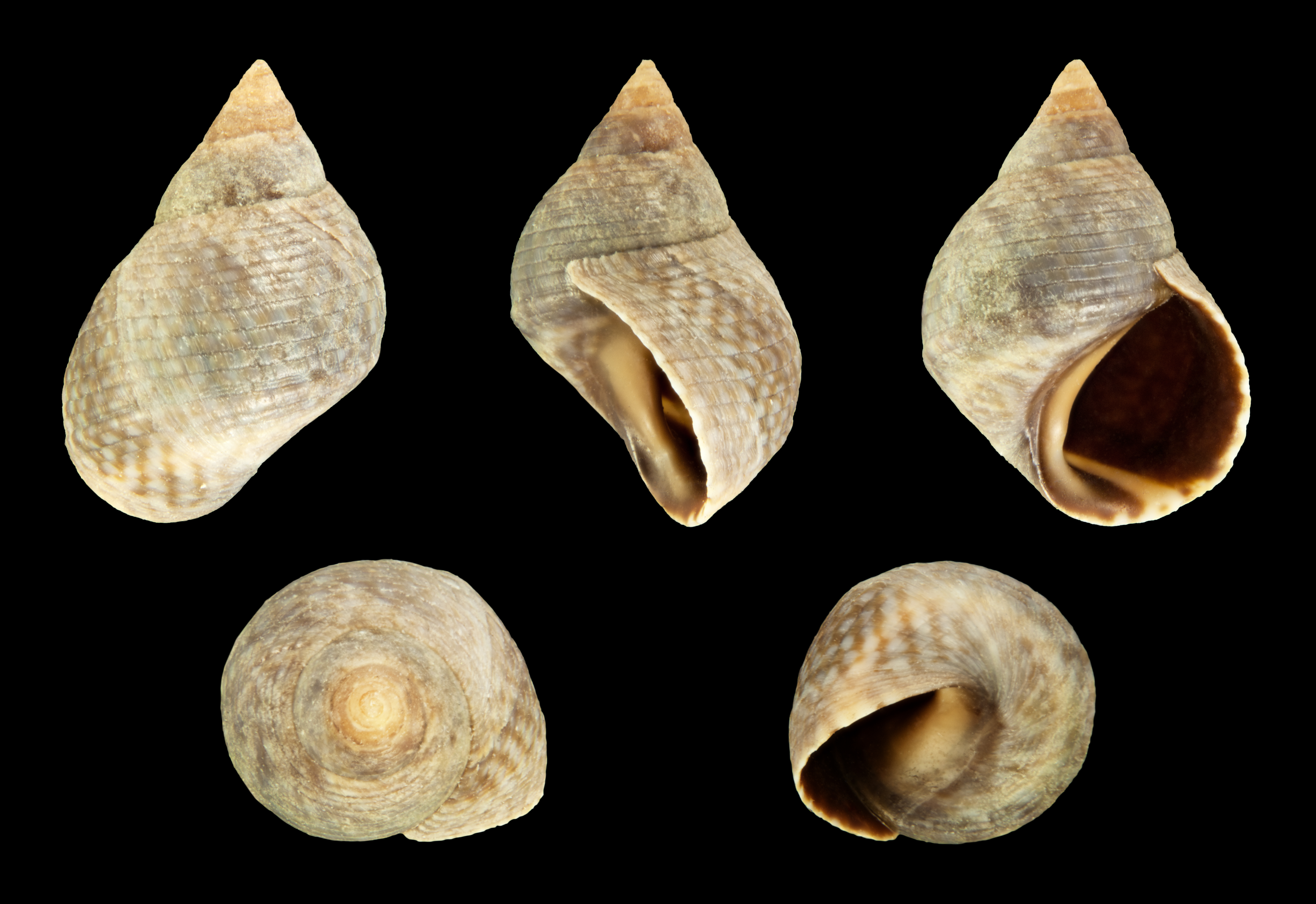

Scientific classification
- Kingdom: Animalia
- Phylum: Mollusca
- Class: Gastropoda
- Subclass: Caenogastropoda
- Order: Littorinimorpha
- Family: Littorinidae
- Genus: Echinolittorina
- Species: E. punctata

Binomial name
- Echinolittorina punctata (Gmelin, 1791)

Synonyms
- Littorina punctata Gmelin, 1791; Nodilittorina punctata (Gmelin, 1791)

= Echinolittorina punctata =

Species of gastropod

Echinolittorina punctata is a species of sea snail, a marine gastropod mollusc in the family Littorinidae, the winkles or periwinkles.
