= Mainwaringia =

Scientific classification
- Kingdom: Animalia
- Phylum: Mollusca
- Class: Gastropoda
- Subclass: Caenogastropoda
- Order: Littorinimorpha
- Family: Littorinidae
- Genus: Mainwaringia; Nevill, 1885

Genus of gastropods

Mainwaringia is a genus of sea snails or freshwater snails, marine gastropod mollusks in the family Littorinidae, the winkles or periwinkles.

== Species ==
Species within the genus Mainwaringia include:

- Mainwaringia leithii (E. A. Smith, 1876)
- Mainwaringia paludomoidea Nevill
- Mainwaringia rhizophila Reid, 1986
