= Echinolittorina subnodosa =

Scientific classification
- Kingdom: Animalia
- Phylum: Mollusca
- Class: Gastropoda
- Subclass: Caenogastropoda
- Order: Littorinimorpha
- Family: Littorinidae
- Genus: Echinolittorina
- Species: E. subnodosa

Binomial name
- Echinolittorina subnodosa (Philippi, 1847)

Synonyms
- Litorina subnodosa Phlippi, 1841; Nodilittorina subnodosa (Philippi, 1847)

Species of gastropod

Echinolittorina subnodosa is a species of sea snail, a marine gastropod mollusc in the family Littorinidae, the winkles or periwinkles.
