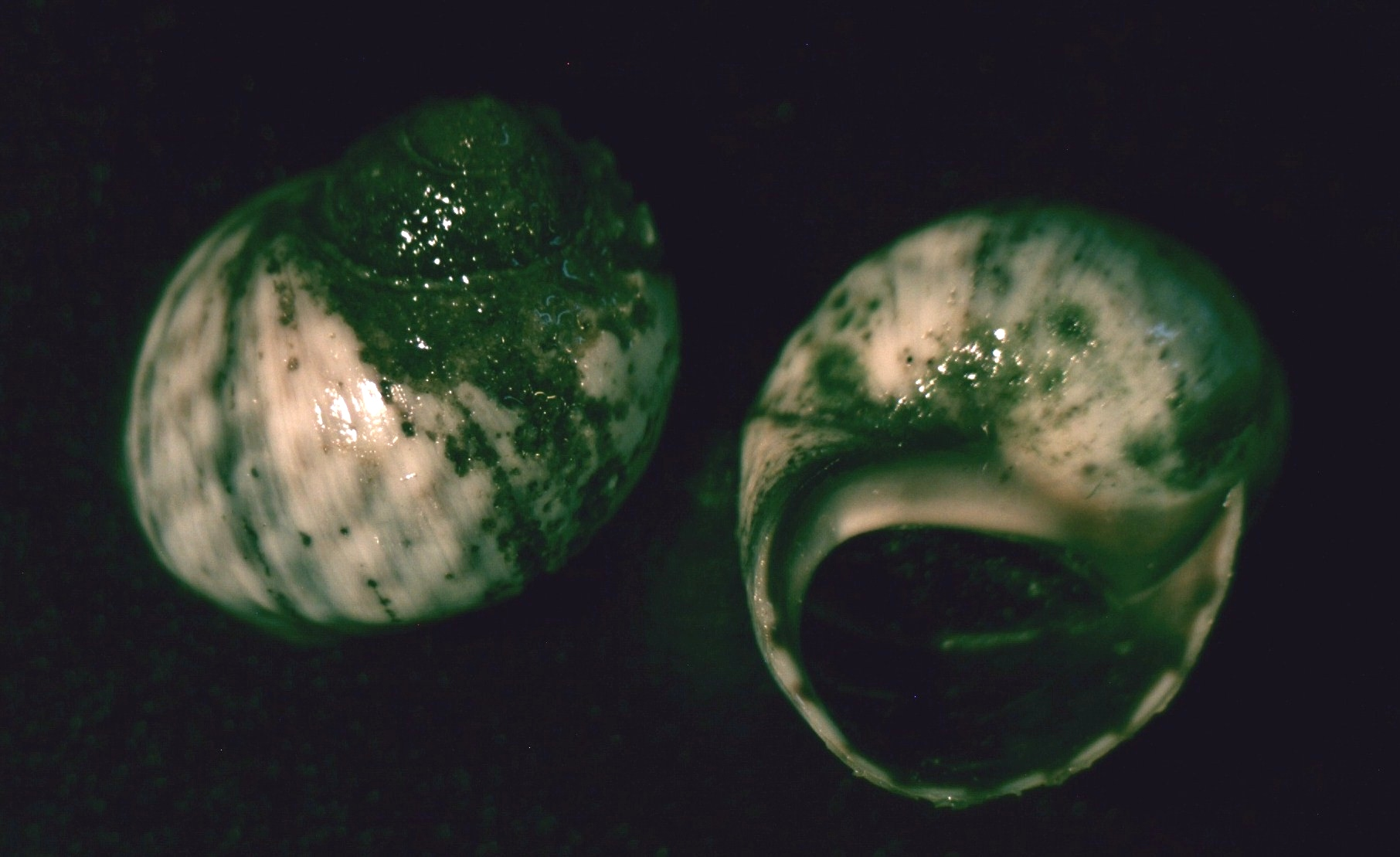
- Afrolittorina praetermissa

Scientific classification
- Kingdom: Animalia
- Phylum: Mollusca
- Class: Gastropoda
- Subclass: Caenogastropoda
- Order: Littorinimorpha
- Family: Littorinidae
- Genus: Afrolittorina
- Species: A. praetermissa

Binomial name
- Afrolittorina praetermissa (May, 1909)

Synonyms
- Echinolittorina praetermissa (May, 1909); Littorina praetermissa May, 1909

= Afrolittorina praetermissa =

Species of gastropod

Afrolittorina praetermissa is a species of sea snail, a marine gastropod mollusk in the family Littorinidae, the winkles or periwinkles.
