= Risellopsis =

Scientific classification
- Kingdom: Animalia
- Phylum: Mollusca
- Class: Gastropoda
- Subclass: Caenogastropoda
- Order: Littorinimorpha
- Family: Littorinidae
- Genus: Risellopsis; Kesteven, 1902

Genus of gastropods

Risellopsis is a genus of sea snails, marine gastropod mollusks in the family Littorinidae, the winkles or periwinkles.

== Species ==
Species within the genus Risellopsis include:

- Risellopsis mutabilis May, 1909
- Risellopsis varia (Hutton, 1873)
