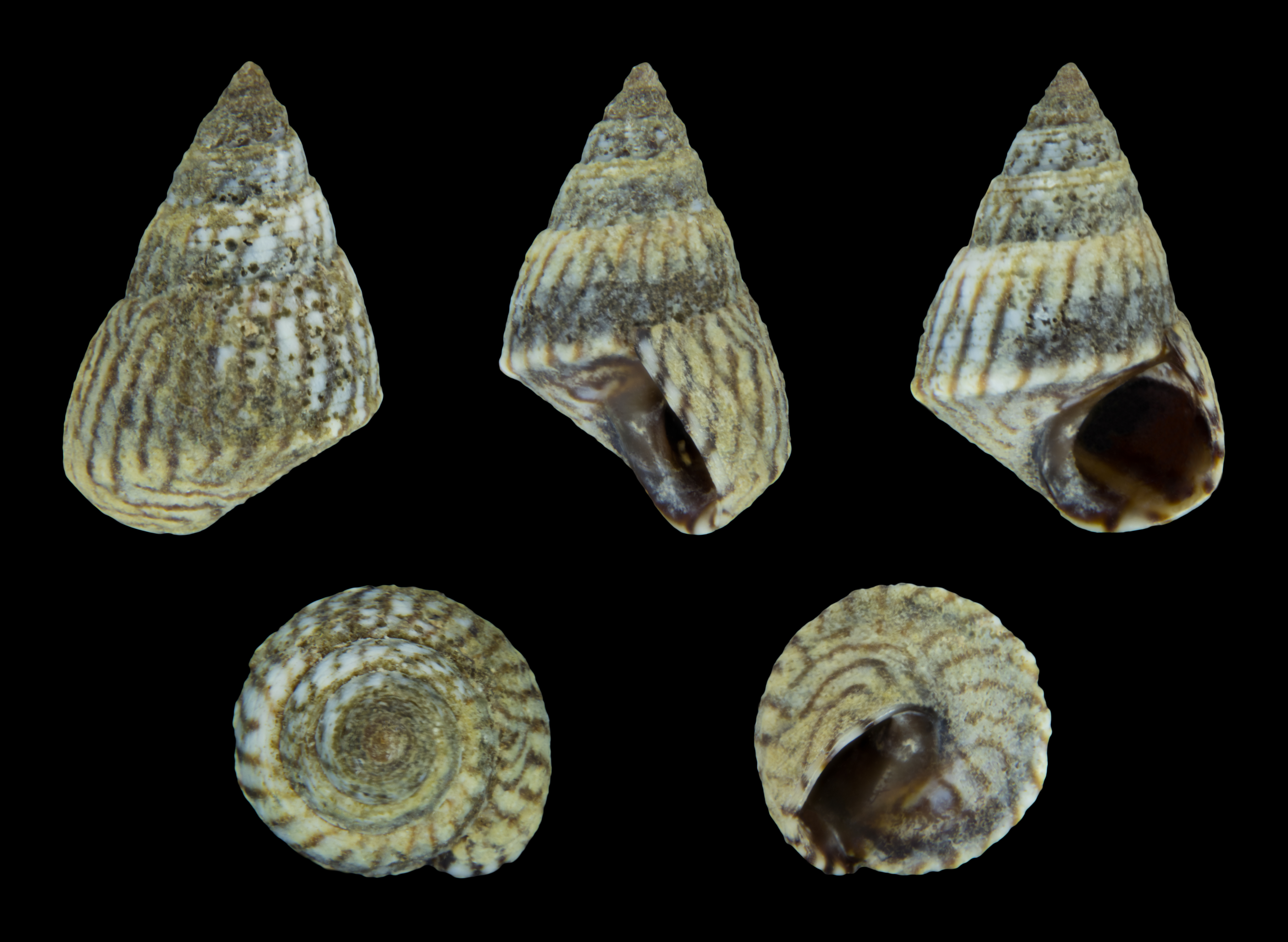

Scientific classification
- Kingdom: Animalia
- Phylum: Mollusca
- Class: Gastropoda
- Subclass: Caenogastropoda
- Order: Littorinimorpha
- Family: Littorinidae
- Genus: Echinolittorina
- Species: E. lineolata

Binomial name
- Echinolittorina lineolata (d'Orbigny, 1840)

= Echinolittorina lineolata =

Species of gastropod

Echinolittorina lineolata is a species of small sea snail, a marine gastropod mollusc in the family Littorinidae, the winkles or periwinkles.

== Description ==
The maximum recorded shell length is 10 mm.

== Habitat ==
Minimum recorded depth is 0 m. Maximum recorded depth is 0 m.
