= Echinolittorina dilatata =

Scientific classification
- Kingdom: Animalia
- Phylum: Mollusca
- Class: Gastropoda
- Subclass: Caenogastropoda
- Order: Littorinimorpha
- Family: Littorinidae
- Genus: Echinolittorina
- Species: E. dilatata

Binomial name
- Echinolittorina dilatata (d'Orbigny, 1842)

Synonyms
- Littorina dilatata d'Orbigny, 1842

Species of gastropod

Echinolittorina dilatata is a species of sea snail, a marine gastropod mollusc in the family Littorinidae, the winkles or periwinkles.
