= Echinolittorina fuscolineata =

Scientific classification
- Kingdom: Animalia
- Phylum: Mollusca
- Class: Gastropoda
- Subclass: Caenogastropoda
- Order: Littorinimorpha
- Family: Littorinidae
- Genus: Echinolittorina
- Species: E. fuscolineata

Binomial name
- Echinolittorina fuscolineata (Reid, 2002)

Synonyms
- Nodilittorina fuscolineata Reid, 2002

Species of gastropod

Echinolittorina fuscolineata is a species of sea snail, a marine gastropod mollusk in the family Littorinidae, the winkles or periwinkles.
