= Echinolittorina sundaica =

Scientific classification
- Kingdom: Animalia
- Phylum: Mollusca
- Class: Gastropoda
- Subclass: Caenogastropoda
- Order: Littorinimorpha
- Family: Littorinidae
- Genus: Echinolittorina
- Species: E. sundaica

Binomial name
- Echinolittorina sundaica (van Regteren Altena, 1945)

Synonyms
- Littorina sundaica van Regteren Altena, 1945

Species of gastropod

Echinolittorina sundaica is a species of sea snail, a marine gastropod mollusc in the family Littorinidae, the winkles or periwinkles.
