= Echinolittorina australis =

Scientific classification
- Kingdom: Animalia
- Phylum: Mollusca
- Class: Gastropoda
- Subclass: Caenogastropoda
- Order: Littorinimorpha
- Family: Littorinidae
- Genus: Echinolittorina
- Species: E. australis

Binomial name
- Echinolittorina australis (Gray, 1826)

Synonyms
- Litorina rugosa Menke, 1843; Littorina australis Gray, 1826; Littorina nodosa Gray, 1839

Species of gastropod

Echinolittorina australis is a species of sea snail, a marine gastropod mollusk in the family Littorinidae, the winkles or periwinkles.
