= Echinolittorina helenae =

Scientific classification
- Kingdom: Animalia
- Phylum: Mollusca
- Class: Gastropoda
- Subclass: Caenogastropoda
- Order: Littorinimorpha
- Family: Littorinidae
- Genus: Echinolittorina
- Species: E. helenae

Binomial name
- Echinolittorina helenae (E.A. Smith, 1890)

Synonyms
- Littorina helenae E.A. Smith, 1890

Species of gastropod

Echinolittorina helenae is a species of sea snail, a marine gastropod mollusc in the family Littorinidae, the winkles or periwinkles.
