= Echinolittorina aspera =

Scientific classification
- Kingdom: Animalia
- Phylum: Mollusca
- Class: Gastropoda
- Subclass: Caenogastropoda
- Order: Littorinimorpha
- Family: Littorinidae
- Genus: Echinolittorina
- Species: E. aspera

Binomial name
- Echinolittorina aspera (Philippi, 1846)

Synonyms
- Littorina aspera Philippi, 1846; Nodilittorina aspera (Philippi, 1846)

Species of gastropod

Echinolittorina aspera is a species of sea snail, a marine gastropod mollusc in the family Littorinidae, the winkles or periwinkles.
