= Echinolittorina tenuistriata =

Scientific classification
- Kingdom: Animalia
- Phylum: Mollusca
- Class: Gastropoda
- Subclass: Caenogastropoda
- Order: Littorinimorpha
- Family: Littorinidae
- Genus: Echinolittorina
- Species: E. tenuistriata

Binomial name
- Echinolittorina tenuistriata (Reid, 2002)

Synonyms
- Nodilittorina tenuistriata Reid, 2002

Species of gastropod

Echinolittorina tenuistriata is a species of sea snail, a marine gastropod mollusc in the family Littorinidae, the winkles or periwinkles.
