= Echinolittorina angustior =

Scientific classification
- Kingdom: Animalia
- Phylum: Mollusca
- Class: Gastropoda
- Subclass: Caenogastropoda
- Order: Littorinimorpha
- Family: Littorinidae
- Genus: Echinolittorina
- Species: E. angustior

Binomial name
- Echinolittorina angustior (Mörch, 1876)

Synonyms
- Littorina angustior Mörch, 1876

Species of gastropod

Echinolittorina angustior is a species of sea snail, a marine gastropod mollusc in the family Littorinidae, the winkles or periwinkles.

== Description ==
The maximum recorded shell length is 17 mm.

== Habitat ==
Minimum recorded depth is 0 m. Maximum recorded depth is 0 m.
