= Echinolittorina ziczac =

- Echinolittorina ziczac

Scientific classification
- Kingdom: Animalia
- Phylum: Mollusca
- Class: Gastropoda
- Subclass: Caenogastropoda
- Order: Littorinimorpha
- Family: Littorinidae
- Genus: Echinolittorina
- Species: E. ziczac

Binomial name
- Echinolittorina ziczac (Gmelin, 1791)

Species of mollusc

Echinolittorina ziczac, previously known as Littorina ziczac, common name the "zebra periwinkle", is a species of small sea snail, a marine gastropod mollusc in the family Littorinidae.

This species lives in the tropical Western Atlantic Ocean, from Florida to Barbados, including the Caribbean coast of Central America. It is very common on intertidal rocks.

== Description ==
The maximum recorded shell length is 23 mm.

== Habitat ==
Minimum recorded depth is -3 m. Maximum recorded depth is 0 m.
