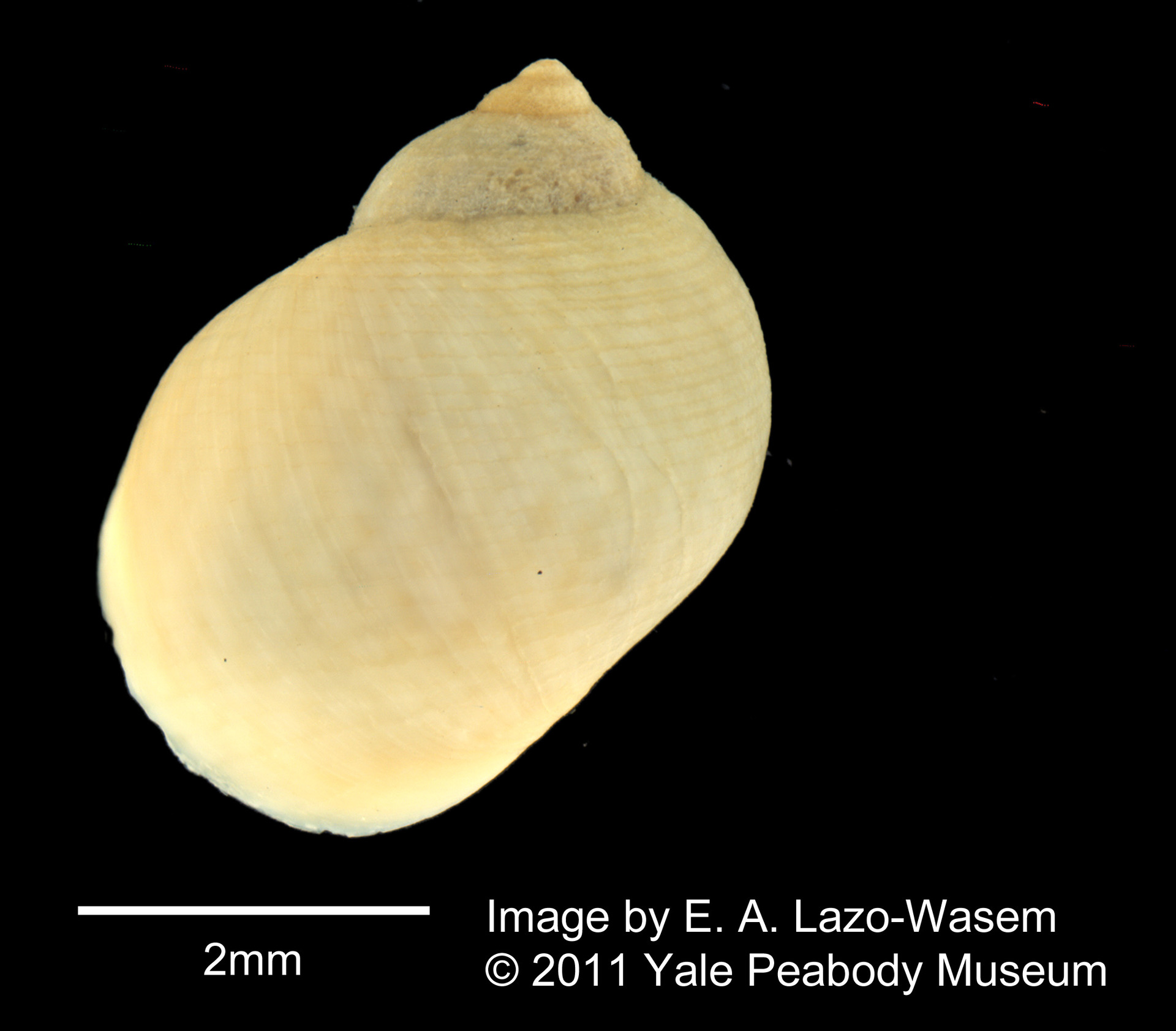

Scientific classification
- Kingdom: Animalia
- Phylum: Mollusca
- Class: Gastropoda
- Subclass: Caenogastropoda
- Order: Littorinimorpha
- Family: Littorinidae
- Genus: Echinolittorina
- Species: E. vidua

Binomial name
- Echinolittorina vidua (Gould, 1859)

Synonyms
- Granulilittorina philippiana Habe & Kosuge, 1966; Litorina scabra var. ventricosa Philippi, 1847; Littorina ventricosa Philippi, 1847; Littorina vidua Gould, 1859; Littorina-capsula hagruma Tokioka & Habe, 1953; Nodilittorina vidua (Gould, 1859)

= Echinolittorina vidua =

Species of gastropod

Echinolittorina vidua is a species of sea snail, a marine gastropod mollusc in the family Littorinidae, the winkles or periwinkles.
