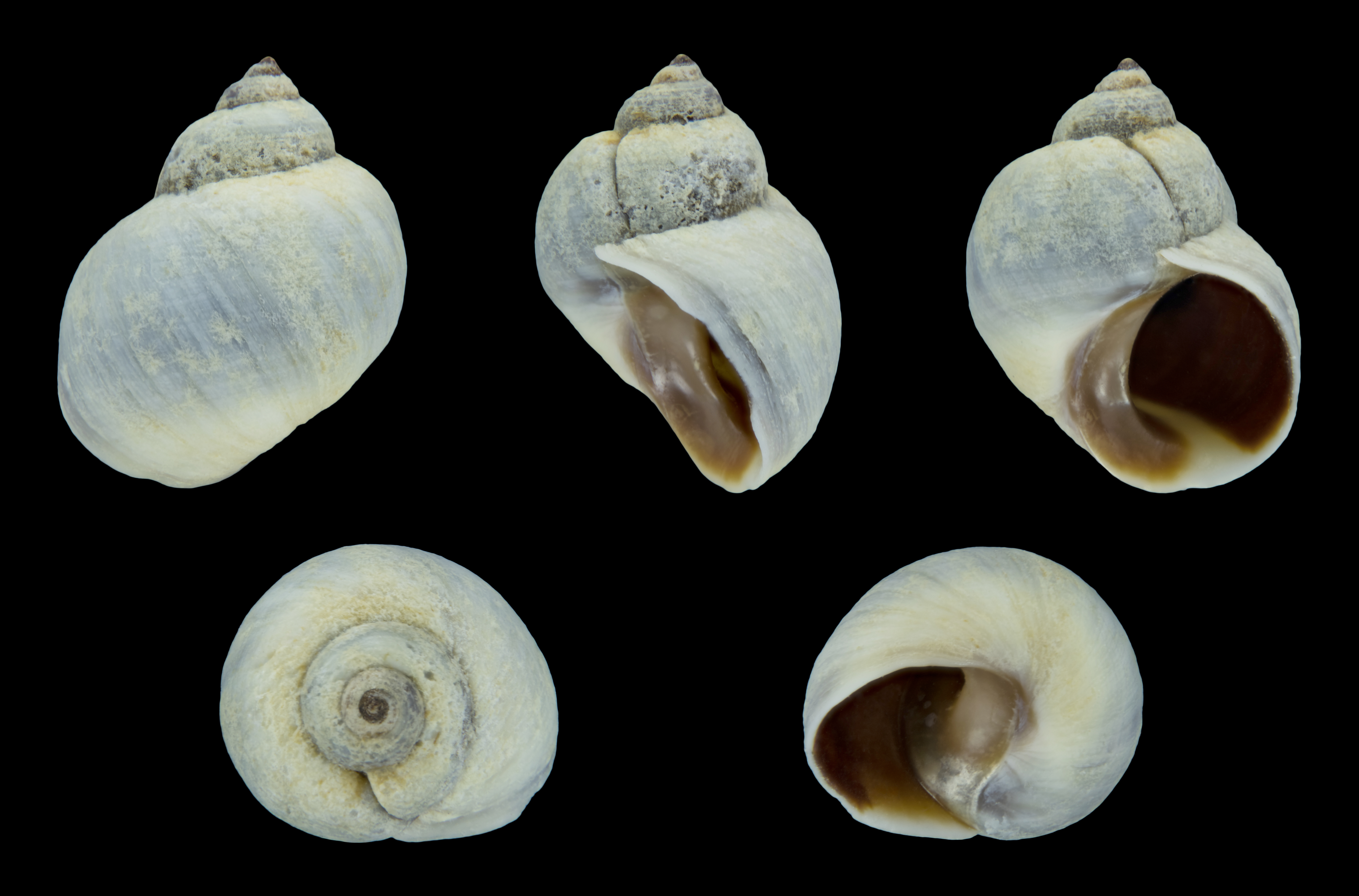

Scientific classification
- Kingdom: Animalia
- Phylum: Mollusca
- Class: Gastropoda
- Subclass: Caenogastropoda
- Order: Littorinimorpha
- Family: Littorinidae
- Genus: Afrolittorina
- Species: A. africana

Binomial name
- Afrolittorina africana (Philippi, 1847)

Synonyms
- Echinolittorina africana (Philippi, 1847); Litorina africana Philippi, 1847; Litorina decollata Philippi, 1847; Littorina africana (Philippi, 1847); Littorina perplexa Turton, 1932; Nodilittorina africana (Philippi, 1847)

= Afrolittorina africana =

Species of sea snail

Afrolittorina africana is a species of sea snail, a marine gastropod mollusk in the family Littorinidae, the winkles or periwinkles.

== Distribution ==
East coast of Africa south to and including KwaZulu-Natal.
