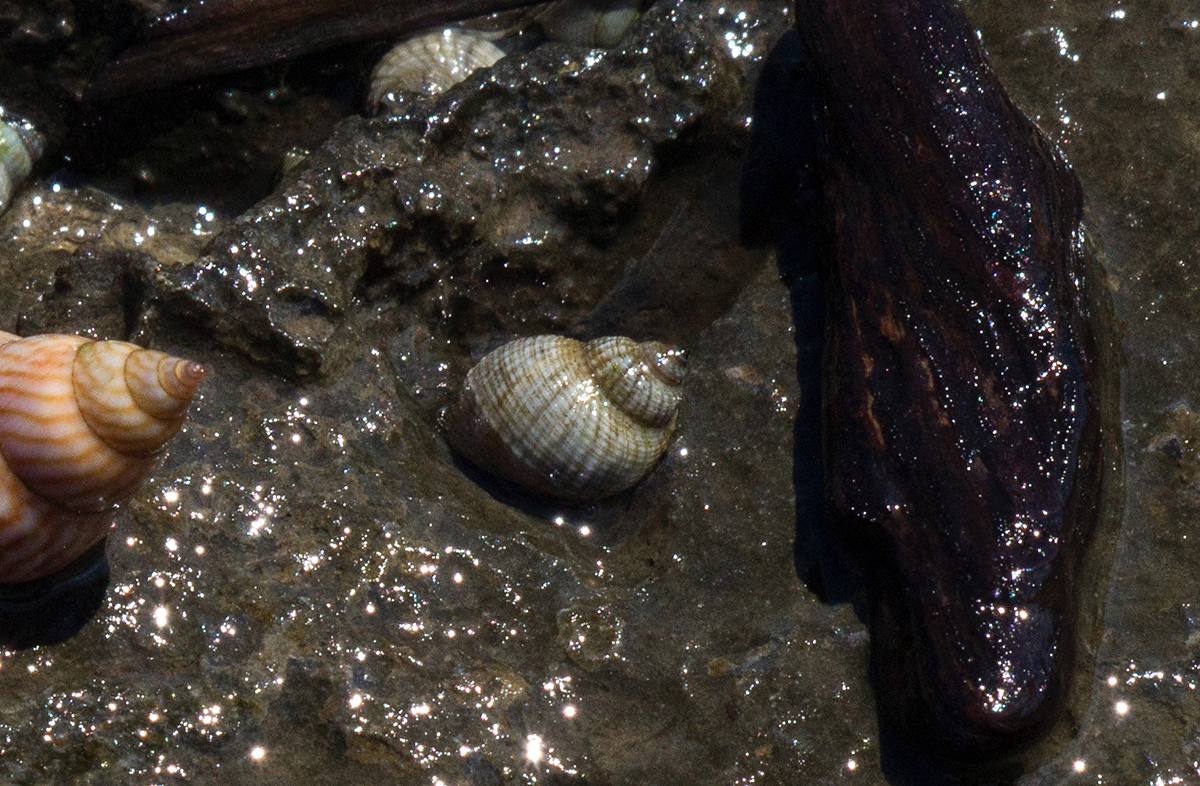
- Echinolittorina millegrana

Scientific classification
- Kingdom: Animalia
- Phylum: Mollusca
- Class: Gastropoda
- Subclass: Caenogastropoda
- Order: Littorinimorpha
- Family: Littorinidae
- Genus: Echinolittorina
- Species: E. millegrana

Binomial name
- Echinolittorina millegrana (Philippi, 1848)

Synonyms
- Litorina millegrana Philippi, 1848; Littorina millegrana (Phillipi, 1848); Littorina urieli Biggs, 1966; Nodilittorina millegrana (Philippi, 1848)

= Echinolittorina millegrana =

Species of gastropod

Echinolittorina millegrana is a species of sea snail, a marine gastropod mollusc in the family Littorinidae, the winkles or periwinkles.
