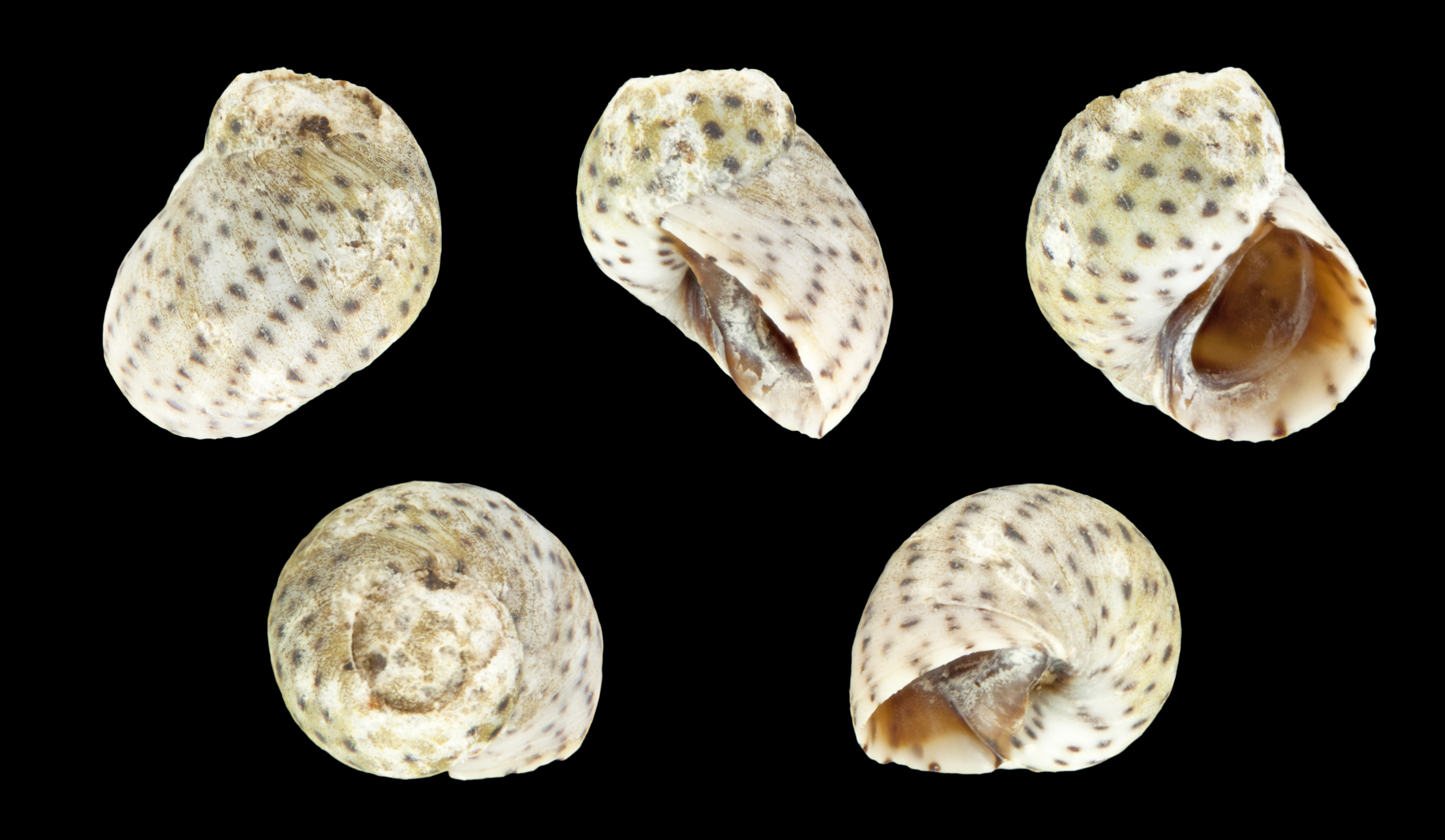
- Echinolittorina mespillum var. minima

Scientific classification
- Kingdom: Animalia
- Phylum: Mollusca
- Class: Gastropoda
- Subclass: Caenogastropoda
- Order: Littorinimorpha
- Family: Littorinidae
- Genus: Echinolittorina
- Species: E. mespillum

Binomial name
- Echinolittorina mespillum (Mühlfeld, 1824)

Synonyms
- Litorina mespillum Mühlfeld, 1824; Nodilittorina mespillum (Mühlfeld, 1824)

= Echinolittorina mespillum =

Species of gastropod

Echinolittorina mespillum is a species of sea snail, a marine gastropod mollusc in the family Littorinidae, the winkles or periwinkles.

== Distribution ==
Aruba, Bonaire, Caribbean Sea, Cayman Islands, Colombia, Cuba, Curaçao, Gulf of Mexico, Jamaica, Lesser Antilles, Mexico, Puerto Rico

== Description ==
The maximum recorded shell length is 10 mm.

== Habitat ==
Minimum recorded depth is −2 m. Maximum recorded depth is 0 m.
