= Echinolittorina natalensis =

Scientific classification
- Kingdom: Animalia
- Phylum: Mollusca
- Class: Gastropoda
- Subclass: Caenogastropoda
- Order: Littorinimorpha
- Family: Littorinidae
- Genus: Echinolittorina
- Species: E. natalensis

Binomial name
- Echinolittorina natalensis (Philippi, 1847)

Synonyms
- Litorina natalensis Krauss in Philippi, 1847; Nodilittorina natalensis (Philippi, 1847); Tectarius natalensis (Philippi, 1847)

Species of gastropod

Echinolittorina natalensis is a species of sea snail, a marine gastropod mollusc in the family Littorinidae, the winkles or periwinkles.
