= Echinolittorina vermeiji =

Scientific classification
- Kingdom: Animalia
- Phylum: Mollusca
- Class: Gastropoda
- Subclass: Caenogastropoda
- Order: Littorinimorpha
- Family: Littorinidae
- Genus: Echinolittorina
- Species: E. vermeiji

Binomial name
- Echinolittorina vermeiji (Bandel & Kadolsky, 1982)

Synonyms
- Nodilittorina vermeiji Bandel & Kadolsky, 1982

Species of gastropod

Echinolittorina vermeiji is a species of sea snail, a marine gastropod mollusc in the family Littorinidae, the winkles or periwinkles.
