= Echinolittorina feejeensis =

Scientific classification
- Kingdom: Animalia
- Phylum: Mollusca
- Class: Gastropoda
- Subclass: Caenogastropoda
- Order: Littorinimorpha
- Family: Littorinidae
- Genus: Echinolittorina
- Species: E. feejeensis

Binomial name
- Echinolittorina feejeensis (Reeve, 1857)

Synonyms
- Litorina vitensis Dunker, 1871; Litorina vitiensis Martens & Langkavel, 1871; Littorina feejeensis Reeve, 1857; Littorina miliaris var. fijiensis Nevill, 1885; Littorina vitiensis Godeffroy, 1874; Nodilittorina feejeensis (Reeve, 1857); Tectarius feejeensis (Reeve, 1857)

Species of gastropod

Echinolittorina feejeensis is a species of sea snail, a marine gastropod mollusk in the family Littorinidae, the winkles or periwinkles.
