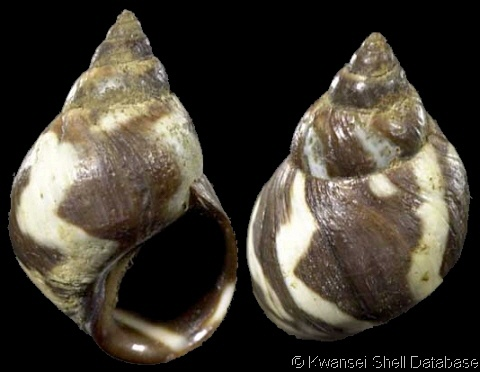

Scientific classification
- Kingdom: Animalia
- Phylum: Mollusca
- Class: Gastropoda
- Subclass: Caenogastropoda
- Order: Littorinimorpha
- Family: Littorinidae
- Genus: Echinolittorina
- Species: E. peruviana

Binomial name
- Echinolittorina peruviana (Lamarck, 1822)

Synonyms
- Littorina peruviana (Lamarck, 1822); Litorina zebra (Wood, 1828); Littorina zebra Donovan, 1825; Littorina zebra var. nana Nevill, 1885; Nodilittorina peruviana (Lamarck, 1822); Phasianella peruviana Lamarck, 1822; Turbo zebra Wood, 1828

= Echinolittorina peruviana =

Species of gastropod

Echinolittorina peruviana is a species of sea snail, a marine gastropod mollusc in the family Littorinidae, the winkles or periwinkles.
