= Echinolittorina modesta =

- Echinolittorina modesta shells

Scientific classification
- Kingdom: Animalia
- Phylum: Mollusca
- Class: Gastropoda
- Subclass: Caenogastropoda
- Order: Littorinimorpha
- Family: Littorinidae
- Genus: Echinolittorina
- Species: E. modesta

Binomial name
- Echinolittorina modesta (Philippi, 1846)

Synonyms
- Littorina modesta Philippi, 1846; Littorina philippii var. alba Martens, 1900; Nodilittorina modesta (Philippi, 1846)

Species of gastropod

Echinolittorina modesta is a species of sea snail, a marine gastropod mollusc in the family Littorinidae, the winkles or periwinkles.
