= Echinolittorina granosa =

Scientific classification
- Kingdom: Animalia
- Phylum: Mollusca
- Class: Gastropoda
- Subclass: Caenogastropoda
- Order: Littorinimorpha
- Family: Littorinidae
- Genus: Echinolittorina
- Species: E. granosa

Binomial name
- Echinolittorina granosa (Philippi, 1845)

Synonyms
- Echinolittorina (Echinolittorina) granosa (Philippi, 1845); Litorina granosa Philippi, 1848; Littorina glans Reeve, 1857; Nodilittorina granosa (Philippi, 1845) (recombination); Tectarius granosus (Philippi, 1845); Turbo granosus Philippi, 1845

Species of gastropod

Echinolittorina granosa is a species of sea snail, a marine gastropod mollusk in the family Littorinidae, the winkles or periwinkles.

== Distribution ==
This species occurs in the Atlantic Ocean off Gabon.
