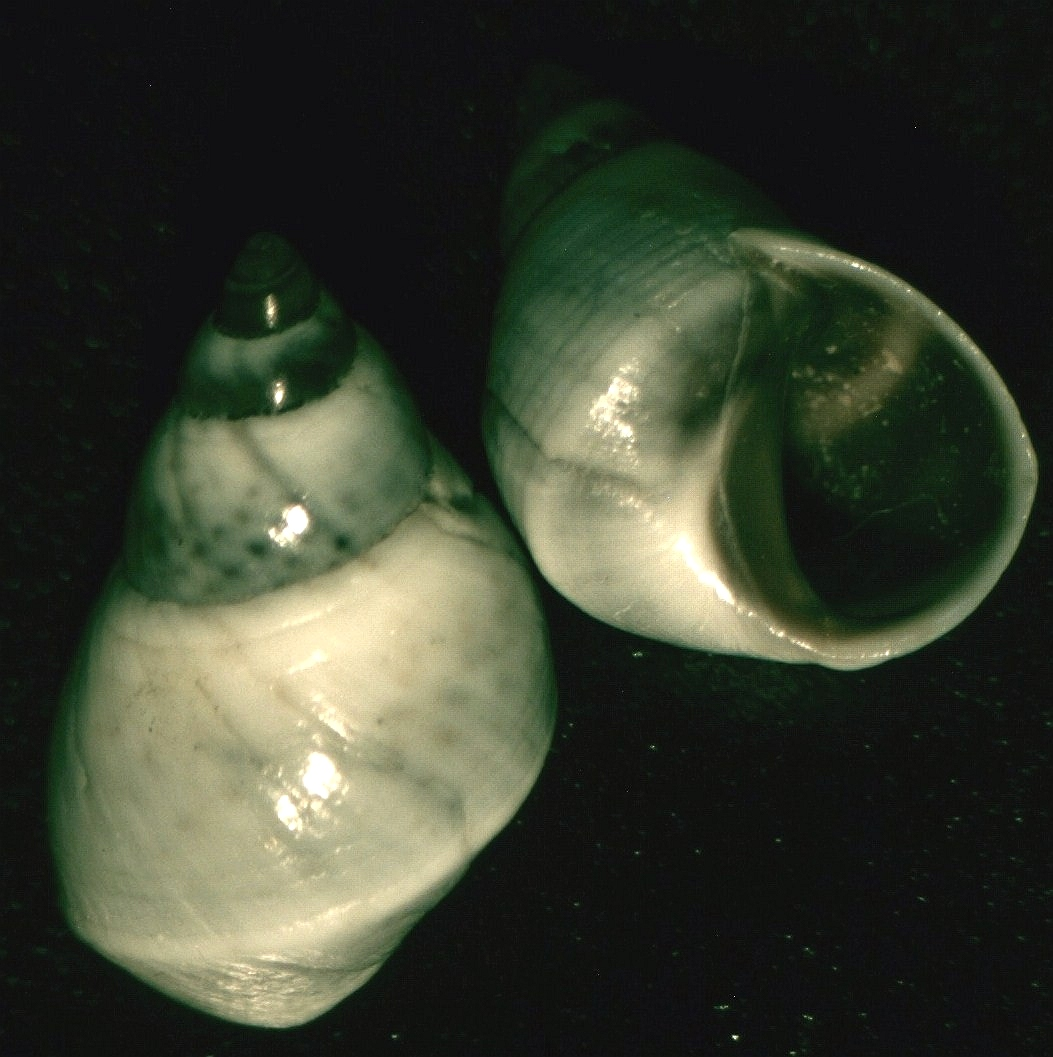

Scientific classification
- Kingdom: Animalia
- Phylum: Mollusca
- Class: Gastropoda
- Subclass: Caenogastropoda
- Order: Littorinimorpha
- Family: Littorinidae
- Genus: Echinolittorina
- Species: E. paytensis

Binomial name
- Echinolittorina paytensis (Philippi, 1847)

Synonyms
- Littorina paytensis Philippi, 1847; Nodilittorina paytensis (Philippi, 1847)

= Echinolittorina paytensis =

Species of gastropod

Echinolittorina paytensis is a species of sea snail, a marine gastropod mollusc in the family Littorinidae, the winkles or periwinkles.
