= Pellilitorina =

Scientific classification
- Kingdom: Animalia
- Phylum: Mollusca
- Class: Gastropoda
- Subclass: Caenogastropoda
- Order: Littorinimorpha
- Family: Littorinidae
- Subfamily: Lacuninae
- Genus: Pellilitorina; Pfeffer in Martens & Pfeffer, 1886

Genus of gastropods

Pellilitorina is a genus of sea snails, marine gastropod molluscs in the family Littorinidae, the winkles or periwinkles.

== Species ==
Species within the genus Pellilitorina include:

- Pellilitorina pellita (Martens, 1885)
- Pellilitorina setosa (E.A. Smith, 1875)
