= Echinolittorina dubiosa =

Scientific classification
- Kingdom: Animalia
- Phylum: Mollusca
- Class: Gastropoda
- Subclass: Caenogastropoda
- Order: Littorinimorpha
- Family: Littorinidae
- Genus: Echinolittorina
- Species: E. dubiosa

Binomial name
- Echinolittorina dubiosa (C.B. Adams, 1852)

Synonyms
- Littorina dubiosa C.B. Adams, 1852; Nodilittorina dubiosa (C.B. Adams, 1852)

Species of gastropod

Echinolittorina dubiosa is a species of sea snail, a marine gastropod mollusk in the family Littorinidae, the winkles or periwinkles.
