= Echinolittorina lemniscata =

Scientific classification
- Kingdom: Animalia
- Phylum: Mollusca
- Class: Gastropoda
- Subclass: Caenogastropoda
- Order: Littorinimorpha
- Family: Littorinidae
- Genus: Echinolittorina
- Species: E. lemniscata

Binomial name
- Echinolittorina lemniscata (Philippi, 1846)

Synonyms
- Echinolittorina galapagiensis (Stearns, 1892); Littorina atyphus Stearns, 1892; Littorina galapagiensis Stearns, 1892; Littorina lemniscata Philippi, 1846; Nodilittorina galapagiensis (Stearns, 1892)

Species of gastropod

Echinolittorina lemniscata is a species of sea snail, a marine gastropod mollusc in the family Littorinidae, the winkles or periwinkles.

== Description ==
The shell size varies between 6 mm and 10 mm.

== Distribution ==
This species is distributed in the Pacific Ocean along the Galapagos Islands
