= Echinolittorina atrata =

Scientific classification
- Kingdom: Animalia
- Phylum: Mollusca
- Class: Gastropoda
- Subclass: Caenogastropoda
- Order: Littorinimorpha
- Family: Littorinidae
- Genus: Echinolittorina
- Species: E. atrata

Binomial name
- Echinolittorina atrata (C.B. Adams, 1852)

Synonyms
- Adeorbis abjecta C.B. Adams, 1852; Littorina atrata C.B. Adams, 1852; Littorina excavata C.B. Adams, 1852; Nodilittorina atrata (C.B. Adams, 1852)

Species of gastropod

Echinolittorina atrata is a species of sea snail, a marine gastropod mollusc in the family Littorinidae, the winkles or periwinkles.
