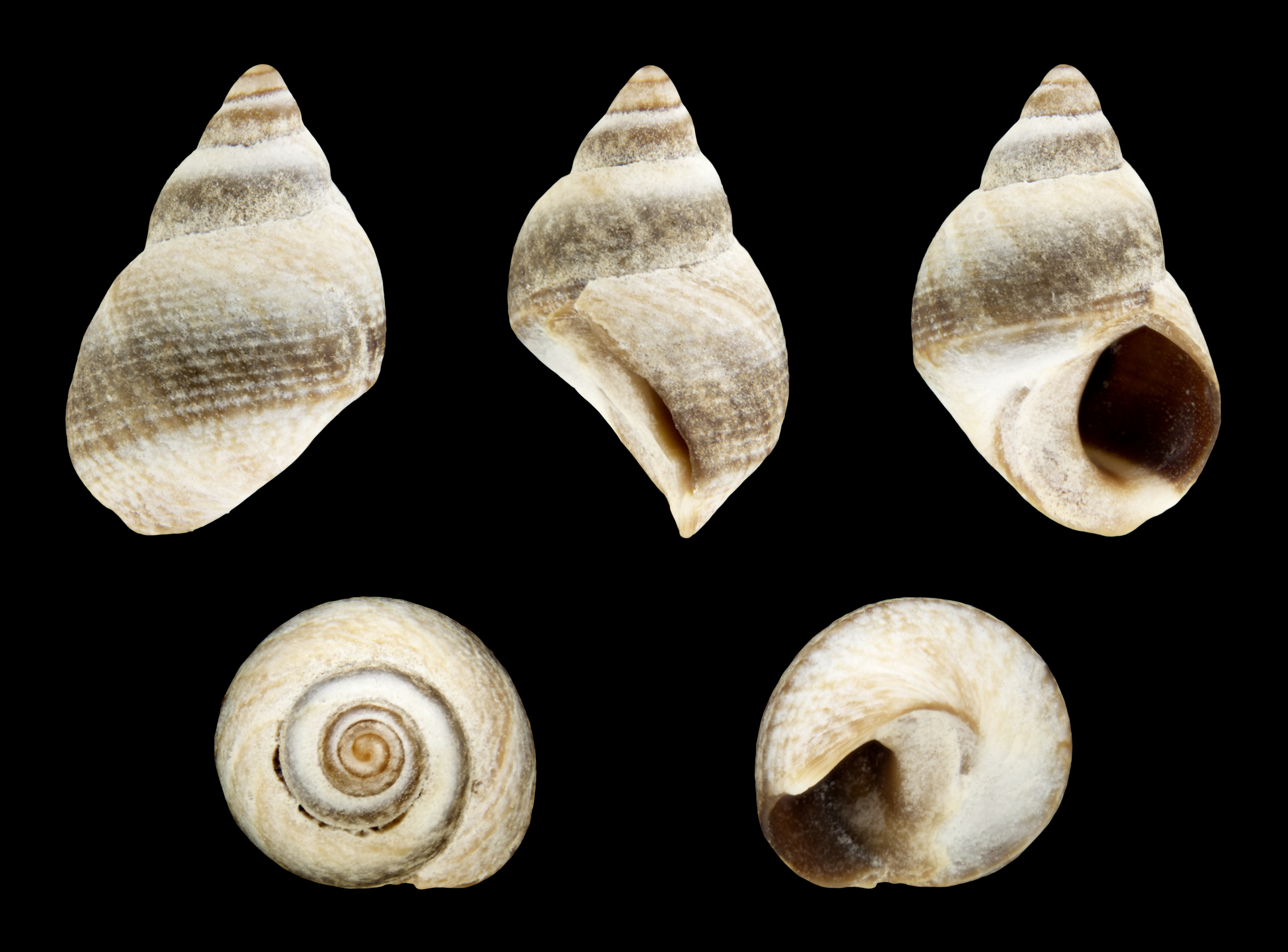
- A shell of Afrolittorina knisnaensis

Scientific classification
- Kingdom: Animalia
- Phylum: Mollusca
- Class: Gastropoda
- Subclass: Caenogastropoda
- Order: Littorinimorpha
- Family: Littorinidae
- Genus: Afrolittorina
- Species: A. knysnaensis

Binomial name
- Afrolittorina knysnaensis (Philippi, 1847)

Synonyms
- Afrolittorina africana tryphena Bartsch, 1915; Litorina africana tryphena Bartsch, 1915; Litorina knysnaensis Krauss in Philippi, 1847; Littorina africana pica Turton, 1932; Littorina indistincta Turton, 1932; Littorina knysnaensis Philippi, 1847; Littorina kowiensis Turton, 1932; Littorina picea Reeve, 1857; Littorina rietensis Turton, 1932; Nodilittorina indistincta Turton, 1932; Nodilittorina knysnaensis (Krauss in Philippi, 1847); Nodilittorina kowiensis Turton, 1932; Nodilittorina picea Reeve, 1857; Nodilittorina rietensis Turton, 1932

= Afrolittorina knysnaensis =

Species of gastropod

Afrolittorina knysnaensis, common name the southern periwinkle, is a species of sea snail, a marine gastropod mollusk in the family Littorinidae, the winkles or periwinkles.

== Description ==
The size of the shell varies between 9 mm and 15 mm. Its color varies from brown with a pattern of dots with a dark ring around its every whorl, to pure black. The smooth shell has a conical shape with a short spire. The aperture is subcircular and has a transparent, horny operculum.

== Distribution ==
This marine species occurs off Namibia to Southern KwaZuluNatal; in the Indian Ocean off Réunion.
