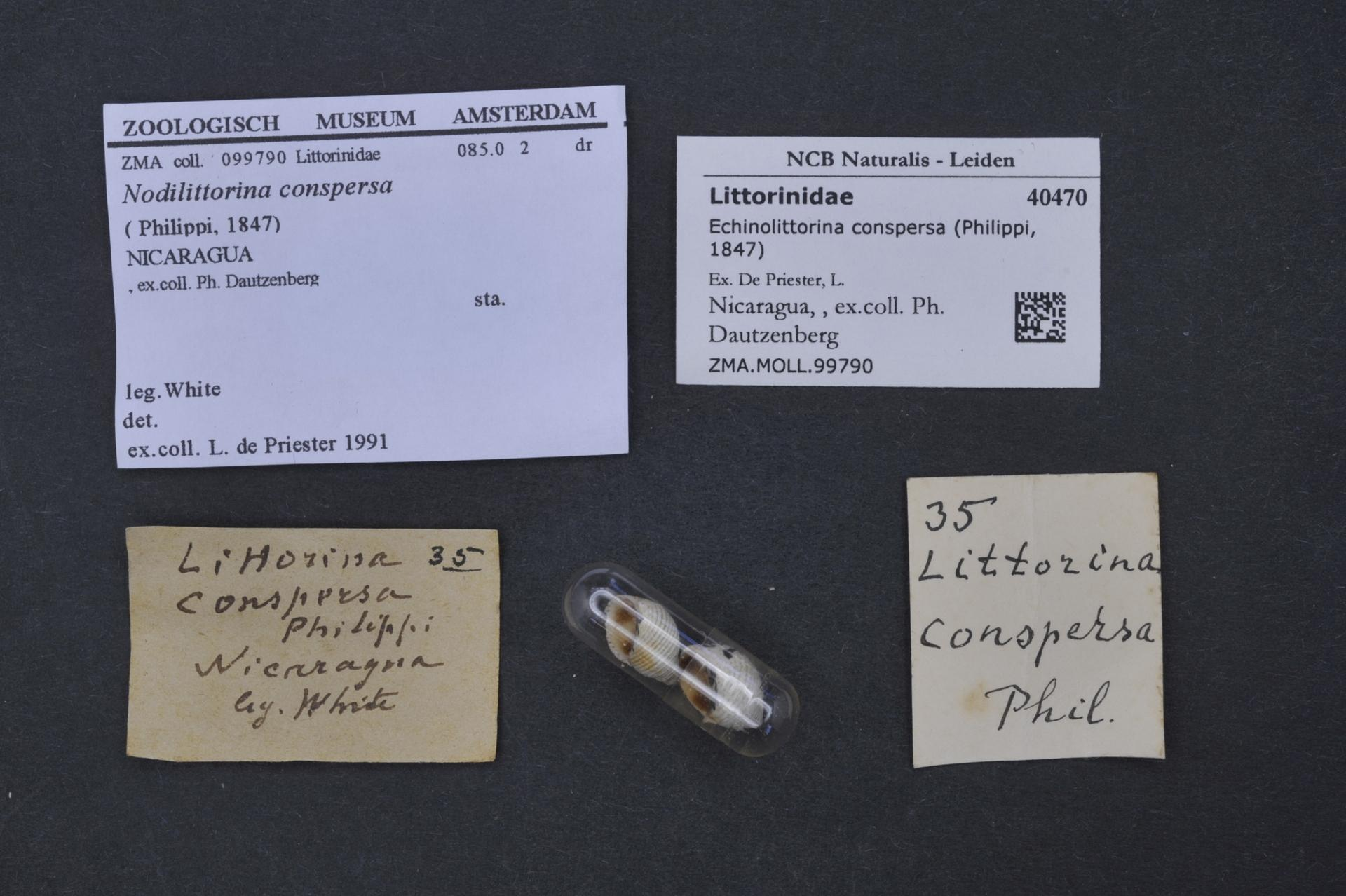

Scientific classification
- Kingdom: Animalia
- Phylum: Mollusca
- Class: Gastropoda
- Subclass: Caenogastropoda
- Order: Littorinimorpha
- Family: Littorinidae
- Genus: Echinolittorina
- Species: E. conspersa

Binomial name
- Echinolittorina conspersa (Philippi, 1847)

Synonyms
- Litorina conspersa Philippi, 1847; Littorina puncticulata Philippi, 1847; Nodilittorina conspersa (Philippi, 1847)

= Echinolittorina conspersa =

Species of gastropod

Echinolittorina conspersa is a species of sea snail, a marine gastropod mollusc in the family Littorinidae, the winkles or periwinkles.
