= Echinolittorina melanacme =

Scientific classification
- Kingdom: Animalia
- Phylum: Mollusca
- Class: Gastropoda
- Subclass: Caenogastropoda
- Order: Littorinimorpha
- Family: Littorinidae
- Genus: Echinolittorina
- Species: E. melanacme

Binomial name
- Echinolittorina melanacme (E.A. Smith, 1876)

Synonyms
- Litorina picta var. mediocostata Philippi, 1847; Littorina eudeli G.B. Sowerby III, 1915; Littorina melanacme E.A. Smith, 1876; Littorina ventricosa var. strubelli Martens, 1897

Species of gastropod

Echinolittorina melanacme is a species of sea snail, a marine gastropod mollusc in the family Littorinidae, the winkles or periwinkles.
