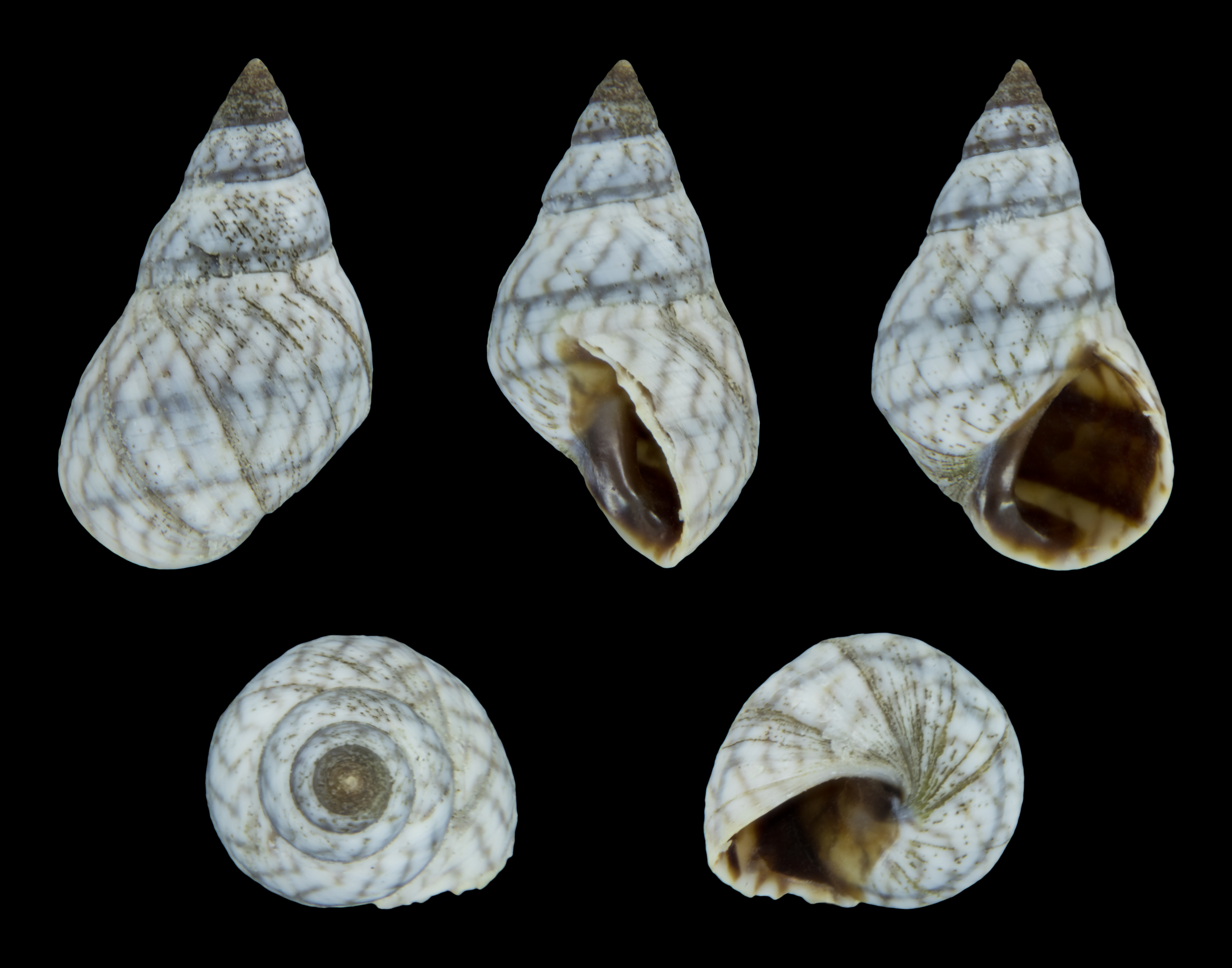

Scientific classification
- Kingdom: Animalia
- Phylum: Mollusca
- Class: Gastropoda
- Subclass: Caenogastropoda
- Order: Littorinimorpha
- Family: Littorinidae
- Genus: Echinolittorina
- Species: E. penicillata

Binomial name
- Echinolittorina penicillata (Carpenter, 1864)

Synonyms
- Littorina penicillata Carpenter, 1864; Nodilittorina penicillata (Carpenter, 1864)

= Echinolittorina penicillata =

Species of gastropod

Echinolittorina penicillata is a species of sea snail, a marine gastropod mollusc in the family Littorinidae, the winkles or periwinkles.
