= Echinolittorina albicarinata =

Scientific classification
- Kingdom: Animalia
- Phylum: Mollusca
- Class: Gastropoda
- Subclass: Caenogastropoda
- Order: Littorinimorpha
- Family: Littorinidae
- Genus: Echinolittorina
- Species: E. albicarinata

Binomial name
- Echinolittorina albicarinata (McLean, 1970)

Synonyms
- Littorina albicarinata McLean, 1970; Nodilittorina albicarinata (McLean, 1970)

Species of gastropod

Echinolittorina albicarinata is a species of sea snail, a marine gastropod mollusc in the family Littorinidae, the winkles or periwinkles.
