= Echinolittorina apicina =

Scientific classification
- Kingdom: Animalia
- Phylum: Mollusca
- Class: Gastropoda
- Subclass: Caenogastropoda
- Order: Littorinimorpha
- Family: Littorinidae
- Genus: Echinolittorina
- Species: E. apicina

Binomial name
- Echinolittorina apicina (Menke, 1851)

Synonyms
- Litorina apicina Menke, 1851; Littorina philippii Carpenter, 1857; Nodilittorina apicina (Menke, 1851)

Species of gastropod

Echinolittorina apicina is a species of sea snail, a marine gastropod mollusc in the family Littorinidae, the winkles or periwinkles.
