= Afrolittorina acutispira =

Scientific classification
- Kingdom: Animalia
- Phylum: Mollusca
- Class: Gastropoda
- Subclass: Caenogastropoda
- Order: Littorinimorpha
- Family: Littorinidae
- Genus: Afrolittorina
- Species: A. acutispira

Binomial name
- Afrolittorina acutispira (E.A. Smith, 1892)

Synonyms
- Echinolittorina acutispira (E.A. Smith, 1892); Littorina acutispira E.A. Smith, 1892; Littorina infans E.A. Smith, 1892

Species of gastropod

Afrolittorina acutispira is a species of sea snail, a marine gastropod mollusk in the family Littorinidae, the winkles or periwinkles.
