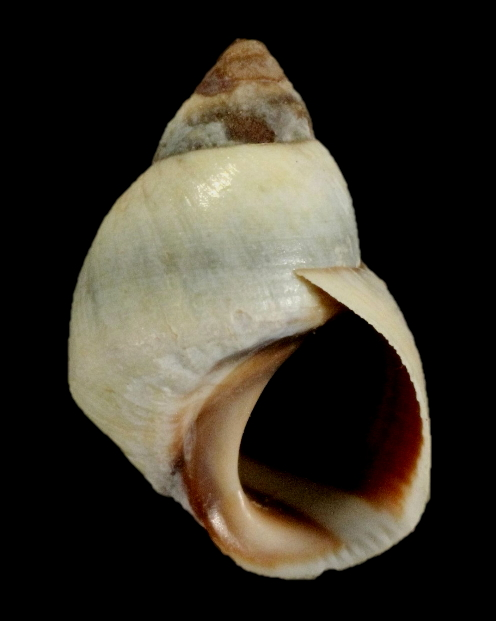
- Shell of Austrolittorina fernandezensis (specimen at Naturalis Biodiversity Center)

Scientific classification
- Kingdom: Animalia
- Phylum: Mollusca
- Class: Gastropoda
- Subclass: Caenogastropoda
- Order: Littorinimorpha
- Family: Littorinidae
- Genus: Austrolittorina
- Species: A. fernandezensis

Binomial name
- Austrolittorina fernandezensis (Rosewater, 1870)

Synonyms
- Echinolittorina fernandezensis (Rosewater, 1970); Littorina penitaria Nevill, 1885 (nomen nudum); Littorina unifasciata fernandezensis Rosewater, 1970; Nodilittorina fernandezensis (Rosewater, 1970)

= Austrolittorina fernandezensis =

Species of gastropod

Austrolittorina fernandezensis is a species of sea snail, a marine gastropod mollusk in the family Littorinidae, the winkles or periwinkles.

== Description ==
The length of the shell attains 18 mm, its diameter 11.3 mm.

== Distribution ==
This marine species was found off Robinson Crusoe Island, Juan Fernández Islands, Chile.
