= Echinolittorina interrupta =

Scientific classification
- Kingdom: Animalia
- Phylum: Mollusca
- Class: Gastropoda
- Subclass: Caenogastropoda
- Order: Littorinimorpha
- Family: Littorinidae
- Genus: Echinolittorina
- Species: E. interrupta

Binomial name
- Echinolittorina interrupta (Philippi, 1847)

Species of gastropod

Echinolittorina interrupta is a species of sea snail, a marine gastropod mollusk in the family Littorinidae, the winkles or periwinkles.

== Description ==
The maximum recorded shell length is 24 mm.

== Habitat ==
The minimum recorded depth for this species is 0 m.; maximum recorded depth is 0 m.
