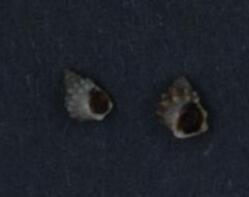

Scientific classification
- Kingdom: Animalia
- Phylum: Mollusca
- Class: Gastropoda
- Subclass: Caenogastropoda
- Order: Littorinimorpha
- Family: Littorinidae
- Genus: Echinolittorina
- Species: E. pascua

Binomial name
- Echinolittorina pascua (Rosewater, 1970)

Synonyms
- Echinolittorina trochoides (Gray, 1839); Echinolittorina (Granulilittorina) pascua Rosewater, 1970; Littorina trochoides Gray, 1839; Nodilittorina pyramidalis pascua Rosewater, 1970; Nodilittorina trochoides (Gray, 1839)

= Echinolittorina pascua =

Species of gastropod

Echinolittorina pascua is a species of sea snail, a marine gastropod mollusc in the family Littorinidae, the winkles or periwinkles.

== Description ==
The shell grows to a length of 15 mm.

== Distribution ==
This species is distributed in the Pacific Ocean along Easter Island
