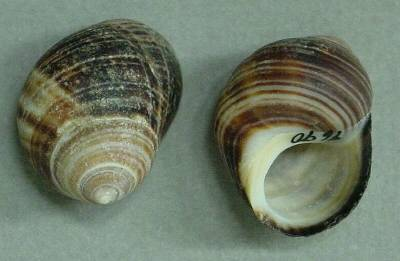
- Two shells of the common periwinkle Littorina littorea

Scientific classification
- Kingdom: Animalia
- Phylum: Mollusca
- Class: Gastropoda
- Subclass: Caenogastropoda
- Order: Littorinimorpha
- Superfamily: Littorinoidea
- Family: Littorinidae; Children, 1834

Subfamilies
- Littorininae Children, 1834; Lacuninae Gray, 1857; Laevilitorininae Reid, 1989

Diversity
- Two freshwater species and numerous marine species.

= Littorinidae =

Family of gastropods

The Littorinidae are a taxonomic family of over 200 species of sea snails, marine gastropod molluscs in the order Littorinimorpha, commonly known as periwinkles and found worldwide.

== Taxonomy ==
These subfamilies have been recognized in the taxonomy of Bouchet & Rocroi (2005):

- Subfamily Littorininae Children, 1834 – synonyms: Echinininae Rosewater, 1972; Tectariinae Rosewater, 1972; Melaraphidae Starobogatov & Sitnikova, 1983
- Subfamily Lacuninae Gray, 1857 – synonyms: Risellidae Kesteven, 1903; Cremnoconchinae Preston, 1915; Bembiciidae Finlay, 1928.
- Subfamily Laevilitorininae Reid, 1989

Genera within the family Littorinidae include:

Littorininae

- Afrolittorina Williams, Reid & Littlewood, 2003
- Austrolittorina Rosewater, 1970
- Cenchritis von Martens, 1900
- Echinolittorina Habe, 1956 – synonyms: Amerolittorina Reid, 2009; Fossarilittorina Rosewater, 1981; Granulilittorina Habe & Kosuge, 1966; Lineolittorina Reid, 2009
- Littoraria Griffith & Pidgeon, 1834 – 39 species
- Littorina Férussac, 1822 – 18 species – type genus
- Mainwaringia Nevill, 1885
- Melarhaphe Menke, 1828
- Nodilittorina von Martens, 1897 – this genus proved to be polyphyletic and in 2003 was divided into:
  - Echinolittorina – 59 species worldwide
  - Austrolittorina – five species
  - Afrolittorina – four species
  - Nodilittorina s.s. – the monotypic subgenus
- Peasiella - Nevill, 1885
- Tectarius Valenciennes, 1833 – 11 species, its synonym or subgenus includes: Echininus Clench & Abbott, 1942.

Lacuninae

- Bembicium Philippi, 1846
- Cremnoconchus Blanford, 1869 – freshwater snails living in waterfalls.
- Lacuna Turton, 1827 – synonym: Aquilonaria Dall, 1886
- Pellilitorina Pfeffer in Martens & Pfeffer, 1886
- Risellopsis Kesteven, 1902

Laevilitorininae

- Laevilacunaria Powell, 1951
- Laevilitorina Pfeiffer, 1886

subfamily ?

- Algamorda Dall, 1918
- Macquariella Finlay, 1927 (?)
- Rissolitorina Ponder, 1966

Synonyms

- Corneolitorina Powell, 1951: synonym of Laevilitorina (Laevilitorina) Pfeffer in Martens & Pfeffer, 1886 represented as Laevilitorina Pfeffer, 1886
- Haloconcha Dall, 1886 is a synonym for Lacunaria Dall, 1885
- Macquariella Finlay, 1926: synonym of Laevilitorina Pfeffer, 1886
- Rissolittorina Ponder, 1966: synonym of Laevilitorina Pfeffer, 1886
