= Photis conchicola =

Scientific classification
- Domain: Eukaryota
- Kingdom: Animalia
- Phylum: Arthropoda
- Class: Malacostraca
- Order: Amphipoda
- Family: Photidae
- Genus: Photis
- Species: P. conchicola

Binomial name
- Photis conchicola Alderman, 1936

Species of crustacean

Photis conchicola is a species of marine amphipod crustacean which lives in the Eastern Pacific Ocean. It grows to a length of 5.5 mm (0.22 in), and lives on rocky beaches among algae and surfgrass. It often inhabits discarded gastropod shells, which it attaches to marine plants.

== Ecology ==
Predators of P. conchicola include the fish Embiotoca lateralis. The shells used by P. conchicola are chiefly Alia carinata, Tricolia pulloides, Bittium eschrichtii, Amphissa versicolor, Lacuna marmorata and Lacuna unifasciata.
