= Laevilitorina =

Scientific classification
- Kingdom: Animalia
- Phylum: Mollusca
- Class: Gastropoda
- Subclass: Caenogastropoda
- Order: Littorinimorpha
- Family: Littorinidae
- Genus: Laevilitorina; Pfeiffer, 1886

Species
- See text

Synonyms
- Corneolitorina Powell, 1951; Laevilacunaria (Pellilacunella) Powell, 1951; Laevilitorina (Laevilitorina) Pfeffer in Martens & Pfeffer, 1886· accepted, alternate representation; Laevilitorina (Macquariella) Finlay, 1926· accepted, alternate representation; Laevilitorina (Pellilacunella) Powell, 1951· accepted, alternate representation; Laevilitorina (Rissolittorina) Ponder, 1966· accepted, alternate representation; Laevilitorina (Rufolacuna) Ponder, 1976· accepted, alternate representation; Macquariella Finlay, 1926; Rissolittorina Ponder, 1966

Genus of gastropods

Laevilitorina is a genus of small sea snails, marine gastropod molluscs in the family Littorinidae, the winkles or periwinkles.

== Species ==
Species in the genus Laevilitorina include:

- Laevilitorina alta (Powell, 1940)
- Laevilitorina antarctica (E. A. Smith, 1902)
- Laevilitorina antipodum (Filhol, 1880)
- Laevilitorina aucklandica (Powell, 1933)
- Laevilitorina bifasciata (Suter, 1913
- Laevilitorina bruniensis (Beddome, 1883)
- Laevilitorina caliginosa (Gould, 1849)
- Laevilitorina claviformis Preston, 1916
- Laevilitorina delli (Powell, 1955)
- Laevilitorina granum Pfeffer in Martens & Pfeffer, 1886
- Laevilitorina hamiltoni (E.A. Smith, 1898)
- Laevilitorina heardensis Dell, 1964
- Laevilitorina johnstoni (Cotton, 1945)
- Laevilitorina kingensis (May, 1924)
- Laevilitorina latior Preston, 1912
- Laevilitorina macphersonae (Dell, 1964)
- Laevilitorina mariae (Tenison Woods, 1876)
- Laevilitorina pygmaea Pfeffer in Martens & Pfeffer, 1886
- Laevilitorina umbilicata Pfeffer in Martens & Pfeffer, 1886
- Laevilitorina venusta Pfeffer in Martens & Pfeffer, 1886
- Laevilitorina wandelensis (Lamy, 1905)

Species brought into synonymy

- Laevilitorina antarctica (Martens, 1885): synonym of Laevilacunaria antarctica (Martens, 1885)
- Laevilitorina bennetti (Preston, 1916): synonym of Laevilacunaria bennetti (Preston, 1916)
- Laevilitorina bennetti Preston, 1912: synonym of Eatoniella bennetti (Preston, 1912)
- Laevilitorina burni Ponder, 1976: synonym of Laevilitorina johnstoni (Cotton, 1945)
- Laevilitorina coriacea (Melvill & Standen, 1907): synonym of Laevilitorina caliginosa (Gould, 1849)
- Laevilitorina cystophora Finlay, 1924: synonym of Rissoella cystophora (Finlay, 1924)
- Laevilitorina elongata Pelseneer, 1903: synonym of Laevilitorina caliginosa (Gould, 1849)
- Laevilitorina iredalei Brookes, 1926: synonym of Elachisina iredalei (Brookes, 1926)
- Laevilitorina labioflecta Dell, 1990: synonym of Dickdellia labioflecta (Dell, 1990)
- Laevilitorina micra Finlay, 1924: synonym of Rissoella micra (Finlay, 1924)
- Laevilitorina pumilio (E.A. Smith, 1875): synonym of Laevilacunaria pumilio (E. A. Smith, 1875)
