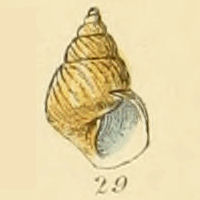
- Lacuna crassior shell

Scientific classification
- Kingdom: Animalia
- Phylum: Mollusca
- Class: Gastropoda
- Subclass: Caenogastropoda
- Order: Littorinimorpha
- Family: Littorinidae
- Genus: Lacuna; Turton, 1827

Synonyms
- Aquilonaria Dall, 1886; Boetica Dall, 1918; Epheria Leach, 1847; Haloconcha Dall, 1886; Lacuna (Epheria) Leach, 1847; Lacuna (Lacunella) Dall, 1884 (non Deshayes, 1861); Lacunaria Dall, 1885 (non Conrad, 1866); Lacunitunica Golikov & Gulbin, 1978; Medoria Leach in Gray, 1847; Tamanella [sic]; Temanella Rovereto, 1899

= Lacuna (gastropod) =

Genus of gastropods

Lacuna is a genus of sea snails, marine gastropod mollusks in the family Littorinidae, the winkles or periwinkles.

== Description ==
The spiral animal body is elongated. The mouth has a proboscis with two thick lips and a spiral, filiform tongue. There are two slender, contractile tentacles with the eyes on small pedicels near their base. The foot is oval and somewhat broader behind.

The thin shell has an ovate-conical or subglobose shape and is covered with a delicate horny periostracum. It has a short spire with convex whorls that are rapidly expanding. The last whorl is ventricose, i.e. inflated in the middle. The apex is rather obtuse. The oval or roundish aperture is covered with a horny, spirally marked operculum. The peristome is incomplete behind. The columella is flattened and forms with the peristome an elongated groove continued from the umbilicus. This groove is bounded internally by the decurved margin of the pillar.

== Species ==
The following species are recognised in the genus Lacuna:

- Lacuna amaina Cossmann, 1888 †
- Lacuna carinifera A. Adams, 1853
- Lacuna cleicecabrale Barros, 1994
- Lacuna crassior (Montagu, 1803)
- Lacuna decorata A. Adams, 1861
- Lacuna dialyta Cossmann, 1896 †
- Lacuna dutemplii Deshayes, 1861 †
- Lacuna globulosa Deshayes, 1861 †
- Lacuna grandis Cossmann, 1902 †
- Lacuna houdasi Cossmann, 1913 †
- Lacuna latifasciata A. Adams, 1863
- Lacuna lepidula A. Adams, 1863
- Lacuna lukinii (Golikov & Gulbin, 1978)
- Lacuna macrostoma Deshayes, 1861 †
- Lacuna marmorata Dall, 1919
- Lacuna minor (Dall, 1919)
- Lacuna orientalis (Golikov & Kussakin, 1985)
- Lacuna pallidula (da Costa, 1778)
- Lacuna parva (da Costa, 1778)
- Lacuna porrecta P. P. Carpenter, 1864
- Lacuna pulchella Deshayes, 1861 †
- Lacuna pumilio E. A. Smith, 1890
- Lacuna reflexa Dall, 1884
- Lacuna sigaretina Deshayes, 1861 †
- Lacuna smithii Pilsbry, 1895
- Lacuna succinea S. S. Berry, 1953
- Lacuna sulcifera Cossmann, 1896 †
- Lacuna turgida Deshayes, 1861 †
- Lacuna turneri (Dall, 1886)
- Lacuna turrita A. Adams, 1861
- Lacuna uchidai (Habe, 1953)
- Lacuna unifasciata Carpenter, 1857
- Lacuna vaginata (Dall, 1918)
- Lacuna variegata Carpenter, 1864
- Lacuna vincta (Montagu, 1803)

Species brought into synonymy

- Lacuna abyssicola Melvill & Standen, 1912: synonym of Moelleriopsis poppei Engl, 2012
- Lacuna azonata Locard, 1886: synonym of Megalomphalus azoneus (Brusina, 1865)
- Lacuna carinata Gould, 1848: synonym of Lacuna vincta (Montagu, 1803)
- Lacuna cossmanni Locard, 1897 : synonym of Benthobia tryonii Dall, 1889
- Lacuna macmurdensis Hedley, 1911 : synonym of Trilirata macmurdensis (Hedley, 1911)
- Lacuna mediterranea Monterosato, 1869 : synonym of Ersilia mediterranea (Monterosato, 1869)
- Lacuna neritoidea Gould, 1840 : synonym of Lacuna pallidula (da Costa, 1778)
- Lacuna notorcadensis Melvill & Standen, 1907: synonym of Laevilitorina wandelensis (Lamy, 1905)
- Lacuna pallidula var. patula Hanley in Thorpe, 1844: synonym of Lacuna pallidula (da Costa, 1778)
- Lacuna puteolus (Turton, 1819) : synonym of Lacuna parva (da Costa, 1778)
