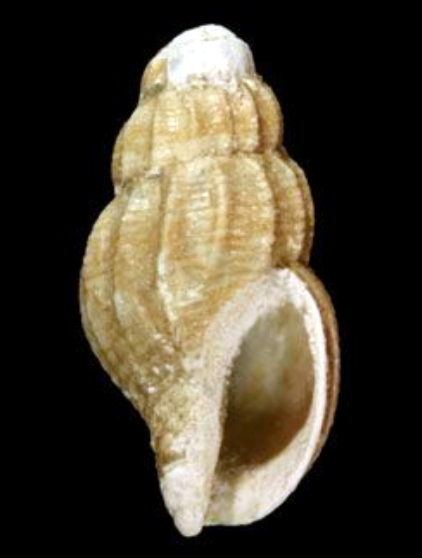
- Shell of Amphissa bicolor (specimen at the Natural History Museum Rotterdam)

Scientific classification
- Kingdom: Animalia
- Phylum: Mollusca
- Class: Gastropoda
- Subclass: Caenogastropoda
- Order: Neogastropoda
- Family: Columbellidae
- Genus: Amphissa
- Species: A. bicolor

Binomial name
- Amphissa bicolor Dall, 1892

= Amphissa bicolor =

Species of gastropod

Amphissa bicolor is a species of sea snail, a marine gastropod mollusc in the family Columbellidae, the dove snails.

== Description ==
The length of the shell attains 14 mm its diameter 8 mm.

(Original description) The shell is small and solid, appearing pale with brown bands and possessing six convex whorls. The protoconch is eroded in the specimens, and the suture is distinct and not appressed. The whorls are full, with 11 to 13 narrow, rounded ribs extending nearly from suture to suture. The spiral sculpture consists of numerous flattened, strap-like cinguli separated by subequal, channeled, shallow interspaces. The epidermis is thin and yellowish. The color of the shell is pale straw with a brownish base and a brown band extending from the periphery halfway back to the suture. The aperture is about equal to the spire, with the penultimate rib behind it a little swollen. The columella is slender, polished white with little callus; the siphonal canal is wide, short, and recurved. The outer lip is simple, slightly reflected, and not lirate inside.

The operculum is brownish and resembles that of Amphissa versicolor Dall, 1871. The brown coloration, though generally disposed in bands as described, is variable; it occasionally appears in a zigzag pattern on the pale ground, or is generally suffused over the surface, or even maculated, as in Nitidella. The apex, when perfect, is probably moderately acute, but is more or less eroded on all specimens.

== Distribution ==
This species occurs from Monterey to San Diego, California at depths between 70 m and 600 m.
