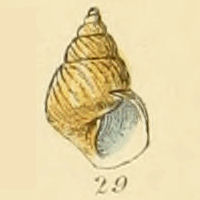

Scientific classification
- Kingdom: Animalia
- Phylum: Mollusca
- Class: Gastropoda
- Subclass: Caenogastropoda
- Order: Littorinimorpha
- Family: Littorinidae
- Genus: Lacuna
- Species: L. crassior

Binomial name
- Lacuna crassior (Montagu, 1803)

= Lacuna crassior =

Species of gastropod

Lacuna crassior is a species of sea snail, a marine gastropod mollusk in the family Littorinidae, the winkles or periwinkles.

== Distribution ==
Lacuna crassior is a circumboreal and subarctic species that has Britain as its southern limit. It has though be found in the Channel Islands and Roscoff, the edges of its southerly range.

== Description ==
Lacuna crassior is yellow in colour and can grow up to 14 × 10 mm in length. The maximum recorded shell length is 14 mm. Its body is very similar in shape to the Lacuna vincta, with a long, broad snout and slender head tentacles. Its foot is elongated, with a double-edged anterior margin and two short, white, metapodial tentacles projecting from below the operculum. These metapodial tentacles are less flattened than those of Lacuna vincta.

The Lacuna crassior has a strong shell, with six to seven turreted whorls. Its fine spiral striae and vertical costae are mostly obscured by thick periostracum, but form a series of irregular folds on the shell's last whorl. The umbilicus is occasionally closed and the umbilical groove reduced with the aperture drawn out and angulated at the base of the columella.

== Habitat ==
It is uncommon and occurs at low water spring tide (LWST), the lower part of the beach that is uncovered only a few times a month during spring tides. It also occurs offshore at a depths greater than 30 metres and up to 90 m. It can be found among stones within mud, sand, gravel and coarser sediments.

Minimum recorded depth is 2 m. Maximum recorded depth is 176 m.
