= Ersilia (given name) =

Ersilia is a feminine given name.

== List of people with the given name ==
- Ersilia Caetani Lovatelli (1840–1925), Italian art historian, cultural historian and archaeologist
- Ersilia Cavedagni (1862–1951), Italian-American Italian-American anarcho-feminist
- Ersilia Fossati (1921-1999), Swiss politician
- Ersilia Soudais (born 1988), French politician

== See also ==
- Ersilia, genus of gastropods
