= Laevilitorina pygmaea =

Scientific classification
- Kingdom: Animalia
- Phylum: Mollusca
- Class: Gastropoda
- Subclass: Caenogastropoda
- Order: Littorinimorpha
- Family: Littorinidae
- Genus: Laevilitorina
- Species: L. pygmaea

Binomial name
- Laevilitorina pygmaea Pfeffer, 1886

Species of gastropod

Laevilitorina pygmaea is a species of sea snail, a marine gastropod mollusk in the family Littorinidae, the winkles or periwinkles.

== Description ==
The maximum recorded shell length is 2.5 mm.

== Habitat ==
Minimum recorded depth is 252 m. Maximum recorded depth is 310 m.
