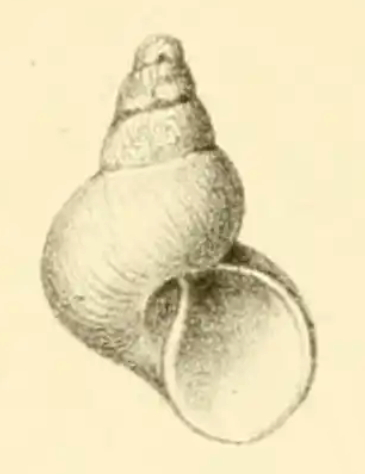
- Shell of Streptocionella singularis (holotype)

Scientific classification
- Kingdom: Animalia
- Phylum: Mollusca
- Class: Gastropoda
- Family: Pyramidellidae
- Genus: Streptocionella
- Species: S. singularis

Binomial name
- Streptocionella singularis Pfeffer in Martens & Pfeffer, 1886

= Streptocionella singularis =

Species of gastropod

Streptocionella singularis is a species of small sea snail, a marine gastropod mollusk in the family Pyramidellidae, the pyrams and their allies.

== Description ==
The length of the shell measures 3.8 mm.

(Original description in Latin) The thin shell is ovate-turreted, minimally calcareous, chitinous, pale yellowish-brown, and features an inconspicuous sculpture. The spire is elevated, though the apex is missing or unknown. There are approximately five convex whorls, which are separated by a very oblique, deep suture. The body whorl is large and rounded. The aperture occupies two-fifths of the total length of the shell and is squarely circular in shape; both its outer and lower margins are regularly circular, while the columellar margin is narrow, reflected, somewhat flattened, slightly S-shaped, and almost reaches the outer margin. The columellar fossa is slightly deep and very lightly bordered. Finally, the peristome is chitinous, non-continuous, and surrounds the aperture like a somewhat spreading membrane.

== Distribution ==
This marine species occurs off the South Georgia Islands in the southern Atlantic Ocean.
