= Laevilitorina granum =

Scientific classification
- Kingdom: Animalia
- Phylum: Mollusca
- Class: Gastropoda
- Subclass: Caenogastropoda
- Order: Littorinimorpha
- Family: Littorinidae
- Genus: Laevilitorina
- Species: L. granum

Binomial name
- Laevilitorina granum Pfeffer in Martens & Pfeffer, 1886

Species of gastropod

Laevilitorina granum is a species of sea snail, a marine gastropod mollusk in the family Littorinidae, the winkles or periwinkles.

== Distribution ==
Laevilitornia granum is commonly found in the Western Atlantic Ocean.
