= L. orientalis =

L. orientalis may refer to:

- Lactuca orientalis, a plant species
- Lacuna orientalis, a sea snail species
- Lasionycta orientalis, a moth species found in Tajikistan and Kyrgyzstan
- Laxmannia orientalis, a tufted perennial herb species in the genus Laxmannia endemic to Australia
- Leptorhynchos orientalis, an annual or perennial herb species in the genus Leptorhynchos endemic to Australia
- Limaria orientalis, the file shell, a bivalve mollusc species
- Liquidambar orientalis, the Oriental sweetgum or Turkish sweetgum, a deciduous tree species native to the eastern Mediterranean region
- Lonchoptera orientalis, a spear-winged fly species in the genus Lonchoptera

== See also ==
- Orientalis (disambiguation)
