= L. antarctica =

L. antarctica may refer to:

- Laevilitorina antarctica, species of sea snail
- Laevipilina antarctica, species of monoplacophoran
- Lewinella antarctica, species of Gram-negative bacteria
