= Frovina indecora =

Scientific classification
- Kingdom: Animalia
- Phylum: Mollusca
- Class: Gastropoda
- Subclass: Caenogastropoda
- Order: Littorinimorpha
- Family: Zerotulidae
- Genus: Frovina
- Species: F. indecora

Binomial name
- Frovina indecora (Thiele, 1912)

Synonyms
- Prolacuna indecora (Thiele, 1912); Sublacuna indecora Thiele, 1912 (basionym)

Species of gastropod

Frovina indecora is a species of predatory sea snail, a marine gastropod mollusk in the family Zerotulidae.

== Description ==
The maximum recorded shell length is 3.6 mm (0.14 in).

== Habitat ==
Minimum recorded depth is 311 m. Maximum recorded depth is 426 m.
