= Streptocionella =

Scientific classification
- Kingdom: Animalia
- Phylum: Mollusca
- Class: Gastropoda
- Family: Pyramidellidae
- Genus: Streptocionella; Pfeffer, 1886

Genus of gastropods

Streptocionella is a genus of sea snails, marine gastropod mollusks in the family Pyramidellidae, the pyrams and their allies.

== Species ==
Species within the genus Streptocionella include:

- Streptocionella pluralis Dell, 1990
- Streptocionella singularis Pfeffer, G., 1886
