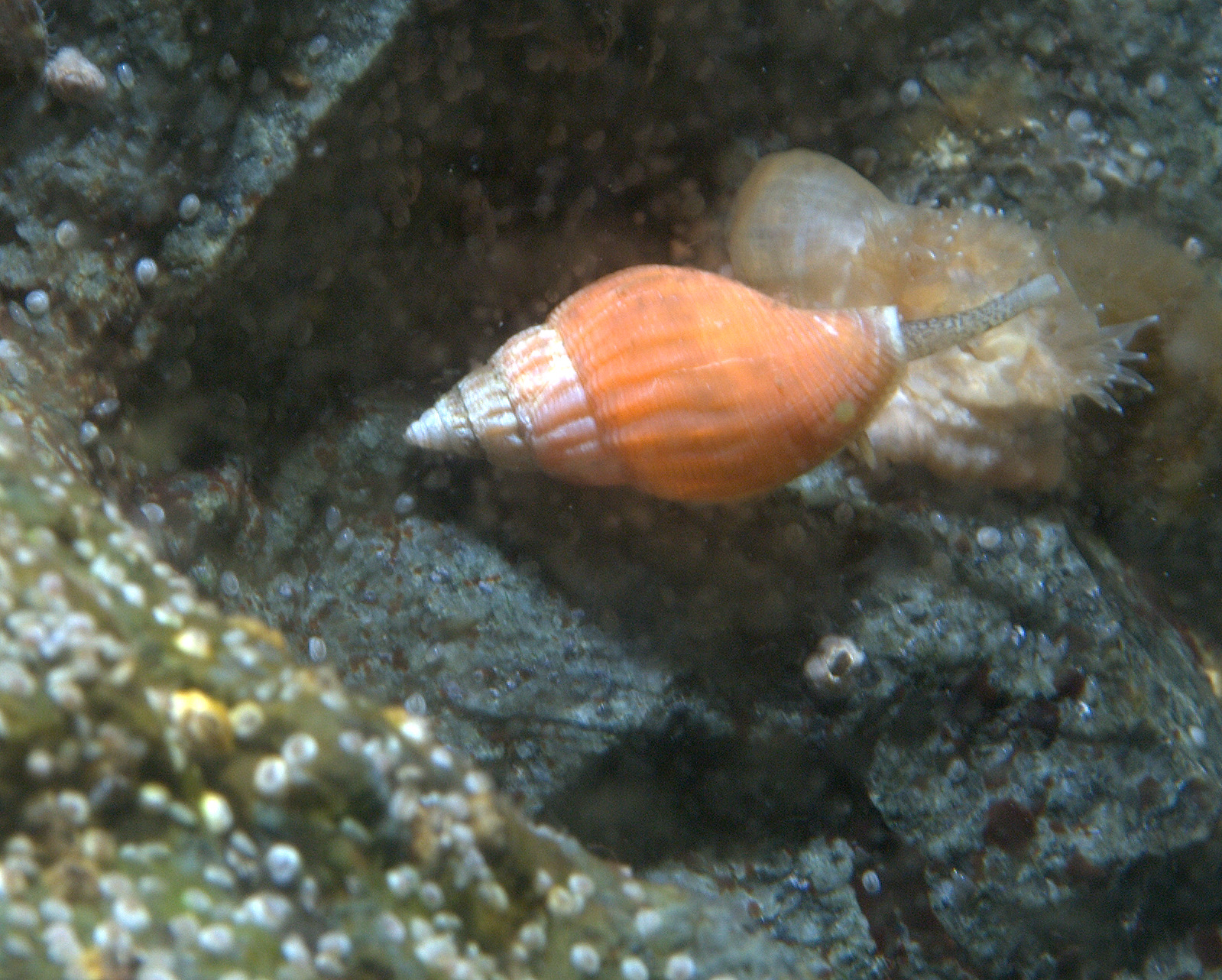
- Amphissa columbiana

Scientific classification
- Domain: Eukaryota
- Kingdom: Animalia
- Phylum: Mollusca
- Class: Gastropoda
- Subclass: Caenogastropoda
- Order: Neogastropoda
- Superfamily: Buccinoidea
- Family: Columbellidae
- Genus: Amphissa; Adams & Adams, 1853

Type species
- Buccinum corrugatum Reeve, 1847

Synonyms
- Cominella (Amphissa) H. Adams & A. Adams, 1853 (original rank)

= Amphissa (gastropod) =

Genus of gastropods

Amphissa is a genus of small sea snails, marine gastropod mollusks in the family Columbellidae, the dove snails.

== Description ==
The length of the buccinoid shell ranges from 10–30 mm. The aperture of the shell is anteriorly dilated, the contraction near the spire obsolete.

== Species ==
Species within the genus Amphissa include:

- Amphissa acuminata (E. A. Smith, 1915)
- Amphissa acutecostata (R. A. Philippi, 1844)
- Amphissa bicolor Dall, 1892
- Amphissa cancellata (Castellanos, 1979)
- Amphissa columbiana Dall, 1916
- Amphissa inopinata K. Monsecour & D. Monsecour, 2024
- Amphissa reticulata Dall, 1916
- Amphissa triangularis K. Monsecour & D. Monsecour, 2024
- Amphissa undata (P. P. Carpenter, 1864)
- Amphissa versicolor Dall, 1871

Synonyms

- Amphissa (Cosmioconcha) Dall, 1913: synonym of Cosmioconcha Dall, 1913 (original rank)
- Amphissa corrugata (Reeve, 1847): synonym of Amphissa columbiana Dall, 1916
- Amphissa costulata (Cantraine, 1835): synonym of Amphissa acutecostata (R. A. Philippi, 1844) (junior homonym)
- Amphissa cymata Dall, 1916: synonym of Amphissa versicolor Dall, 1871
- Amphissa haliaeeti (Jeffreys, 1867): synonym of Amphissa acutecostata (R. A. Philippi, 1844)
- Amphissa lyrta F. Baker, G. D. Hanna & A. M. Strong, 1938: synonym of Decipifus lyrta (F. Baker, G. D. Hanna & A. M. Strong, 1938) (original combination)
- Amphissa palmeri Dall, 1913: synonym of Cosmioconcha palmeri (Dall, 1913) (original combination)
- Amphissa parvula Dall, 1913: synonym of Cosmioconcha parvula (Dall, 1913) (original combination)
- Amphissa pergracilis Dall, 1913: synonym of Cosmioconcha pergracilis (Dall, 1913) (original combination)
- † Amphissa ventricosa Arnold, 1903 : synonym of Amphissa undata (P. P. Carpenter, 1864)
