= Laevilitorina umbilicata =

Scientific classification
- Kingdom: Animalia
- Phylum: Mollusca
- Class: Gastropoda
- Subclass: Caenogastropoda
- Order: Littorinimorpha
- Family: Littorinidae
- Genus: Laevilitorina
- Species: L. umbilicata

Binomial name
- Laevilitorina umbilicata Pfeffer in Martens & Pfeffer, 1886

Species of gastropod

Laevilitorina umbilicata is a species of sea snail, a marine gastropod mollusk in the family Littorinidae, the winkles or periwinkles.
