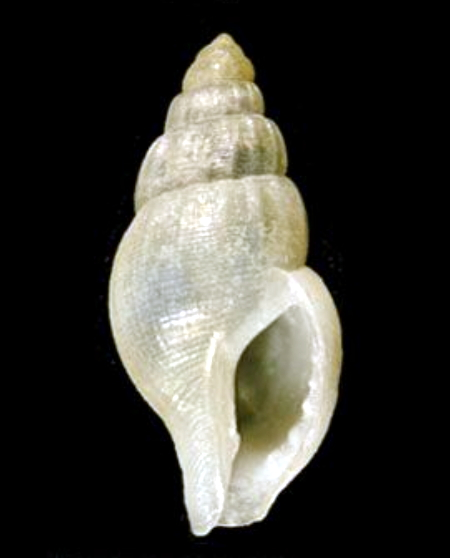
- Shell of Amphissa acutecostata (specimen at the Natural History Museum Rotterdam)

Scientific classification
- Kingdom: Animalia
- Phylum: Mollusca
- Class: Gastropoda
- Subclass: Caenogastropoda
- Order: Neogastropoda
- Family: Columbellidae
- Genus: Amphissa
- Species: A. acutecostata

Binomial name
- Amphissa acutecostata (Philippi, 1844)

Synonyms
- Amphissa haliaeeti (Jeffreys, 1867); Anachis costulata Verrill, 1880; Anachis costulata var. elongata Locard, 1897; Anachis haliaeeti (Jeffreys, 1867); Anachis haliaeeti var. attenuata Locard, 1897; Anachis haliaeeti var. costulatissima Locard, 1897; Anachis haliaeeti var. curta Locard, 1897; Anachis haliaeeti var. major Locard, 1897; Anachis haliaeti [sic] (misspelling); Anachis nicolayi Nordsieck, 1976; Bela grimaldii Dautzenberg, 1889; Bela limatula Locard, 1896; Bela simplicata Locard, 1896 ·; Bellaspira grimaldii (Dautzenberg, 1889); Buccinum acutecostatum Philippi, 1844 (basionym); Buccinum acute-costatum Philippi, 1844 (incorrect original spelling); Buccinum testae Aradas, 1847; Columbella haliaeeti Jeffreys, 1867; Columbella haliaeeti var. albula Jeffreys, 1869; Columbella haliaeti [sic] (misspelling); Fusus costulatus Cantraine, 1835 (invalid: junior homonym of Fusus costulatus Lamarck, 1822); Oenopota harpularia Grieg, 1931; Oenopota simplex Locard, 1896; Pyrene costulata (Cantraine, 1835)

= Amphissa acutecostata =

Species of gastropod

Amphissa acutecostata is a species of sea snail, a marine gastropod mollusc in the family Columbellidae, the dove snails.

== Description ==
The length of the shell varies between 5 mm and 8 mm, its diameter between 2 mm and 3 mm.

It shows a resemblance to Oenopota pyramidalis (Strøm, 1788) (synonym: Bela pyramidalis), but it is smaller and shorter. The spire is less acuminate. The body whorl is higher. The aperture is not as high. The shell contains less longitudinal ribs, which become obsolete at the body whorl where they are replaced by plicae.

== Distribution ==
This species occurs in the Bay of Biscay off France ar depths between 650 m and 1410 m.

Fossils have been found in Late Miocene strata in Southeast Spain.
