= Laevilitorina hamiltoni =

Scientific classification
- Kingdom: Animalia
- Phylum: Mollusca
- Class: Gastropoda
- Subclass: Caenogastropoda
- Order: Littorinimorpha
- Family: Littorinidae
- Genus: Laevilitorina
- Species: L. hamiltoni

Binomial name
- Laevilitorina hamiltoni (Smith, 1898)

Species of gastropod

Laevilitorina hamiltoni is a species of sea snail, a marine gastropod mollusk in the family Littorinidae, the winkles or periwinkles.

Laevilitorina (Macquariella) hamiltoni (E. A. Smith, 1898) is an accepted, alternate representation of Macquariella hamiltoni (E. A. Smith, 1898)
