= Lacuna turneri =

Scientific classification
- Kingdom: Animalia
- Phylum: Mollusca
- Class: Gastropoda
- Subclass: Caenogastropoda
- Order: Littorinimorpha
- Family: Littorinidae
- Genus: Lacuna
- Species: L. turneri

Binomial name
- Lacuna turneri (Dall, 1886)

Synonyms
- Aquilonaria turneri Dall, 1886

Species of gastropod

Lacuna turneri is a species of sea snail, a marine gastropod mollusk in the family Littorinidae, the winkles or periwinkles.
