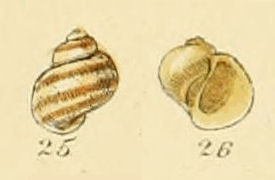

Scientific classification
- Kingdom: Animalia
- Phylum: Mollusca
- Class: Gastropoda
- Subclass: Caenogastropoda
- Order: Littorinimorpha
- Family: Littorinidae
- Genus: Lacuna
- Species: L. parva

Binomial name
- Lacuna parva (da Costa, 1778)

Synonyms
- Cochlea parva da Costa, 1778; Helix fasciata J. Adams, 1800; Helix lacuna Montagu, 1803 ·; Lacuna (Epheria) fasciata (J. Adams, 1800); Lacuna intermedia Locard, 1886; Lacuna puteolina Locard, 1886; Lacuna puteolus (Turton, 1819); Lacuna puteolus var. clausa Jeffreys, 1865; Lacuna puteolus var. conica Jeffreys, 1865; Lacuna puteolus var. expansa Jeffreys, 1865; Lacuna puteolus var. lactea Jeffreys, 1865; Lacuna puteolus var. plicata J. T. Marshall, 1893; Turbo puteolus W. Turton, 1819

= Lacuna parva =

Species of gastropod

Lacuna parva, common name the tiny lacuna, is a species of sea snail, a marine gastropod mollusk in the family Littorinidae, the winkles or periwinkles.

== Distribution ==
- Southern Cape Cod and Nantucket, Massachusetts
- Distribution similar with L. vincta but extending further south to Spanish coasts
