= Cosmioconcha nana =

Scientific classification
- Kingdom: Animalia
- Phylum: Mollusca
- Class: Gastropoda
- Subclass: Caenogastropoda
- Order: Neogastropoda
- Family: Columbellidae
- Genus: Cosmioconcha
- Species: C. nana

Binomial name
- Cosmioconcha nana Garcia, 2007

Species of gastropod

Cosmioconcha nana is a species of sea snail, a marine gastropod mollusc in the family Columbellidae, the dove snails.
