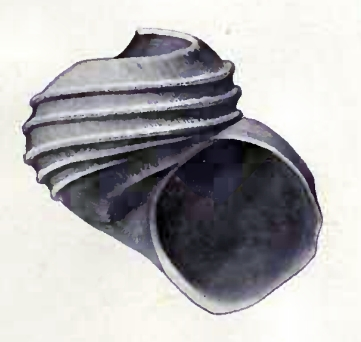
- Trilirata macmurdensis

Scientific classification
- Kingdom: Animalia
- Phylum: Mollusca
- Class: Gastropoda
- Subclass: Caenogastropoda
- Order: Littorinimorpha
- Family: Zerotulidae
- Genus: Trilirata; Warén & Hain, 1996

= Trilirata =

Genus of gastropods

Trilirata is a genus of predatory sea snails, marine gastropod mollusks in the family Zerotulidae.

== Species ==
Species within the genus Trilirata include:

- Trilirata herosae
- Trilirata macmurdensis
- Trilirata sexcarinata
- Trilirata triregis
