= Lacuna carinifera =

Scientific classification
- Kingdom: Animalia
- Phylum: Mollusca
- Class: Gastropoda
- Subclass: Caenogastropoda
- Order: Littorinimorpha
- Family: Littorinidae
- Genus: Lacuna
- Species: L. carinifera

Binomial name
- Lacuna carinifera A. Adams, 1851

Synonyms
- List: Lacuna oxytropis Pilsbry, 1895; Lacuna setonaikaiensis (Habe, 1958); Lacuna unicarinata E. A. Smith, 1875; Stenotis cariniferus (A. Adams, 1853); Stenotis setonaikaiensis Habe, 1958

Species of gastropod

Lacuna carinifera is a species of sea snail, a marine gastropod mollusk in the family Littorinidae, the winkles or periwinkles.
