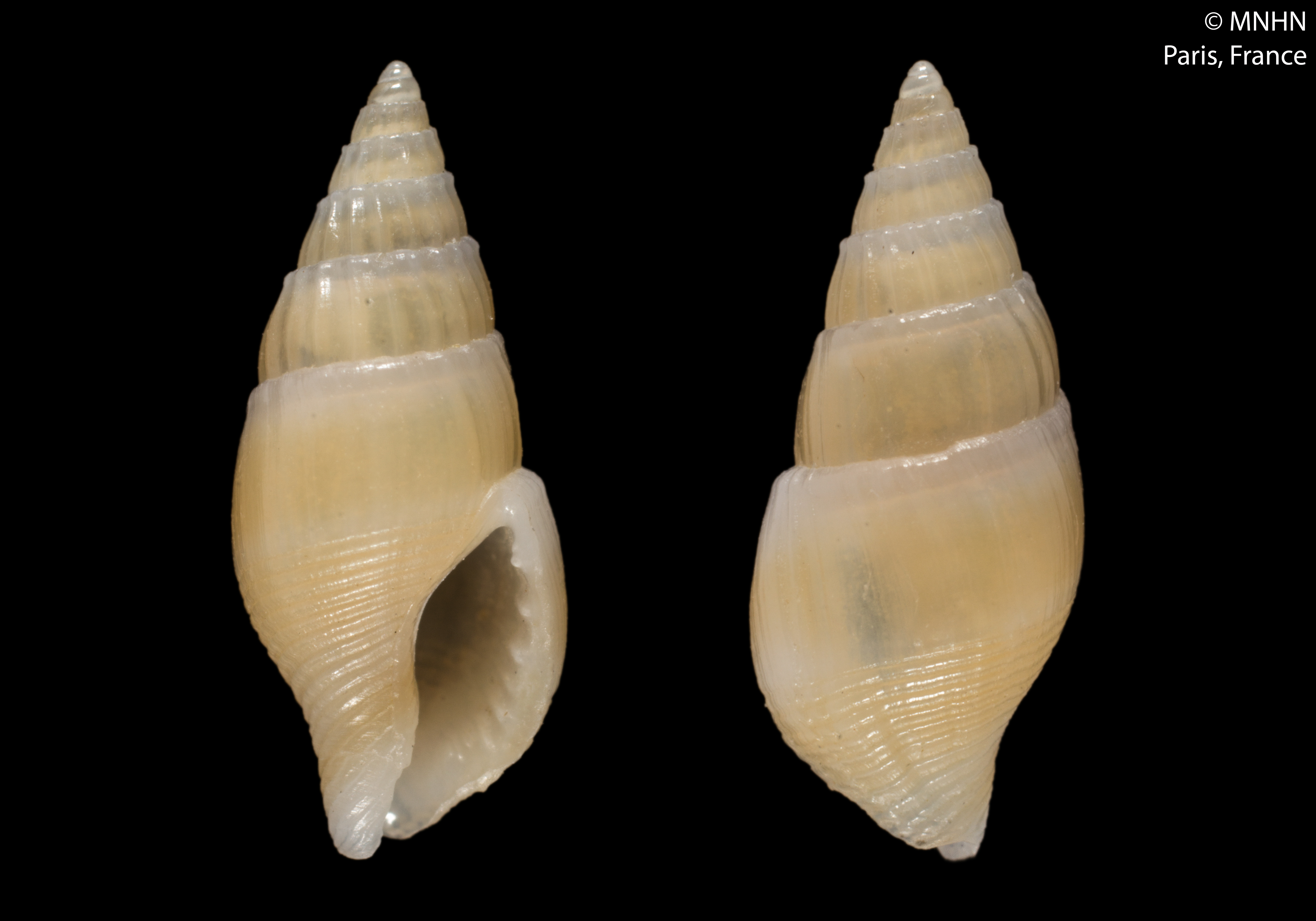
- Shell of Cosmioconcha rikae (holotype at MNHN, Paris)

Scientific classification
- Kingdom: Animalia
- Phylum: Mollusca
- Class: Gastropoda
- Subclass: Caenogastropoda
- Order: Neogastropoda
- Family: Columbellidae
- Genus: Cosmioconcha
- Species: C. rikae

Binomial name
- Cosmioconcha rikae Monsecour & Monsecour, 2006

= Cosmioconcha rikae =

Species of gastropod

Cosmioconcha rikae is a species of sea snail, a marine gastropod mollusc in the family Columbellidae, the dove snails.

== Description ==
The length of the shell attains 7.9 mm.

== Distribution ==
This species occurs in the Caribbean Sea off Panama.
