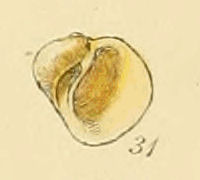

Scientific classification
- Kingdom: Animalia
- Phylum: Mollusca
- Class: Gastropoda
- Subclass: Caenogastropoda
- Order: Littorinimorpha
- Family: Littorinidae
- Genus: Lacuna
- Species: L. pallidula

Binomial name
- Lacuna pallidula (da Costa, 1778)

Synonyms
- Lacuna neritoidea Gould, 1840; Lacuna patula Thorpe, 1844; Nerita pallidulus da Costa, 1778

= Lacuna pallidula =

Species of gastropod

Lacuna pallidula, common name the pale lacuna, is a species of sea snail, a marine gastropod mollusk in the family Littorinidae, the winkles or periwinkles.

== Description ==
The maximum recorded shell length is 10 mm.

== Habitat ==
Minimum recorded depth is 0 m. Maximum recorded depth is 70 m.
