= Frovina =

Scientific classification
- Kingdom: Animalia
- Phylum: Mollusca
- Class: Gastropoda
- Subclass: Caenogastropoda
- Order: Littorinimorpha
- Family: Zerotulidae
- Genus: Frovina; Thiele, 1912

Synonyms
- Frigidilacuna Tomlin, 1930; Prolacuna Thiele, 1913; Sublacuna Thiele, 1912 (Invalid: junior homonym of Sublacuna Pilsbry, 1895; Prolacuna and Frigidilacuna are replacement names)

Genus of gastropods

Frovina is a genus of predatory sea snails, marine gastropod mollusks in the family Zerotulidae, the moon snails.

== Species ==
- Frovina angularis Warén & Hain, 1996
- Frovina indecora (Thiele, 1912)
- Frovina soror Thiele, 1912
