= Laevilacunaria =

Scientific classification
- Kingdom: Animalia
- Phylum: Mollusca
- Class: Gastropoda
- Subclass: Caenogastropoda
- Order: Littorinimorpha
- Family: Littorinidae
- Subfamily: Laevilitorininae
- Genus: Laevilacunaria; A.W.B. Powell, 1951

Type species
- Pellilotorina bransfieldensis Preston, 1916

Genus of gastropods

Laevilacunaria is a genus of sea snails, marine gastropod molluscs in the family Littorinidae, the winkles or periwinkles.

== Species ==
Species within the genus Laevilacunaria include:

- Laevilacunaria antarctica (Martens, 1885)
- Laevilacunaria bennetti (Preston, 1916)
- Laevilacunaria pumilio (E. A. Smith, 1877)

Species brought into synonymy

- Laevilacunaria benetti [sic]: synonym of Laevilacunaria bennetti (Preston, 1916)
- Laevilacunaria bransfieldensis (Preston, 1916): synonym of Laevilacunaria antarctica (Martens, 1885)
