= Laevilitorina alta =

Scientific classification
- Kingdom: Animalia
- Phylum: Mollusca
- Class: Gastropoda
- Subclass: Caenogastropoda
- Order: Littorinimorpha
- Family: Littorinidae
- Genus: Laevilitorina
- Species: L. alta

Binomial name
- Laevilitorina alta (Powell, 1940)

Species of gastropod

Laevilitorina alta is a species of sea snail, a marine gastropod mollusk in the family Littorinidae, the winkles or periwinkles.
