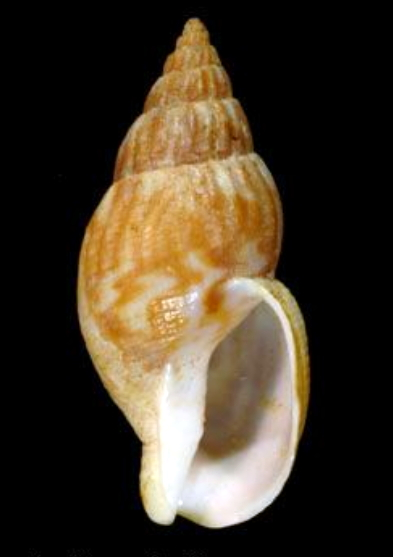
- Shell of Amphissa columbiana (specimen at the Natural History Museum, Rotterdam)

Scientific classification
- Kingdom: Animalia
- Phylum: Mollusca
- Class: Gastropoda
- Subclass: Caenogastropoda
- Order: Neogastropoda
- Family: Columbellidae
- Genus: Amphissa
- Species: A. columbiana

Binomial name
- Amphissa columbiana Dall, 1916

Synonyms
- Amphissa columbiana altior Dall, 1921; Amphissa columbiana columbiana Dall, 1916; Amphissa corrugata (Reeve, 1847); Buccinum corrugatum Reeve, 1847 (Invalid: junior homonym of Buccinum corrugatum Brocchi, 1814; Amphissa columbiana is a replacement name); Columbella valga Cooper, 1860 (Invalid: junior homonym of Columbella valga Gould, 1850)

= Amphissa columbiana =

Species of gastropod

Amphissa columbiana, known as the wrinkled dove snail, wrinkled amphissa, or Columbian amphissa, is a species of sea snail, a marine gastropod mollusc in the family Columbellidae, the dove snails.

== Description ==
The length of the shell attains 20 mm.

== Distribution ==
This species is native to the western coast of North America, from California to Alaska.
