= Laevilitorina heardensis =

Scientific classification
- Kingdom: Animalia
- Phylum: Mollusca
- Class: Gastropoda
- Subclass: Caenogastropoda
- Order: Littorinimorpha
- Family: Littorinidae
- Genus: Laevilitorina
- Species: L. heardensis

Binomial name
- Laevilitorina heardensis Dell, 1964

Synonyms
- Laevilitorina (Corneolitorina) heardensis Dell, 1964

Species of gastropod

Laevilitorina heardensis is a species of sea snail, a marine gastropod mollusk in the family Littorinidae, the winkles or periwinkles.
