= Laevilitorina delli =

Scientific classification
- Kingdom: Animalia
- Phylum: Mollusca
- Class: Gastropoda
- Subclass: Caenogastropoda
- Order: Littorinimorpha
- Family: Littorinidae
- Genus: Laevilitorina
- Species: L. delli

Binomial name
- Laevilitorina delli (Powell, 1955)

Species of gastropod

Laevilitorina delli is a species of sea snail, a marine gastropod mollusk in the family Littorinidae, the winkles or periwinkles.
