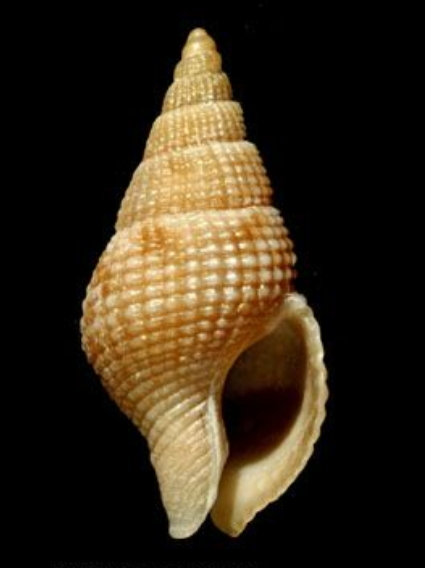
- Shell of Amphissa acuminata (specimen at the Natural History Museum Rotterdam)

Scientific classification
- Kingdom: Animalia
- Phylum: Mollusca
- Class: Gastropoda
- Subclass: Caenogastropoda
- Order: Neogastropoda
- Family: Columbellidae
- Genus: Amphissa
- Species: A. acuminata

Binomial name
- Amphissa acuminata (E. A. Smith, 1915)

Synonyms
- Glypteuthria acuminata E. A. Smith, 1915 (original combination)

= Amphissa acuminata =

Species of gastropod

Amphissa acuminata is a species of sea snail, a marine gastropod mollusc in the family Columbellidae, the dove snails.

== Description ==
The length of the shell attains 15 mm its diameter 5.5 mm.

(Original description) The shell is slender, with a long acuminate spire, appearing dirty whitish and spotted irregularly with a light reddish color. Comprising eight and a half whorls, the first one and a half are smooth, rounded, and pale brown, forming a mammillated apex. The following whorls are almost flat at the sides, increasing slowly and regularly, and are sculptured with slightly curved longitudinal fine costae and spiral lirae. The points of intersection form small rounded nodules; there are about twenty-six costae on the penultimate whorl, and six or seven lirae. The body whorl is contracted below the middle, beneath which the shell is scarcely affected by the longitudinal costae, so that the transverse lirae are smooth and not nodulous. The aperture is narrow and suboval; the outer lip is thin at the edge, a little thickened exteriorly, with about seven slender, short lirae within, a short distance from the margin. The columella is arcuate above, oblique below, and is covered with a thin callus.

== Distribution ==
This species occurs near the Falkland Islands, South Atlantic Ocean.
