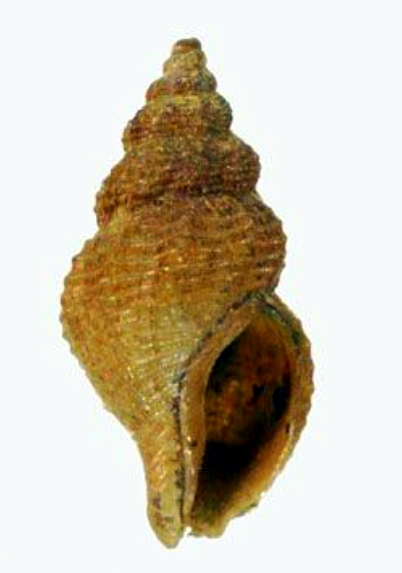
- Shell of Amphissa undata (specimen at the Natural History Museum, Rotterdam)

Scientific classification
- Kingdom: Animalia
- Phylum: Mollusca
- Class: Gastropoda
- Subclass: Caenogastropoda
- Order: Neogastropoda
- Family: Columbellidae
- Genus: Amphissa
- Species: A. undata

Binomial name
- Amphissa undata (P. P. Carpenter, 1864)

Synonyms
- † Amphissa ventricosa Arnold, 1903; Amycla undata P. P. Carpenter, 1864 superseded combination

= Amphissa undata =

Species of gastropod

Amphissa undata is a species of sea snail, a marine gastropod mollusc in the family Columbellidae, the dove snails.

== Description ==
(Original description in Latin) The shell is small, reddish-brown, and turreted, covered with a thin epidermis. Its spire margins are nearly straight. The four nuclear whorls are smooth and swollen, forming a mammillated apex. The five normal whorls are very swollen, with impressed sutures. Nine very swollen, broad radial ribs are present, becoming obsolescent anteriorly and posteriorly, with wavy interspaces. The spiral lirae are more acute and distant, surpassing the ribs, and elegantly undulate along the interspaces; six to eight of these are shown on the spire. The aperture is oval, extended into a short, straight siphonal canal, and is not lirate within. The outer lip is acute, joined to an acute, projecting labium at the suture. The columella is flattened. The operculum is nassoid.

== Distribution ==
This species is occurs from Monterey Bay, California, to Asunción Island, Baja California.
