= Laevilitorina caliginosa =

Scientific classification
- Kingdom: Animalia
- Phylum: Mollusca
- Class: Gastropoda
- Subclass: Caenogastropoda
- Order: Littorinimorpha
- Family: Littorinidae
- Genus: Laevilitorina
- Species: L. caliginosa

Binomial name
- Laevilitorina caliginosa (Gould, 1849)

Synonyms
- Hydrobia caliginosa Gould, 1849; Laevilitorina coriacea (Melvill & Standen, 1907); Laevilitorina elongata Pelseneer, 1903; Littorina caliginosa Gould, 1849 (original combination); Littorina coriacea Melvill & Standen, 1907 (original combination)

Species of gastropod

Laevilitorina caliginosa is a species of sea snail, a marine gastropod mollusk in the family Littorinidae, the winkles or periwinkles.

== Description ==
The maximum recorded shell length is 8 mm.

== Habitat ==
Minimum recorded depth is 0 m. Maximum recorded depth is 40 m.
