= Amphissa inopinata =

Scientific classification
- Kingdom: Animalia
- Phylum: Mollusca
- Class: Gastropoda
- Subclass: Caenogastropoda
- Order: Neogastropoda
- Family: Columbellidae
- Genus: Amphissa
- Species: A. inopinata

Binomial name
- Amphissa inopinata K. Monsecour & D. Monsecour, 2024

Species of gastropod

Amphissa inopinata is a species of sea snail, a marine gastropod mollusc in the family Columbellidae, the dove snails.

== Distribution ==
This species is occurs in the Atlantic Ocean off São Paulo, Brazil.
