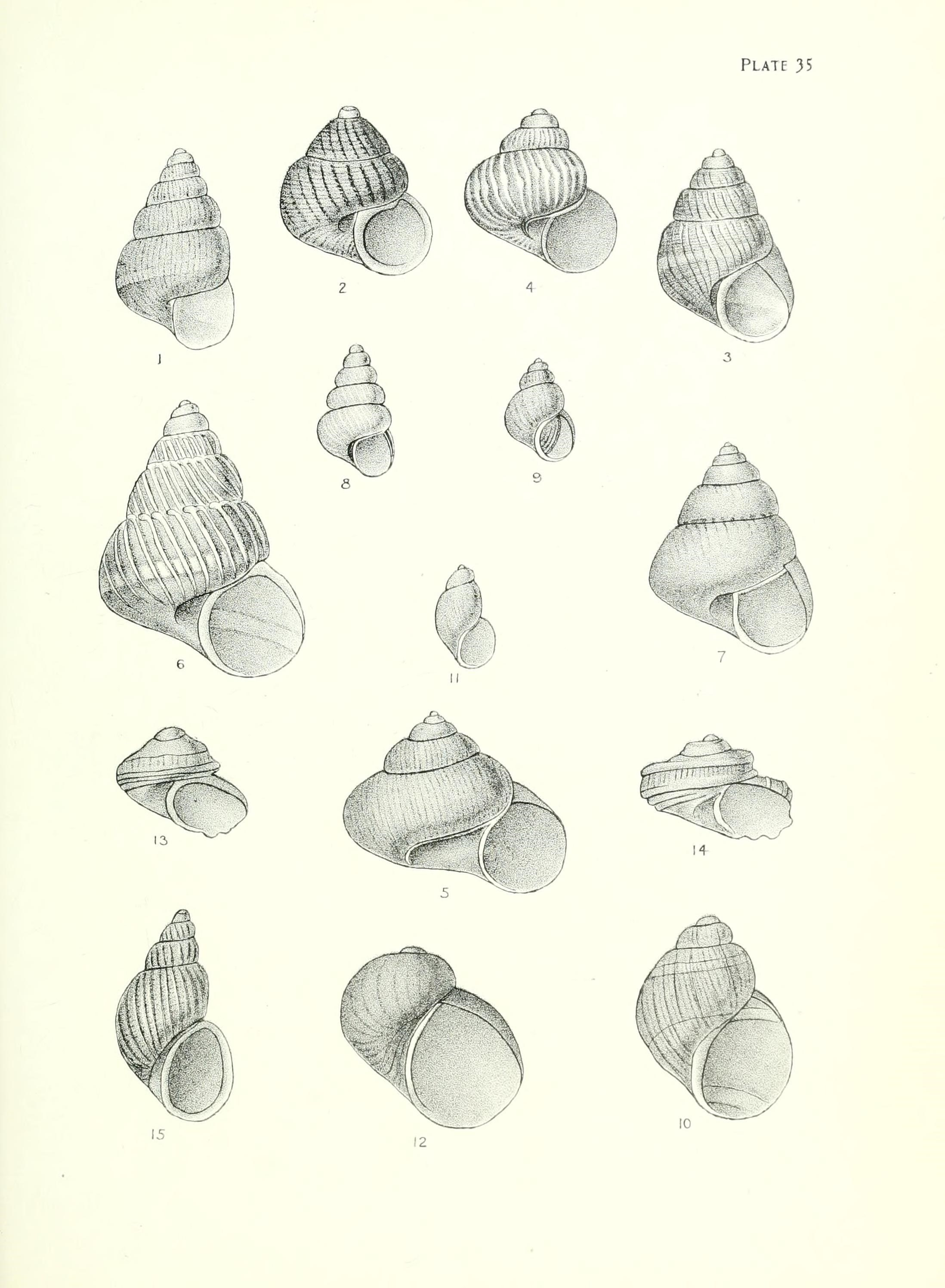
- Fig 10

Scientific classification
- Kingdom: Animalia
- Phylum: Mollusca
- Class: Gastropoda
- Subclass: Caenogastropoda
- Order: Littorinimorpha
- Family: Littorinidae
- Genus: Laevilitorina
- Species: L. bifasciata

Binomial name
- Laevilitorina bifasciata Suter, 1913

= Laevilitorina bifasciata =

Species of gastropod

Laevilitorina bifasciata is a species of sea snail, a marine gastropod mollusk in the family Littorinidae, the winkles or periwinkles. It was first described by Henry Suter in 1913.
