= Lacuna lepidula =

Scientific classification
- Kingdom: Animalia
- Phylum: Mollusca
- Class: Gastropoda
- Subclass: Caenogastropoda
- Order: Littorinimorpha
- Family: Littorinidae
- Genus: Lacuna
- Species: L. lepidula

Binomial name
- Lacuna lepidula A. Adams, 1863

Species of gastropod

Lacuna lepidula is a species of sea snail, a marine gastropod mollusk in the family Littorinidae, the winkles or periwinkles.
