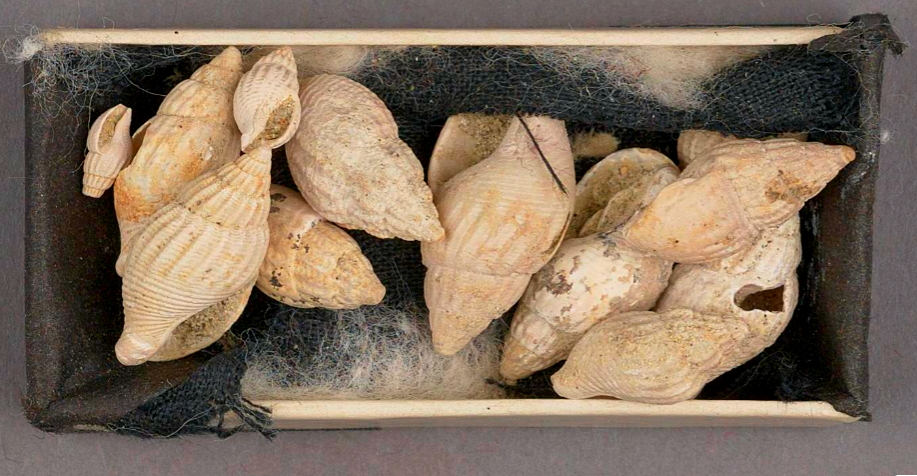
- Shells of Amphissa reticulata (specimens at the Smithsonian Institution)

Scientific classification
- Kingdom: Animalia
- Phylum: Mollusca
- Class: Gastropoda
- Subclass: Caenogastropoda
- Order: Neogastropoda
- Family: Columbellidae
- Genus: Amphissa
- Species: A. reticulata

Binomial name
- Amphissa reticulata Dall, 1916

Synonyms
- Amphissa versicolor var. reticulata Dall, 1916 superseded combination

= Amphissa reticulata =

Species of gastropod

Amphissa reticulata is a species of sea snail, a marine gastropod mollusc in the family Columbellidae, the dove snails.

== Description ==
The length of the shell attains 17 mm.

(original description) The shell is of a uniform whitish color. It has a very acute spire, and shows fine regular corded spiral sculpture crossed by about 17 nearly straight axial narrow ribs.

== Distribution ==
This species is occurs from Kodiak Island, Alaska, to Islas San Benito, Baja California at depths between 15 m and 300 m.
