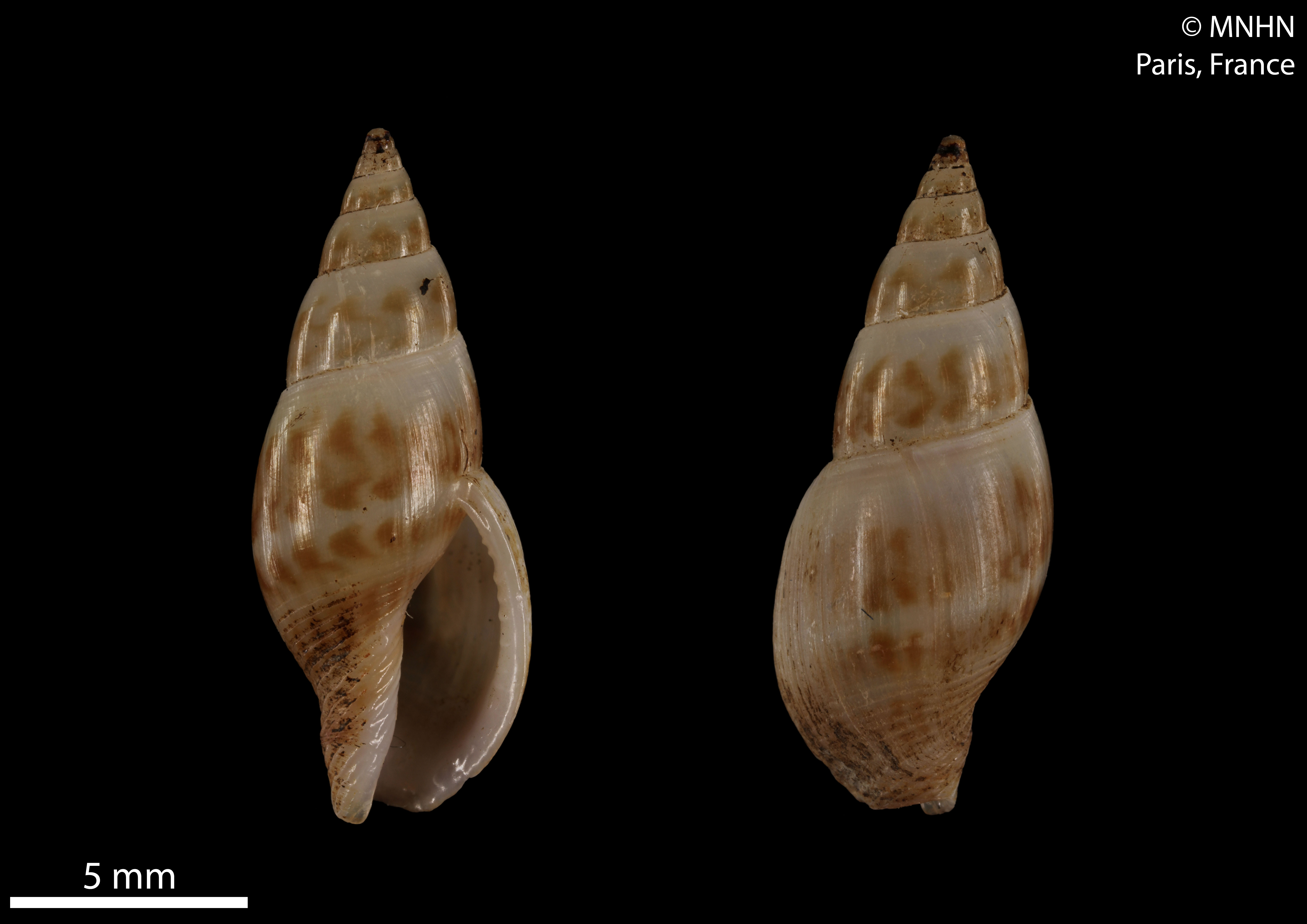
- Shell of Cosmioconcha nitens (specimen at MNHN, Paris)

Scientific classification
- Kingdom: Animalia
- Phylum: Mollusca
- Class: Gastropoda
- Subclass: Caenogastropoda
- Order: Neogastropoda
- Family: Columbellidae
- Genus: Cosmioconcha
- Species: C. nitens

Binomial name
- Cosmioconcha nitens (C. B. Adams, 1850)

Synonyms
- Anachis (Costoanachis) plicatula Dunker, R.W., 1853; Buccinum plicatulum Dunker, 1853; Columbella perpicta Dall, 1901

= Cosmioconcha nitens =

Species of gastropod

Cosmioconcha nitens, common name: the shiny dove shell, is a species of sea snail, a marine gastropod mollusk in the family Columbellidae.

== Description ==
Adult shells of Cosmioconcha nitens range from 7 to 17 mm in length. The species has a multispiral protoconch, a relatively long aperture, and a smooth shell surface except for spiral cords at the base of the final whorl. It also lacks a conspicuous columellar denticle, distinguishing it from some related species.

== Taxonomy ==
Originally named Fusus Nitens by C.B Adams in 1850. It was subsequently transferred to the genus Cosmioconcha, resulting in the accepted combination Cosmioconcha nitens. The names Buccinum plicatulum Dunker, 1853 and Columbella perpicta Dall & C. T. Simpson, 1901 are currently regarded as unaccepted synonyms of the species, with the former treated as a junior subjective synonym.

== Distribution ==
This species occurs in the Gulf of Mexico and the Caribbean Sea; in the Atlantic Ocean off Brazil.
