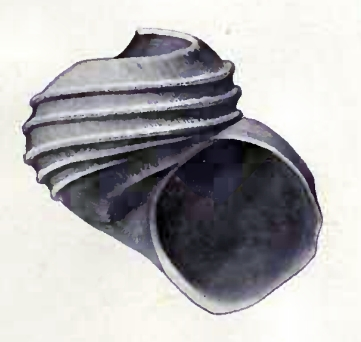
- Trilirata macmurdensis (Hedley, 1911); family Zerotulidae

Scientific classification
- Kingdom: Animalia
- Phylum: Mollusca
- Class: Gastropoda
- Subclass: Caenogastropoda
- Order: Littorinimorpha
- Family: Zerotulidae
- Genus: Trilirata
- Species: T. macmurdensis

Binomial name
- Trilirata macmurdensis (Hedley, 1911)

Synonyms
- Lacuna macmurdensis Hedley, 1911 (basionym); Prolacuna macmurdensis (Hedley, 1911); Sublacuna trilirata Thiele, 1912

= Trilirata macmurdensis =

Species of gastropod

Trilirata macmurdensis is a species of predatory sea snail, a marine gastropod mollusk in the family Zerotulidae.

== Description ==
The maximum recorded shell length is 2.5 mm.

== Habitat ==
Minimum recorded depth is 270 m. Maximum recorded depth is 280 m.

Its distribution appears restricted to the Southern Ocean.

== History ==
The mollusk was first described by British-born naturalist Charles Hedley in 1911, from specimens recovered from the British Antarctic Expedition (1907–1909)
