= Ersilia mediterranea =

Scientific classification
- Kingdom: Animalia
- Phylum: Mollusca
- Class: Gastropoda
- Subclass: Caenogastropoda
- Order: Littorinimorpha
- Family: Eulimidae
- Genus: Ersilia
- Species: E. mediterranea

Binomial name
- Ersilia mediterranea Monterosato, 1869

Synonyms
- Lacuna mediterranea Monterosato, 1869

Species of gastropod

Lacuna mediterranea is a species of sea snail, a marine gastropod mollusk in the family Eulimidae. This species is one of two known species to exist within the genus, Ersilia, the other species is Ersilia stancyki. As the name suggests, this species is mainly distributed throughout European waters off the coasts of the Iberian Peninsula.

== Description ==
The shell measures approximately 2 mm in length.

== Distribution ==
This species occurs in the following locations:

- European waters (ERMS scope)
- Portuguese Exclusive Economic Zone
- Spanish Exclusive Economic Zone
