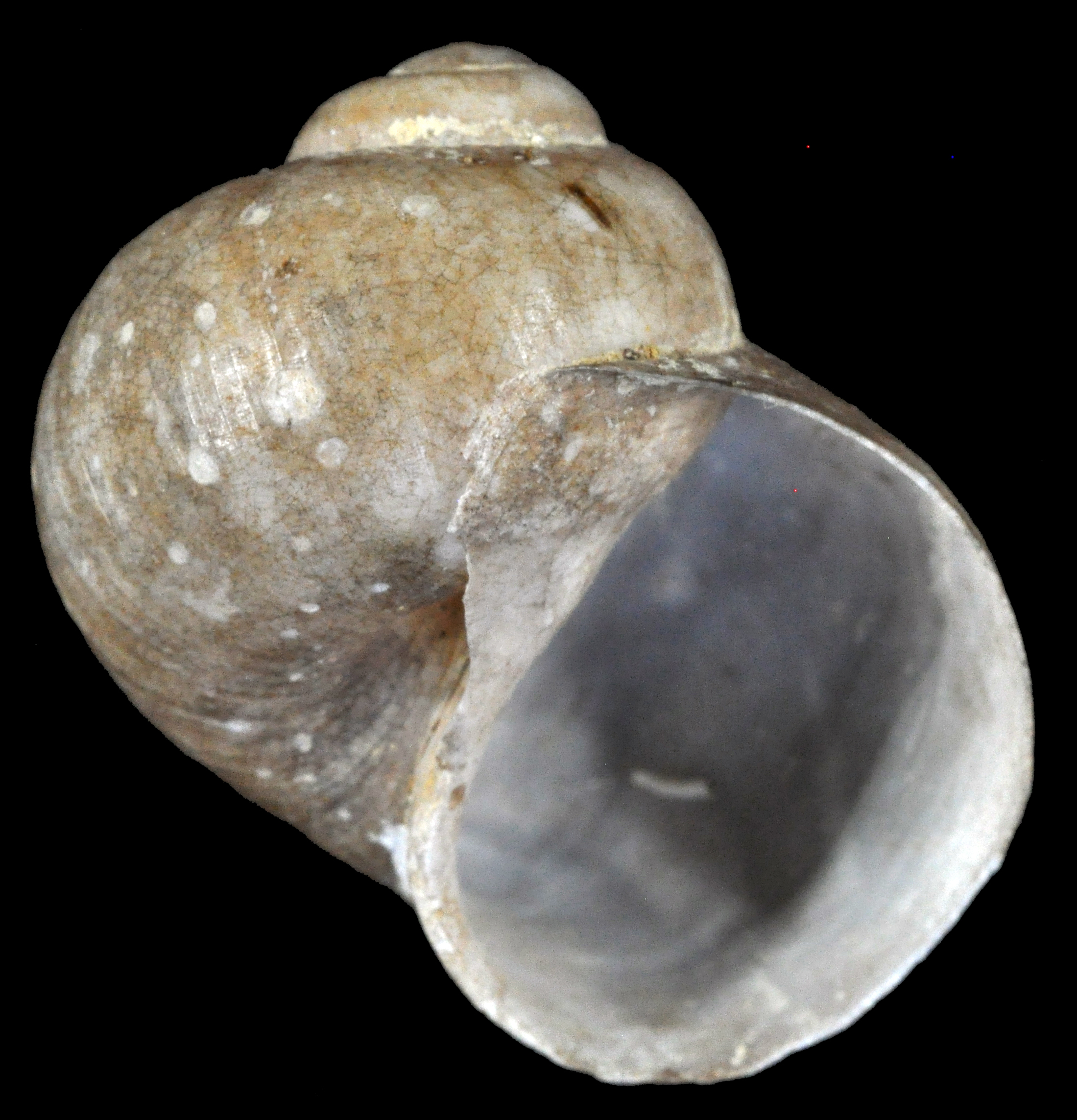
- Shell of Pseudonatica ampullarica (holotype at MNHN, Paris)

Scientific classification
- Kingdom: Animalia
- Phylum: Mollusca
- Class: Gastropoda
- Subclass: Caenogastropoda
- Order: Littorinimorpha
- Superfamily: Littorinoidea
- Family: Zerotulidae
- Genus: Pseudonatica; Simone, 2018

Type species
- Pseudonatica antarctica Simone, 2018

= Pseudonatica =

Genus of gastropods

Pseudonatica is a genus of predatory sea snails, marine gastropod mollusks in the family Zerotulidae.

== Species ==
- Pseudonatica ampullarica Simone, 2018
- Pseudonatica antarctica Simone, 2018
