= Lacuna uchidai =

Scientific classification
- Kingdom: Animalia
- Phylum: Mollusca
- Class: Gastropoda
- Subclass: Caenogastropoda
- Order: Littorinimorpha
- Family: Littorinidae
- Genus: Lacuna
- Species: L. uchidai

Binomial name
- Lacuna uchidai (Habe, 1953)

Species of gastropod

Lacuna uchidai is a species of sea snail, a marine gastropod mollusk in the family Littorinidae, the winkles or periwinkles.
