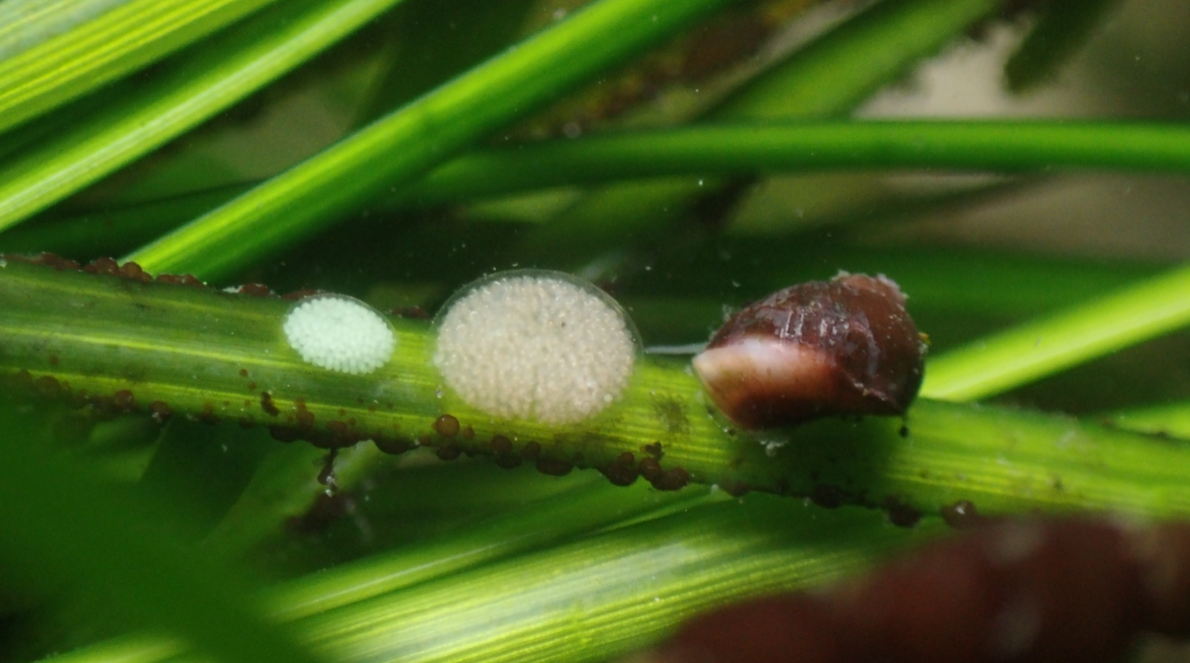
- L. marmorata adult and embryos in Bodega Bay.

Scientific classification
- Kingdom: Animalia
- Phylum: Mollusca
- Class: Gastropoda
- Subclass: Caenogastropoda
- Order: Littorinimorpha
- Family: Littorinidae
- Genus: Lacuna
- Species: L. marmorata

Binomial name
- Lacuna marmorata Dall, 1919

= Lacuna marmorata =

Species of gastropod

Lacuna marmorata is a species of sea snail, a marine gastropod mollusk in the family Littorinidae, the winkles or periwinkles.

== Description ==
Lacuna marmorata has 6 described color morphs, most of which are variations of brown with white stripes. Many of these patterns are not distinct from Lacuna unifasciata. It has a radula typical of littorinids with pointed teeth, distinguishing it from the relatively flat teeth of L. unifasciata. Lacuna marmorata can also be distinguished by its more spherical shell with a smaller aperture.

== Reproduction ==
Like other species in the genus (namely Lacuna unifasciata), this species lays benthic egg capsules on blades of surfgrass and algae. The females of this species can store sperm to produce fertilized eggs without mating. Sperm retention has been documented to last as long as 60 days.
