= Laevilitorina macphersonae =

Scientific classification
- Kingdom: Animalia
- Phylum: Mollusca
- Class: Gastropoda
- Subclass: Caenogastropoda
- Order: Littorinimorpha
- Family: Littorinidae
- Genus: Laevilitorina
- Species: L. macphersonae

Binomial name
- Laevilitorina macphersonae (Dell, 1964)

Species of gastropod

Laevilitorina macphersonae is a species of sea snail, a marine gastropod mollusk in the family Littorinidae, the winkles or periwinkles.

This species has become a synonym of Macquariella macphersonae Dell, 1964
