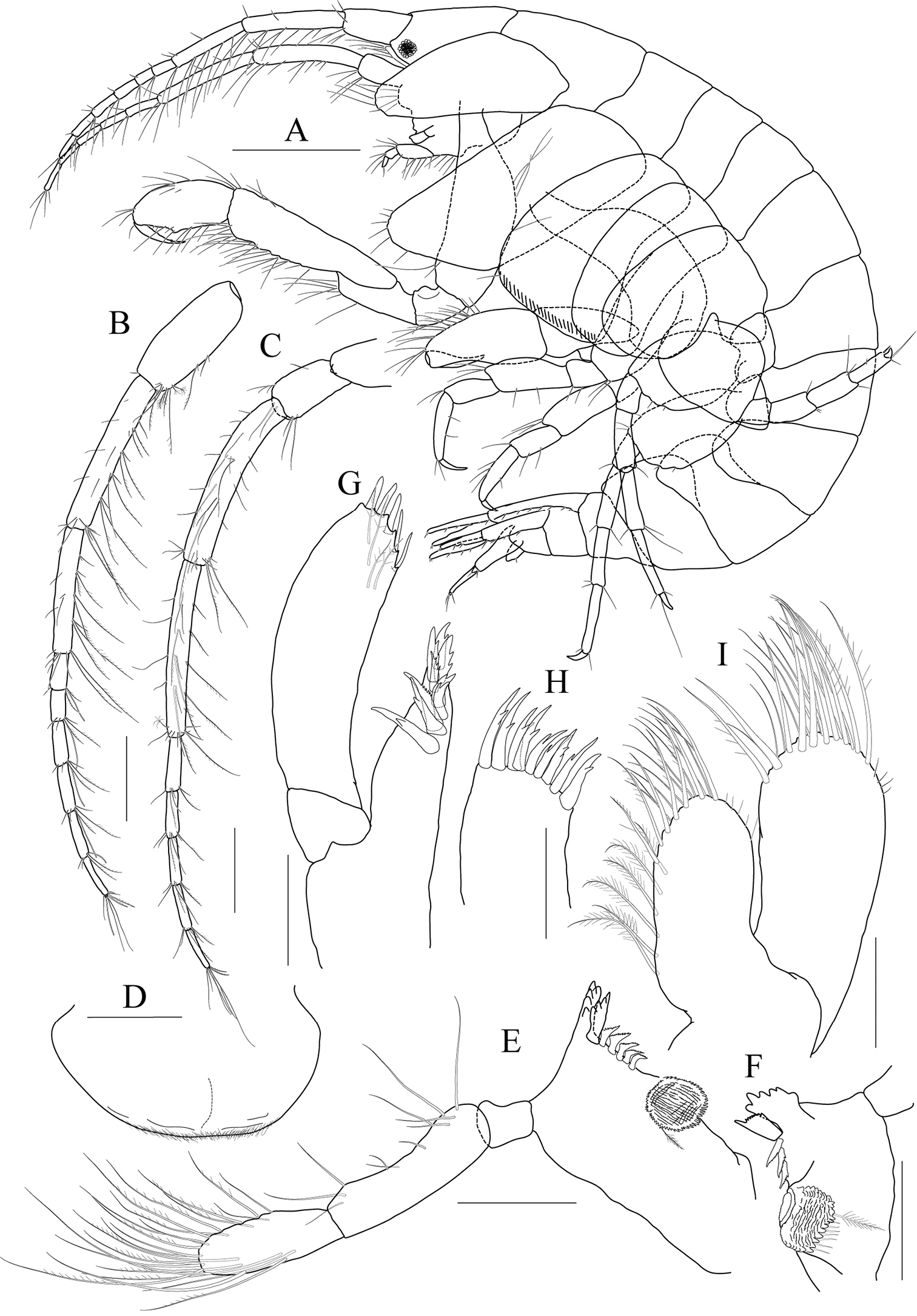
- Photis longicaudata

Scientific classification
- Domain: Eukaryota
- Kingdom: Animalia
- Phylum: Arthropoda
- Class: Malacostraca
- Order: Amphipoda
- Family: Photidae
- Genus: Photis; Krøyer, 1842

Type species
- Photis reinhardi Krøyer, 1842

= Photis =

Genus of crustaceans

Photis is a genus of amphipod crustaceans, containing the following species:

- Photis aequimanus Schellenberg, 1925
- Photis africana Schellenberg, 1925
- Photis aina J. L. Barnard, 1970
- Photis albus Budnikova, 1985
- Photis angustimanus Ren, 2006
- Photis antennata Chevreux, 1926
- Photis ariakensis (Hirayama, 1984)
- Photis baeckmannae Gurjanova, 1951
- Photis beringiensis Tzvetkova, 1980
- Photis bifurcata J. L. Barnard, 1962
- Photis brevicaudatus (Norman, 1867)
- Photis brevipes Shoemaker, 1942
- Photis californica Stout, 1913
- Photis cavimana Ledoyer, 1979
- Photis chiconola J. L. Barnard, 1964
- Photis coeca J. L. Barnard, 1962
- Photis conchicola Alderman, 1936
- Photis davei Myers, 2009
- Photis dentata Shoemaker, 1945
- Photis dolichommata Stebbing, 1910
- Photis elephantis J. L. Barnard, 1962
- Photis fischmanni Gurjanova, 1951
- Photis goreensis Schellenberg, 1925
- Photis hawaiensis J. L. Barnard, 1955
- Photis inornatus Myers et al., 2012
- Photis japonica Hirayama, 1984
- Photis kapapa J. L. Barnard, 1970
- Photis kurilica Gurjanova, 1955
- Photis lacia J. L. Barnard, 1962
- Photis lamellifera Schellenberg, 1928
- Photis lamina Hirayama, 1984
- Photis linearmanus Conlan, 1994
- Photis longicaudata (Bate & Westwood, 1862)
- Photis longidactyla Griffiths, 1974
- Photis longimana Walker, 1904
- Photis longipes (Della Valle, 1893)
- Photis macinerneyi Conlan, 1983
- Photis macrocarpa Stebbing, 1888
- Photis macromana McKinney et al., 1978
- Photis macrotica J. L. Barnard, 1962
- Photis malinalco J. L. Barnard, 1967
- Photis melanica McKinney, 1980
- Photis nana (Walker, 1904)
- Photis nataliae Bulycheva, 1952
- Photis nigricola Lowry, 1979
- Photis obesa Chevreux, 1926
- Photis oligochaeta Conlan, 1983
- Photis pachydactyla Conlan, 1983
- Photis paeowai Myers, 1995
- Photis parvidons Conlan, 1983
- Photis phaeocula Lowry, 1979
- Photis pirloti Myers, 1985
- Photis pollex Walker, 1895
- Photis producta (Stimpson, 1856)
- Photis pugnator Shoemaker, 1945
- Photis reinhardi Krøyer, 1842
- Photis serae Souza-Filho & Serejo, 2010
- Photis sinensis Ren, 2006
- Photis spasskii Gurjanova, 1951
- Photis spinicarpa Shoemaker, 1942
- Photis strelkovi Gurjanova, 1953
- Photis tenuicornis Sars, 1882
- Photis tropherus Thomas & J. L. Barnard, 1991
- Photis typhlops Conlan, 1994
- Photis uncinata K. H. Barnard, 1932
- Photis vinogradovi Gurjanova, 1951
- Photis viuda J. L. Barnard, 1962
- Photis zhujiangensis Ren, 2006
