= Laevilitorina antipodum =

Scientific classification
- Kingdom: Animalia
- Phylum: Mollusca
- Class: Gastropoda
- Subclass: Caenogastropoda
- Order: Littorinimorpha
- Family: Littorinidae
- Genus: Laevilitorina
- Species: L. antipodum

Binomial name
- Laevilitorina antipodum (Filhol, 1880)

Synonyms
- Assiminea antipodum Filhol, 1880

Species of gastropod

Laevilitorina antipodum is a species of sea snail, a marine gastropod mollusk in the family Littorinidae, the winkles or periwinkles.
