= Streptocionella pluralis =

Scientific classification
- Kingdom: Animalia
- Phylum: Mollusca
- Class: Gastropoda
- Family: Pyramidellidae
- Genus: Streptocionella
- Species: S. pluralis

Binomial name
- Streptocionella pluralis Dell, 1990

Species of gastropod

Streptocionella pluralis is a species of sea snail, a marine gastropod mollusk in the family Pyramidellidae, the pyrams and their allies.
