= Cosmioconcha geigeri =

Scientific classification
- Kingdom: Animalia
- Phylum: Mollusca
- Class: Gastropoda
- Subclass: Caenogastropoda
- Order: Neogastropoda
- Family: Columbellidae
- Genus: Cosmioconcha
- Species: C. geigeri

Binomial name
- Cosmioconcha geigeri Garcia, 2006

Species of gastropod

Cosmioconcha geigeri is a species of sea snail, a marine gastropod mollusc in the family Columbellidae, the dove snails.
