= Amphissa cancellata =

Scientific classification
- Kingdom: Animalia
- Phylum: Mollusca
- Class: Gastropoda
- Subclass: Caenogastropoda
- Order: Neogastropoda
- Family: Columbellidae
- Genus: Amphissa
- Species: A. cancellata

Binomial name
- Amphissa cancellata (Castellanos, 1979)

Synonyms
- Anachis cancellata Castellanos, 1979 (original combination)

Species of gastropod

Amphissa cancellata is a species of sea snail, a marine gastropod mollusc in the family Columbellidae, the dove snails.

== Distribution ==
This species occurs from Brazil to Argentine, Southern Atlantic Ocean.
