= Laevilitorina wandelensis =

Scientific classification
- Kingdom: Animalia
- Phylum: Mollusca
- Class: Gastropoda
- Subclass: Caenogastropoda
- Order: Littorinimorpha
- Family: Littorinidae
- Genus: Laevilitorina
- Species: L. wandelensis

Binomial name
- Laevilitorina wandelensis (Lamy, 1905)

Synonyms
- Lacuna notorcadensis Melvill & Standen, 1907

Species of gastropod

Laevilitorina wandelensis is a species of sea snail, a marine gastropod mollusk in the family Littorinidae, the winkles or periwinkles.

== Description ==
The maximum recorded shell length is 3 mm.

== Habitat ==
Minimum recorded depth is 18 m. Maximum recorded depth is 391 m.
