= Laevilacunaria pumilio =

Scientific classification
- Kingdom: Animalia
- Phylum: Mollusca
- Class: Gastropoda
- Subclass: Caenogastropoda
- Order: Littorinimorpha
- Family: Littorinidae
- Genus: Laevilacunaria
- Species: L. pumilio

Binomial name
- Laevilacunaria pumilio (Smith, 1875)

Synonyms
- Hydrobia pumilio E. A. Smith, 1875 (original combination); Laevilitorina pumilio (E. A. Smith, 1875)

Species of gastropod

Laevilacunaria pumilio is a species of sea snail, a marine gastropod mollusc in the family Littorinidae, the winkles or periwinkles.
