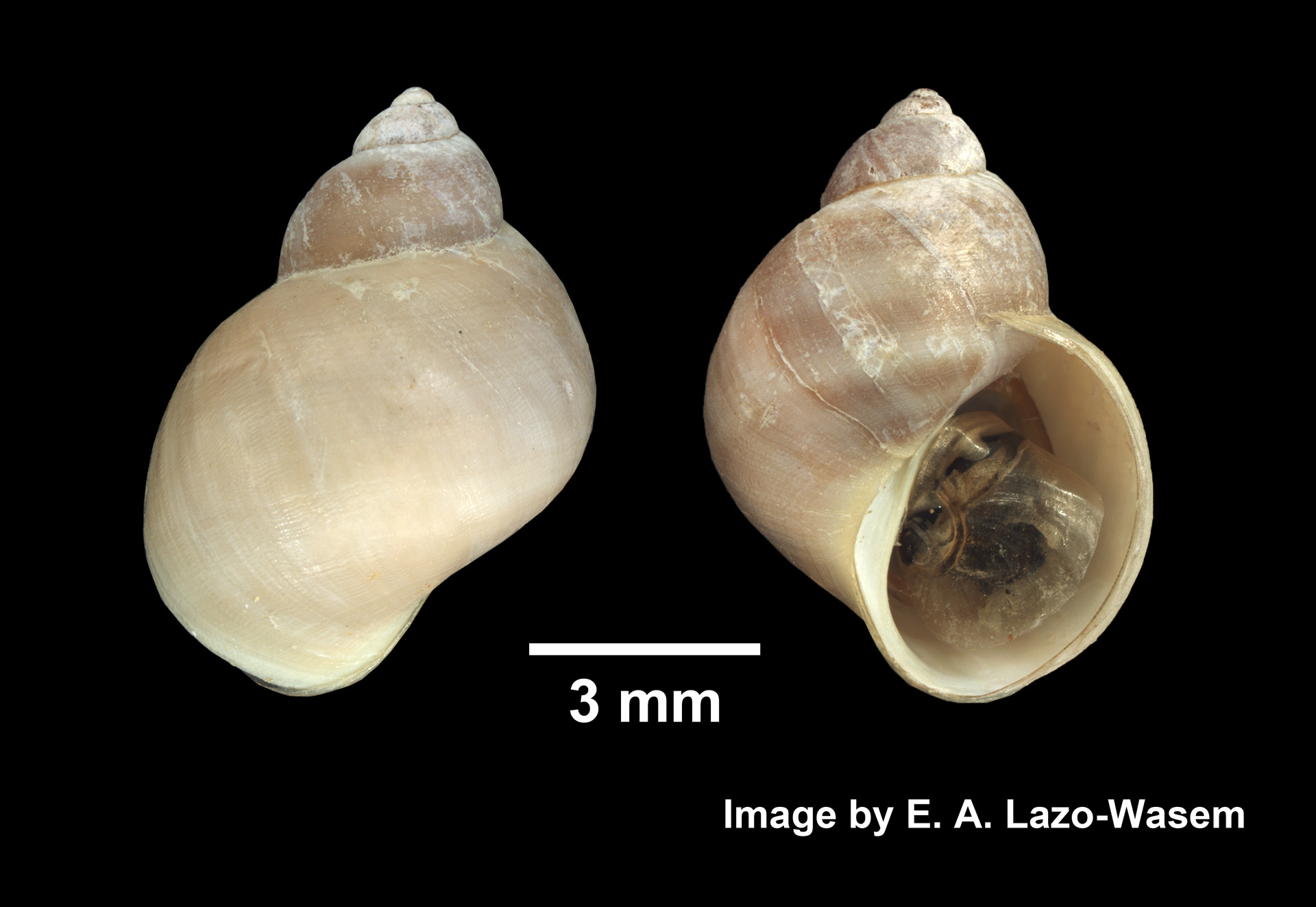

Scientific classification
- Kingdom: Animalia
- Phylum: Mollusca
- Class: Gastropoda
- Subclass: Caenogastropoda
- Order: Littorinimorpha
- Family: Littorinidae
- Genus: Lacuna
- Species: L. vincta

Binomial name
- Lacuna vincta (Montagu, 1803)

Synonyms
- List: Epheria vincta (Montagu, 1803); Lacuna albella Lovén, 1846; Lacuna arctica Philippi, 1853; Lacuna carinata Gould, 1848; Lacuna frigida Lovén, 1846; Lacuna gracilior Metcalfe in Thorpe, 1844; Lacuna labiosa Lovén, 1846; Lacuna pertusa Conrad, 1831; Lacuna solidula Lovén, 1846; Lacuna vincta var. fusca Gould, 1841; Phasianella bifasciata Brown, 1827; Phasianella cornea Brown, 1827; Phasianella striata Brown, 1827; Trochus divaricatus Fabricius, 1780; Turbo canalis Montagu, 1803; Turbo quadrifasciatus Montagu, 1803; Turbo vinctus Montagu, 1803

= Lacuna vincta =

Species of gastropod

Lacuna vincta, commonly known as northern lacuna, wide lacuna, northern chink shell, or banded chink shell, is a species of sea snail, a marine gastropod mollusk in the family Littorinidae, the winkles or periwinkles. It is found intertidally and in shallow waters in both the northern Atlantic Ocean and the northern Pacific Ocean. It is a herbivore, feeding on seaweed and diatoms with its toothed radula.

== Description ==
The shell of Lacuna vincta is conical, with five to six smooth whorls and a pointed apex. The aperture is about half the height of the shell or slightly larger. The umbilicus has a prominent groove between two white ridges of columella. The exterior of the shell is pale brown with a broad spiral of white and a glossy periostracum. The interior of the shell is not white and pearly and the aperture can be closed by an operculum. The maximum recorded shell length is 13 mm (0.5 in).

== Distribution and habitat ==
The distribution of L. vincta is circumboreal, extending as far south in the Atlantic Ocean as the British Isles and France, and the eastern coast of North America. In the northeastern Pacific its range extends from Alaska to California, but it is seldom found further south than Washington state. It is present on algae on rocky shores, intertidally and down to about 40 m (130 ft). In the British Isles, the larvae settle preferentially on brown seaweed such as Fucus serratus and Laminaria spp. and on short red seaweed such as Lomentaria articulata, as well as on the seagrass Zostera spp. In the Pacific they settle mainly on kelp, eelgrass and surfgrass.

== Ecology ==
L. vincta is a herbivore, grazing on seaweed and on diatoms living on the surface of seagrasses. The radula has 45 to 95 rows of tiny teeth, with about three new rows being formed each day. Two separate types of teeth are produced; if the snail is grazing on seaweed, these newly formed teeth are sharply pointed and are used to tear deeply into the algal frond; if on the other hand, the snail is currently feeding on diatoms growing on seagrass, the new teeth are much blunter and are used to scrape diatoms off the leaves. The new teeth are formed at the back of the radula and work their way forward as the older teeth wear away and are discarded, so it takes some time for the snail's teeth to adjust to a change in diet.

This snail favors sheltered positions and in exposed areas seeks the shelter of crevices or dense patches of seaweed. In unsuitable conditions, such as at times of food shortage or when there are excessive numbers of predators, it can produce a string of mucus which it uses as a "parachute" to help it to drift to a more favorable location.

The sexes are separate in this snail with eggs being laid in a ring on seaweed or seagrasses. They may be laid throughout the year but in some locations, such as the British Isles, they are laid in the spring and early summer after which the adults die. The eggs hatch in about six days and the veliger larvae are planktonic for up to six months before settling on the shallow seabed at a shell-length of about 1 mm (0.04 in). In eastern Canada these juvenile snails have been recorded at a density of 1500 per square meter.
