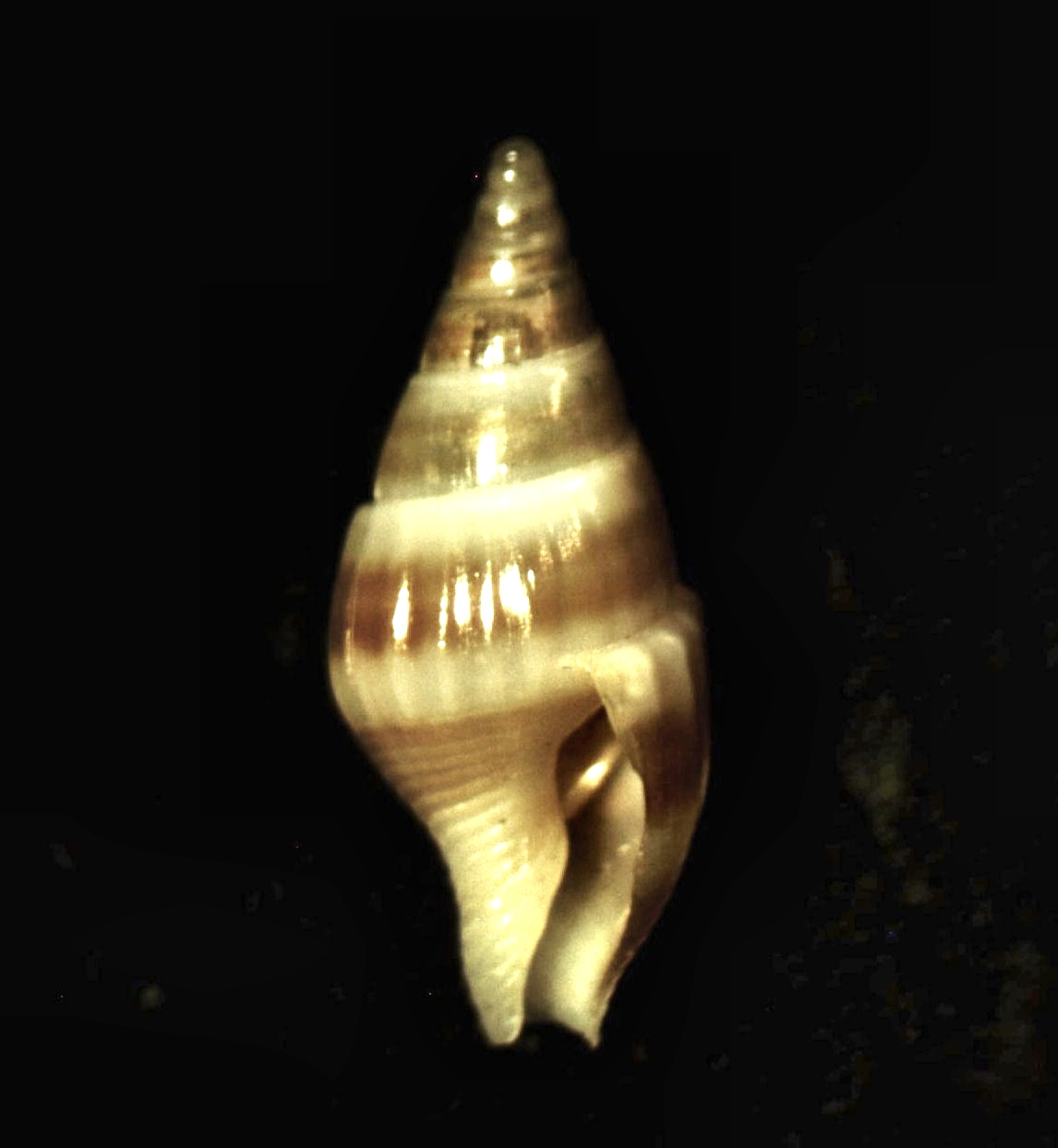
- Cosmioconcha helenae

Scientific classification
- Kingdom: Animalia
- Phylum: Mollusca
- Class: Gastropoda
- Subclass: Caenogastropoda
- Order: Neogastropoda
- Superfamily: Buccinoidea
- Family: Columbellidae
- Genus: Cosmioconcha; Dall, 1913

Type species
- Buccinum modestum Powys, 1835

= Cosmioconcha =

Genus of gastropods

Cosmioconcha is a genus of sea snails, marine gastropod mollusks in the family Columbellidae, the dove snails.

== Species ==
Species within the genus Cosmioconcha include:

- Cosmioconcha calliglypta Dall & Simpson, 1901 - America - flame dovesnail
- Cosmioconcha costattenuata Pelorce, 2017
- Cosmioconcha dedonderi Monsecour & Monsecour, 2006
- Cosmioconcha flammea Pelorce, 2017
- Cosmioconcha geigeri Garcia, 2006
- Cosmioconcha grenoni Pelorce, 2017
- Cosmioconcha helenae (Costa, 1988) (synonyms : Anachis helenae F. H. A. Costa, 1983; Costoanachis helenae (F. H. A. Costa, 1983))
- Cosmioconcha humfreyi De Jong & Coomans, 1988
- Cosmioconcha modesta Powys, 1835 - West America
- Cosmioconcha nana Garcia, 2007
- Cosmioconcha nitens (C. B. Adams, 1850) (synonyms : Columbella perpicta Dall & Simpson 1901; Astyris perpicta Dall & Simpson 1901; Mitrella perpicta Dall & Simpson, 1901 )
- Cosmioconcha palmeri W. H. Dall, 1913 - West America
- Cosmioconcha parvula W. H. Dall, 1913 - West America
- Cosmioconcha pergracilis W. H. Dall, 1913 - West America
- Cosmioconcha rehderi J. G. Hertlein & A. M. Strong, 1951 - West America
- Cosmioconcha rikae Monsecour & Monsecour, 2006
- Cosmioconcha sirderae Pelorce, 2017
