= Laevilacunaria bennetti =

Scientific classification
- Kingdom: Animalia
- Phylum: Mollusca
- Class: Gastropoda
- Subclass: Caenogastropoda
- Order: Littorinimorpha
- Family: Littorinidae
- Genus: Laevilacunaria
- Species: L. bennetti

Binomial name
- Laevilacunaria bennetti (Preston, 1916)

Synonyms
- Laevilacunaria (Pellilacunella) bennetti (Preston, 1916); Laevilacunaria benetti [sic]; Laevilitorina bennetti (Preston, 1916); Pellilitorina bennetti Preston, 1916 (original combination)

Species of gastropod

Laevilacunaria bennetti is a species of sea snail, a marine gastropod mollusc in the family Littorinidae, the winkles or periwinkles.

== Description ==
The maximum recorded shell length is 6 mm.

== Habitat ==
Minimum recorded depth is 10 m. Maximum recorded depth is 27 m.
