= Laevilitorina antarctica =

Scientific classification
- Kingdom: Animalia
- Phylum: Mollusca
- Class: Gastropoda
- Subclass: Caenogastropoda
- Order: Littorinimorpha
- Family: Littorinidae
- Genus: Laevilitorina
- Species: L. antarctica

Binomial name
- Laevilitorina antarctica (E. A. Smith, 1902)

Synonyms
- Paludestrina antarctica E. A. Smith, 1902 (original combination)

Species of gastropod

Laevilitorina antarctica is a species of sea snail, a marine gastropod mollusk in the family Littorinidae, the winkles or periwinkles.

== Description ==
The Laevilitorina antarctica has a shell size of 2.4 - 3.5 mm.

== Distribution ==
South Pacific Ocean, Antarctic ocean.
