= Dickdellia =

Scientific classification
- Kingdom: Animalia
- Phylum: Mollusca
- Class: Gastropoda
- Subclass: Caenogastropoda
- Order: Littorinimorpha
- Family: Zerotulidae
- Genus: Dickdellia; Warén & Hain, 1996
- Species: D. labioflecta

Binomial name
- Dickdellia labioflecta (Dell, 1990)

Synonyms
- Corneolitorina labioflecta (Dell, 1990); Laevilitorina labioflecta Dell, 1990 (original combination)

Genus of gastropods

Dickdellia labioflecta is a species of sea snail, a marine gastropod mollusc in the family Zerotulidae, the winkles or periwinkles. It is the only species in the genus Dickdellia.

== Description ==
The length of the shell varies between 5 mm and 7.5 mm.

== Distribution ==
This marine species occurs off the South Shetlands and in the Weddell Sea, Antarctica.
