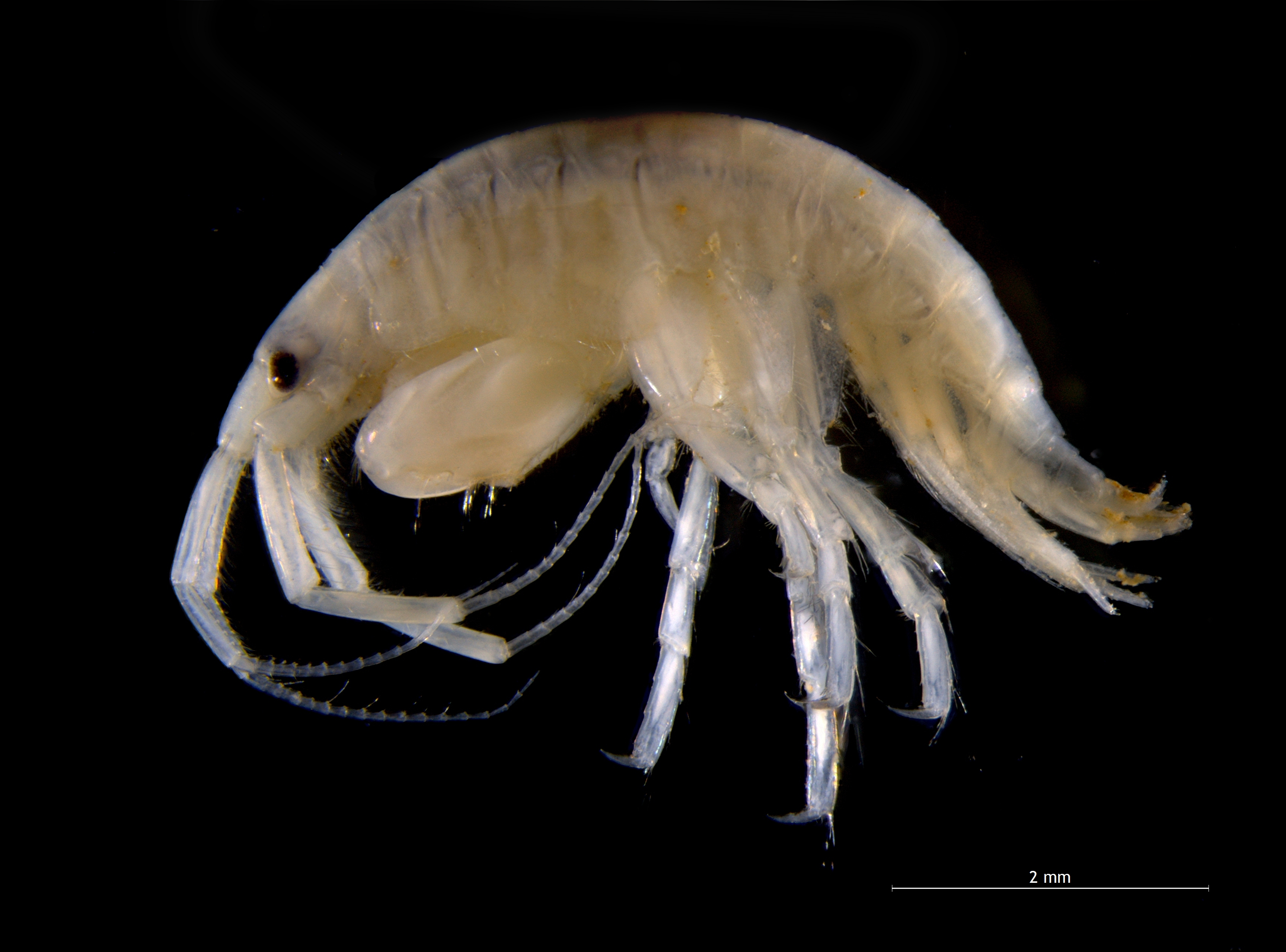
- Gammaropsis nitida

Scientific classification
- Kingdom: Animalia
- Phylum: Arthropoda
- Clade: Pancrustacea
- Class: Malacostraca
- Order: Amphipoda
- Suborder: Senticaudata
- Infraorder: Corophiida
- Parvorder: Caprellidira
- Superfamily: Photoidea
- Family: Photidae; Boeck, 1871

= Photidae =

Family of crustaceans

Photidae is a family of amphipod crustaceans, containing the following genera:

- Ampelisciphotis Pirlot, 1938
- Audulla Chevreux, 1901
- Corogammaropsis Tzvetkova, 1990
- Dodophotis G. Karaman, 1985
- Falcigammaropsis Myers, 1995
- Gammaropsis Liljeborg, 1855
- Graciliphotis Myers, 2009
- Latigammaropsis Myers, 2009
- Megamphopus Norman, 1869
- Microphotis Ruffo, 1952
- Papuaphotis Myers, 1995
- Paranaenia Chilton, 1884
- Photis Krøyer, 1842
- Podoceropsis Boeck, 1861
- Posophotis J. L. Barnard, 1979
- Rocasphotis Souza-Filho & Serejo, 2010
- Viragammaropsis Myers, 2009
