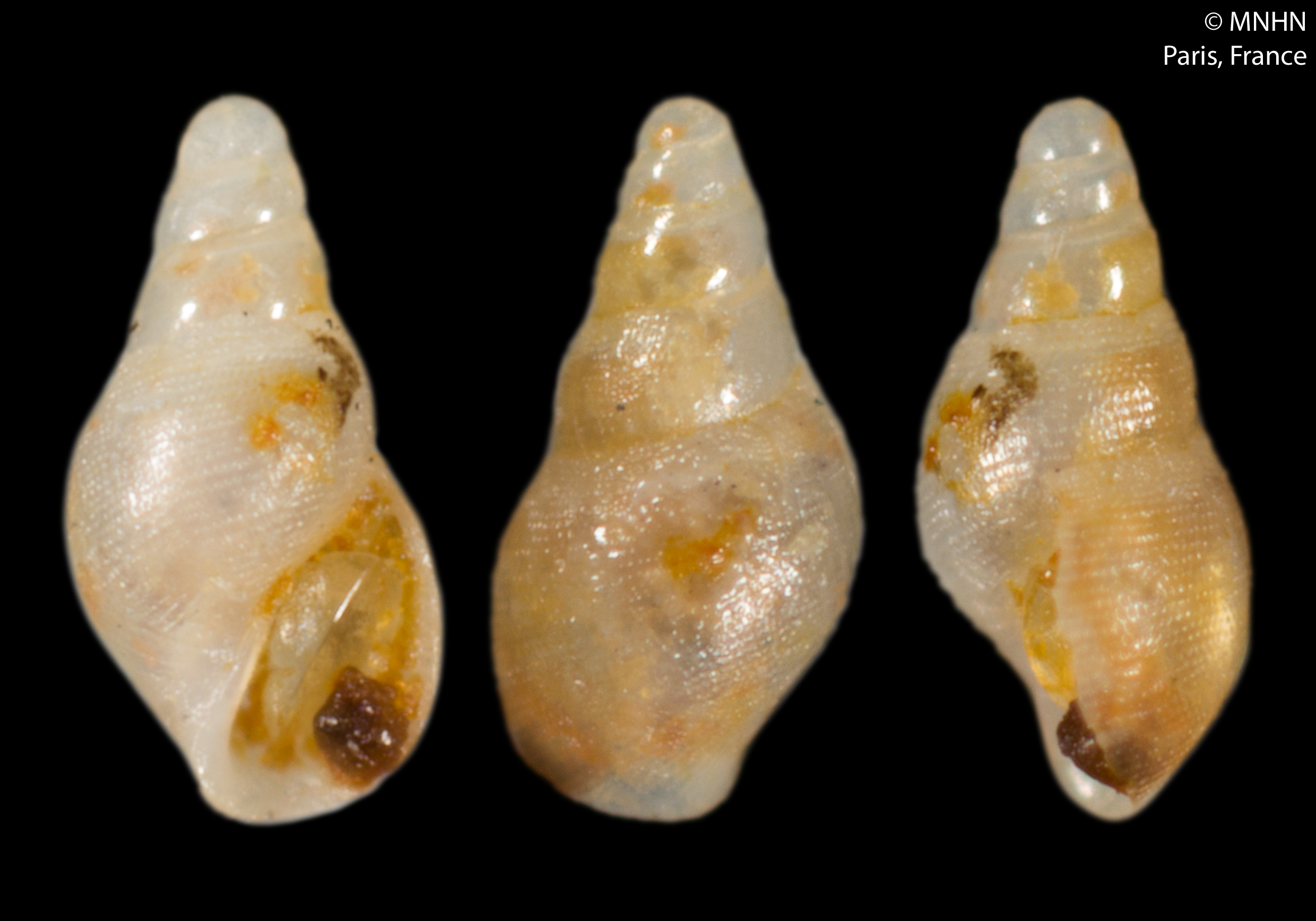
- Ersilia oligocaenica

Scientific classification
- Kingdom: Animalia
- Phylum: Mollusca
- Class: Gastropoda
- Subclass: Caenogastropoda
- Order: Littorinimorpha
- Superfamily: Vanikoroidea
- Family: Eulimidae
- Genus: Ersilia; Monterosato, 1872

Type species
- Lacuna mediterranea Monterosato, 1869

Synonyms
- Hersilia Monterosato, 1872

= Ersilia =

Genus of gastropods

Ersilia is a minor genus of minute sea snails, marine gastropod mollusks in the family Eulimidae.

== Species ==
Only two known species exist within this genus:

- Ersilia mediterranea (Monterosato, 1872)
- † Ersilia oligocaenica Lozouet, 1999
- Ersilia stancyki (Warén, 1980)
