= Ersilia stancyki =

Scientific classification
- Kingdom: Animalia
- Phylum: Mollusca
- Class: Gastropoda
- Subclass: Caenogastropoda
- Order: Littorinimorpha
- Family: Eulimidae
- Genus: Ersilia
- Species: E. stancyki

Binomial name
- Ersilia stancyki Warén, 1980

Species of gastropod

Ersilia stancyki is a species of sea snail, a marine gastropod mollusk in the family Eulimidae. This species is one of two known species to exist within the genus, Ersilia.

== Distribution ==
This species occurs in the following locations:

- Gulf of Mexico
