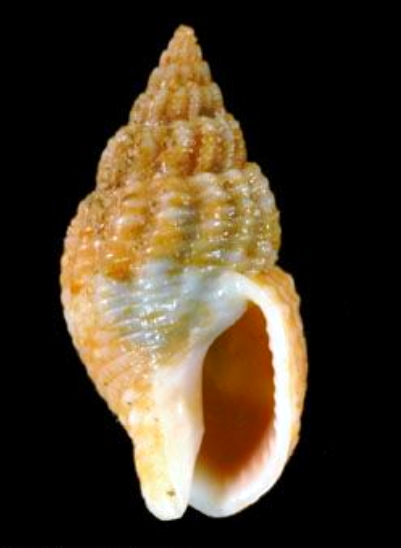
- Shell of Amphissa versicolor(specimen at the Natural History Museum, Rotterdam)

Scientific classification
- Domain: Eukaryota
- Kingdom: Animalia
- Phylum: Mollusca
- Class: Gastropoda
- Subclass: Caenogastropoda
- Order: Neogastropoda
- Family: Columbellidae
- Genus: Amphissa
- Species: A. versicolor

Binomial name
- Amphissa versicolor W. H. Dall, 1871

Synonyms
- Amphissa cymata Dall, 1916; Amphissa versicolor var. cymata Dall, 1916 junior subjective synonym; Amphissa versicolor var. incisa Dall, 1916 junior subjective synonym; Amphissa versicolor var. lineata Stearns, 1873; Amphissa versicolor versicolor Dall, 1871

= Amphissa versicolor =

Species of gastropod

Amphissa versicolor, also called variegated amphissa or variegate amphissa, is a species of small sea snail in the family Columbellidae.

== Description ==
(Original description) The shell comprises about five whorls, with the body whorl making up two-thirds of the shell's total length. The epidermis is imperceptible. The shell is ornamented with rather strong, sinuous ribs, which often extend into the lower third of the whorl; well-grown individuals possess fourteen to sixteen of these on the body whorl. These ribs are crossed by rather strong, thread-like lines, situated between broad channels on the convexity of the whorls. These lines become narrower and groove-like on the anterior part of the body whorl, with an average of seventeen present on the body whorl in adult specimens. The post-labial pinch is almost obsolete, and quite so in some specimens. The colors are highly variable, ranging from pink, salmon, livid bluish purple, brown, to pure white, all of which can be plain or variously marked with a network of white and brown lines, patches, or dots.

The shell of Amphissa versicolor is an elongated spiral that reaches up to 13 millimetres (0.51 in) in length and comes in many different colors. These colors can range from white to brown, sometimes with darker markings.

== Distribution ==
It is native to the coasts of the Eastern Pacific, from Queen Charlotte Islands, British Columbia, to Rompiente Point, northern Baja California Sur.

== Habitat ==
Amphissa versicolor is found from the low intertidal zone to depths of about 46 metres (151 ft).
