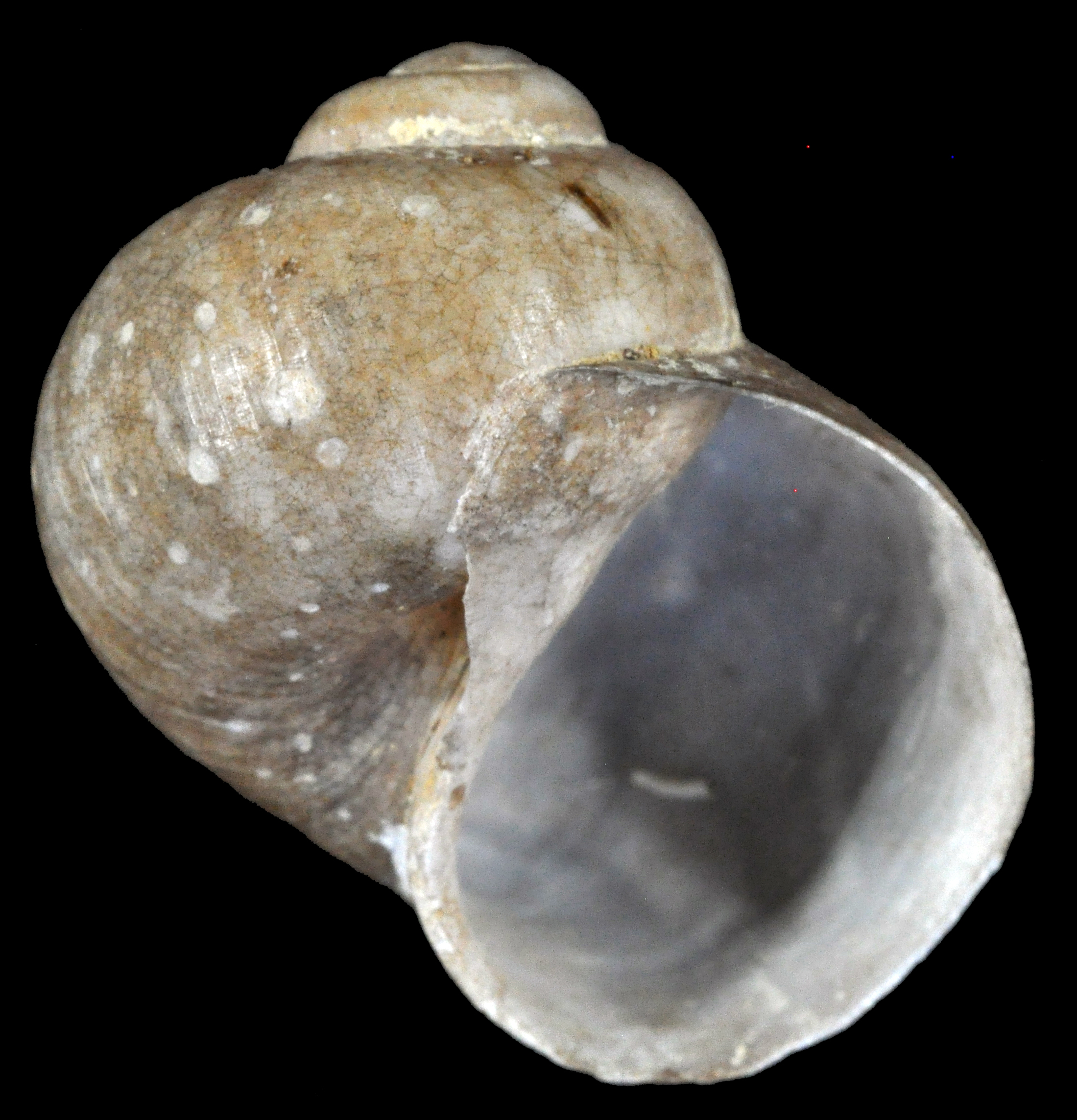
- Shell of Pseudonatica ampullarica (holotype at MNHN, Paris)

Scientific classification
- Kingdom: Animalia
- Phylum: Mollusca
- Class: Gastropoda
- Subclass: Caenogastropoda
- Order: Littorinimorpha
- Superfamily: Littorinoidea
- Family: Zerotulidae; Warén & Hain, 1996

= Zerotulidae =

Family of gastropods

The Zerotulidae comprise a taxonomic family of sea snails, marine gastropod molluscs in the superfamily Littorinoidea.

According to the taxonomy of the Gastropoda by Bouchet & Rocroi (2005) the family Zerotulidae has no subfamilies.

== Genera ==
Genera within the family Zerotulidae include:

- Dickdellia Warén & Hain, 1996
- Frovina Thiele, 1912
- Pseudonatica Simone, 2018
- Trilirata Warén & Hain, 1996
- Zerotula H. J. Finlay, 1926

Genera brought into synonymy:

- Frigidilacuna Tomlin, 1930: synonym of Frovina Thiele, 1912
- Prolacuna Thiele, 1913: synonym of Frovina Thiele, 1912
- Sublacuna Thiele, 1912: synonym of Frovina Thiele, 1912
