= Georg Johann Pfeffer =

German zoologist

- Born: 1854-03-07; Berlin
- Died: 1931-12-04; Hamburg

Georg Johann Pfeffer (1854–1931) was a German zoologist, primarily a malacologist, a scientist who studies mollusks.

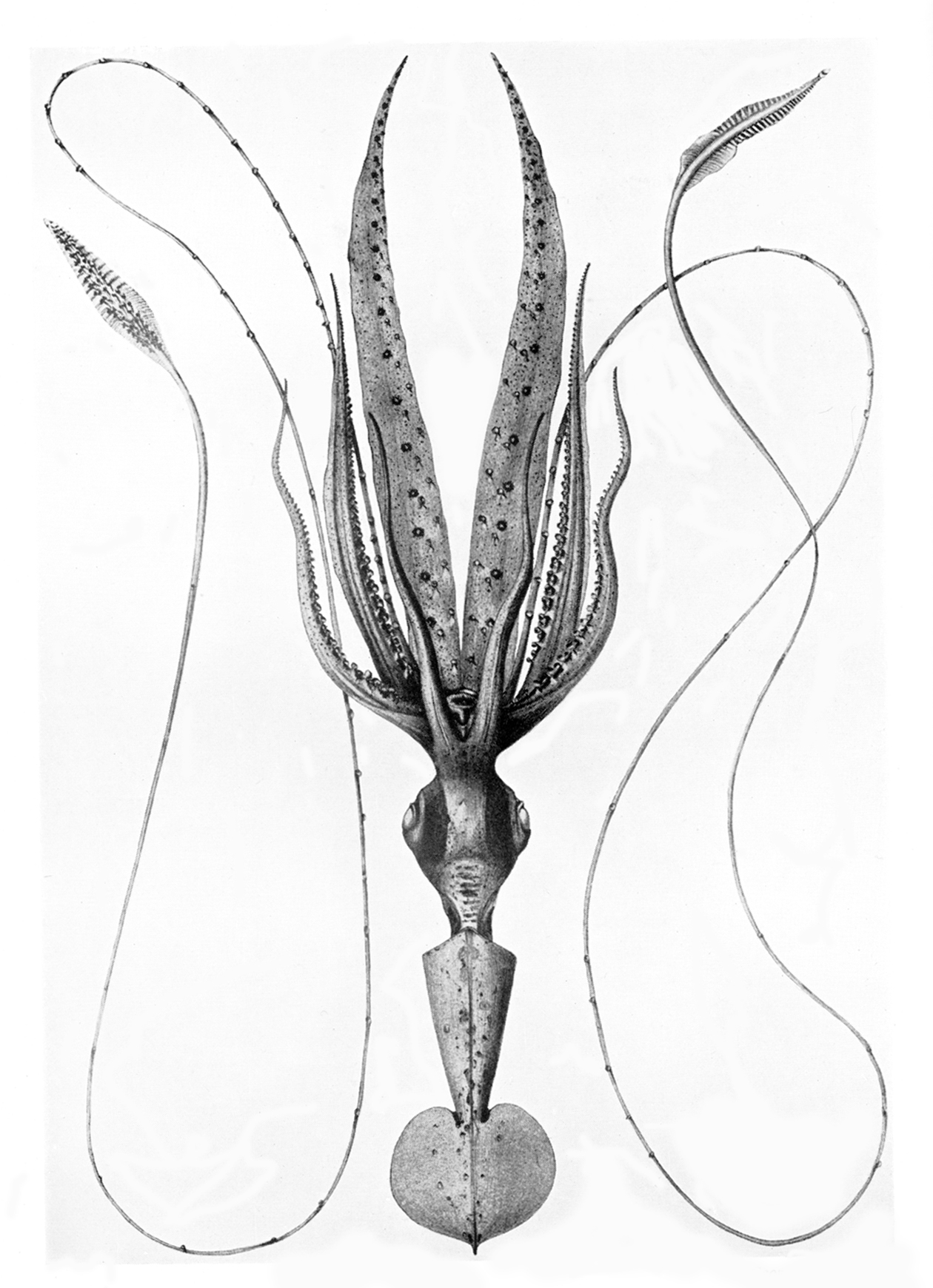
Illustration of the long-armed squid, Chiroteuthis veranyi (Férussac, 1835), from G.J. Pfeffer (1912).

Pfeffer was born in Berlin. In 1887 he became curator of the Hamburg Museum of Natural History, which was established in 1843 and destroyed during World War II. Pfeffer's published writings were mainly about cephalopods.

The World Register of Marine Species database lists 133 marine taxa named by Pfeffer

When Pfeffer's name is listed as an authority for a taxon such as the land snail genus Lamellaxis Strebel & Pfeffer, 1882, his name is not simply an orthographic error for the more commonly encountered molluscan authority Pfeiffer, i.e. Ludwig Karl Georg Pfeiffer, who lived 50 years earlier, from 1805 to 1877.

Georg Johann Pfeffer also studied amphibians and reptiles, naming several new species.

Two species of reptiles are named in his honor, Calamaria pfefferi and Trioceros pfefferi.

== Bibliography ==
- von Martens E, Pfeffer GJ (1886). "Die Mollusken von Süd-Georgien nach der Ausbeute der Deutschen Station 1882–83 ". Berichte über das Naturhistorische Museum zu Hamburg 1885: 65–135 + plates I-IV.
- Pfeffer GJ (1912). "Die Cephalopoden der Plankton-Expedition. Zugleich eine Monographische Übersicht der Oegopsiden Cephalopoden". In: Ergebnisse der Plankton-Expedition der Humboldt-Stiftung, Band 12 [Volume 12]. Kiel and Leipzig: Lipsius & Tischer.
- Pfeffer GJ (1930). "Zur Kentniss tertiärer Landschnecken ". Geologische und Paleontologische Abhandlungen (new series) 17 (3): 1–230 + plates 1–3.

== See also ==
- Category:Taxa named by Georg Johann Pfeffer
