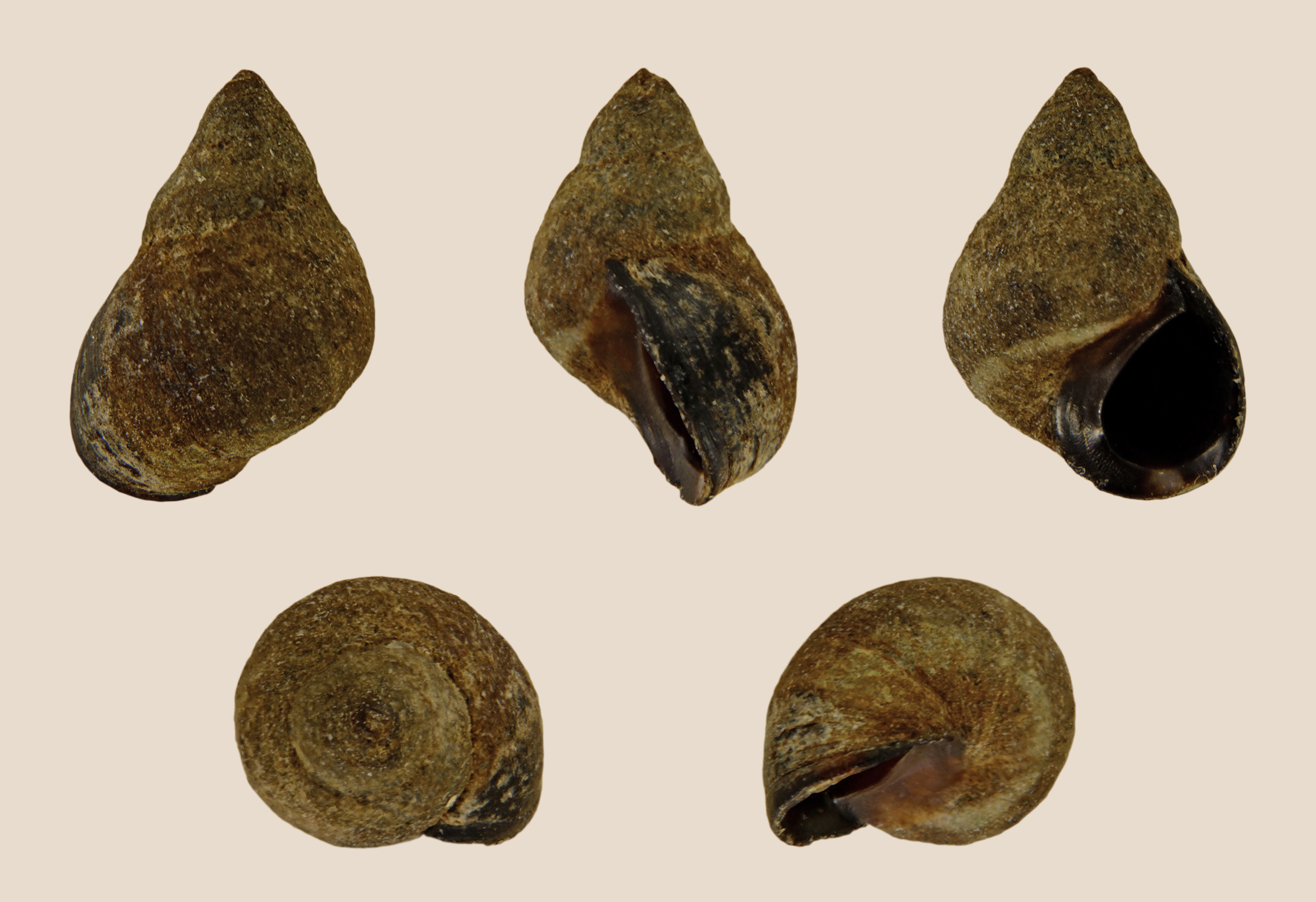
- Melarhaphe neritoides

Scientific classification
- Kingdom: Animalia
- Phylum: Mollusca
- Class: Gastropoda
- Subclass: Caenogastropoda
- Order: Littorinimorpha
- Family: Littorinidae
- Subfamily: Littorininae
- Genus: Melarhaphe; Menke, 1828

Synonyms
- Litorina (Melaraphe) Menke, 1828 superseded rank; Littorina (Melaraphe) Menke, 1828 (incorrect subsequent spelling); Littorina (Melarhaphe) Menke, 1828; Melaraphe Menke, 1828 (incorrect subsequent spelling)

= Melarhaphe =

Genus of gastropods

Melarhaphe is a genus of sea snails, marine gastropod mollusks in the family Littorinidae, the winkles or periwinkles.

== Species ==
Species within the genus Melarhaphe include:

- † Melarhaphe bernayi (Cossmann, 1888)
- † Melarhaphe deshayesi (Cossmann, 1888)
- † Melarhaphe ezanvillensis (Gougerot & Le Renard, 1978)
- † Melarhaphe gibbosa (Etheridge & Bell, 1893)
- † Melarhaphe levata (Deshayes, 1861)
- † Melarhaphe ligeriana (Kadolsky, 1973)
- † Melarhaphe mausseneti (Cossmann, 1907)
- Melarhaphe neritoides (Linnaeus, 1758)
- † Melarhaphe nodulifera (Kadolsky, 1973)
- † Melarhaphe obtusangula (F. Sandberger, 1859)
- † Melarhaphe perminima Pacaud, 2019
- † Melarhaphe pomeroli (Gougerot & Braillon, 1968)
- † Melarhaphe sacyi (Cossmann & Peyrot, 1919)
- † Melarhaphe silvae Landau, Marquet & Grigis, 2004
- † Melarhaphe suboperta (J. Sowerby, 1814)
- † Melarhaphe tumida (O. Boettger, 1869)
- † Melarhaphe vanhyftei Pacaud, 2019

Species brought into synonymy

- Melarhaphe blanfordi Dunker, 1871: synonym of Littoraria articulata (Philippi, 1846)
- Melarhaphe induta (Westerlund, 1898): synonym of Melarhaphe neritoides (Linnaeus, 1758)
- Melarhaphe oliveri Finlay, 1930: synonym of Austrolittorina antipodum (Philippi, 1847)
- Melarhaphe scabra (Linnaeus, 1758): synonym of Littoraria scabra (Linnaeus, 1758)
- Melarhaphe subgranosa Dunker in Dunker & Zelebor, 1866: synonym of Echinolittorina leucosticta (Philippi, 1847)
- Melarhaphe undulata (Gray, 1839): synonym of Littoraria undulata (Gray, 1839)
- Melarhaphe zelandiae Finlay, 1927: synonym of Austrolittorina cincta (Quoy & Gaimard, 1833)
