= L. lutea =

L. lutea may refer to:

- Lachenalia lutea, an African plant
- Lachesis lutea, a venomous pitviper
- Leiothrix lutea, a bird native to the Indian subcontinent
- Lepidagathis lutea, a dicotyledonous plant
- Lepiota lutea, a poisonous fungus
- Lithosia lutea, an Afro-Eurasian moth
- Litoria lutea, an Oceanian frog
- Littoraria lutea, a sea snail
- Lonchoptera lutea, a spear-winged fly
- Loxosceles lutea, a recluse spider
- Lumnitzera lutea, a flowering plant
- Luzula lutea, a perennial plant
