= L. pallescens =

L. pallescens may refer to:

- Lactarius pallescens, a mushroom species
- Littoraria pallescens, a sea snail species
- Luzula pallescens, a flowering plant species
