= L. irrorata =

L. irrorata can refer to a few different species. The specific epithet irrorata means 'moistened' or 'dewy.'

- Lactura irrorata, a moth in the family Lacturidae
- Landemania irrorata, a synonym for Pelodiscus sinensis, the Chinese softshell turtle
- Lecidea irrorata, a lichen in the family Lecideaceae
- Lecidella irrorata, a lichen in the family Lecanoraceae
- Lepidocephalichthys irrorata, a loach in the family Cobitidae
- Lepiota irrorata, a mushroom in the family Agaricaceae
- Leptoplana irrorata, a worm in the family Leptoplanidae
- Leucania irrorata, a moth in the family Noctuidae
- Leucopholis irrorata, a beetle in the family Scarabaeidae
- Libellula irrorata, a dragonfly in the family Libellulidae
- Libnotes irrorata, a cranefly in the family Limoniidae
- Lithosia irrorata, a synonym for Setina irrorella, the dew moth
- Littoraria irrorata, a snail in the family Littorinidae
- Littorina irrorata, synonym for Littoraria irrorata, a snail in the family Littorinidae
- Lobeza irrorata, a moth in the family Notodontidae
- Lyrella irrorata, a diatom algae in the family Lyrellaceae
