= Littoraria luteola =

Scientific classification
- Kingdom: Animalia
- Phylum: Mollusca
- Class: Gastropoda
- Subclass: Caenogastropoda
- Order: Littorinimorpha
- Family: Littorinidae
- Genus: Littoraria
- Species: L. luteola

Binomial name
- Littoraria luteola (Quoy & Gaimard, 1833)

Synonyms
- Littorina filosa subcingulata Nevill, 1885; Littorina luteola Quoy & Gaimard, 1833

Species of gastropod

Littoraria luteola is a species of sea snail, a marine gastropod mollusk in the family Littorinidae, the winkles or periwinkles.
