= Littoraria pintado =

Scientific classification
- Kingdom: Animalia
- Phylum: Mollusca
- Class: Gastropoda
- Subclass: Caenogastropoda
- Order: Littorinimorpha
- Family: Littorinidae
- Genus: Littoraria
- Species: L. pintado

Binomial name
- Littoraria pintado (Wood, 1828)

Synonyms
- Littorina pintado (Wood, 1828)

Species of gastropod

Littoraria pintado is a species of sea snail, a marine gastropod in the family Littorinidae, the winkles or periwinkles.

== Description ==
Pūpū kōlea are found on all rocky shorelines in Hawai'i. They live where waves will occasionally wet them but can live for long periods of time without the constant spray. Pūpū kōlea are a food source but not commonly eaten. It is found along the rocky shore all year long but I have noticed them in great numbers and spread across rock flats during the winter season when surf is high and the spray keeps the shoreline wet farther back than during the summer months. The winter season is also the season when kōlea or golden plover migrate to Hawai'i. Pūpū kōlea litter the rocky flats in such great numbers that they may have resembled kūkae or excrement. Their name may stem from the appearance of kōlea at the same time of year, documenting this natural occurrence.

== Body Description and Measurements ==
Littoraria pintado is a species of snails in the family periwinkle. Individuals can grow to 10 mm. They have sexual reproduction. Length, 9 mm; diameter, 5 mm. Shell: conic-turbinate; with microscopic spiral striae; purple-gray freckled with red-brown. Spire: five to nine moderately convex whorls; suture moderately impressed. Sculpture: microscopic spiral striae. Aperture: ovate; outer lip thin to moderately thick. Color: purple-gray, freckled with dark brown or black; aperture dark brown.

== Distribution ==
Pipipi were enjoyed as a food item. Children would snack on them as they collected them, prying the meat out and eating it at once. Kepelino (n.d. I: 66) says the snails were boiled or wrapped in leaves and broiled. "But a needle is required to dig out the flesh." Some people made a broth of the pipipi, adding the shells for flavor. Pregnant women were discouraged from eating pipipi lest their children be born with small eyes (makapipipi) (Pukui and Elbert 1957). Akolea, Littorina spp.; also called kolealea, ki:tkae-kolea, kolea, pipipi-kolea, pupukolea (Pukui and Elbert 1957; Figures lOF, G). Maui names for Epitonium spp.: pipipi- 'iikolea, kolea, or akolea (Pukui and Elbert 1957).

== Habitat ==
These littorines are abundant with Nodilittoring pieta in the supratidal region along all rocky shores from Midway to Hawaii. They are oviparous, shedding their eggs into the water where the young develop in the plankton. The veligers hatch from the egg capsules about four days after spawning and have a long planktonic life (Struhsaker, 1966). L. pintado spawns throughout the year, but only during high tides (Struhsaker, 1966). One female may produce 82,000 eggs per year. Fossils of L. pintado occur in Pleistocene deposits on Oahu (Ostergaard, 1928).
