= Littoraria sinensis =

Scientific classification
- Kingdom: Animalia
- Phylum: Mollusca
- Class: Gastropoda
- Subclass: Caenogastropoda
- Order: Littorinimorpha
- Family: Littorinidae
- Genus: Littoraria
- Species: L. sinensis

Binomial name
- Littoraria sinensis (Philippi, 1847)

Synonyms
- Litorina sinensis Philippi, 1847; Litorina strigata Lischke, 1871; Littorina adonis Yokoyama, 1927

Species of gastropod

Littoraria sinensis is a species of sea snail, a marine gastropod mollusk in the family Littorinidae, the winkles or periwinkles.
