= Littoraria strigata =

Scientific classification
- Kingdom: Animalia
- Phylum: Mollusca
- Class: Gastropoda
- Subclass: Caenogastropoda
- Order: Littorinimorpha
- Family: Littorinidae
- Genus: Littoraria
- Species: L. strigata

Binomial name
- Littoraria strigata (Philippi, 1846)

Synonyms
- Littorina intermedia var. strigata Philippi, 1846

Species of gastropod

Littoraria strigata is a species of sea snail, a marine gastropod mollusk in the family Littorinidae, the winkles or periwinkles.
