= Littoraria subvittata =

Scientific classification
- Kingdom: Animalia
- Phylum: Mollusca
- Class: Gastropoda
- Subclass: Caenogastropoda
- Order: Littorinimorpha
- Family: Littorinidae
- Genus: Littoraria
- Species: L. subvittata

Binomial name
- Littoraria subvittata Reid, 1986

Synonyms
- Littorina borbonica Barnard, 1951

Species of gastropod

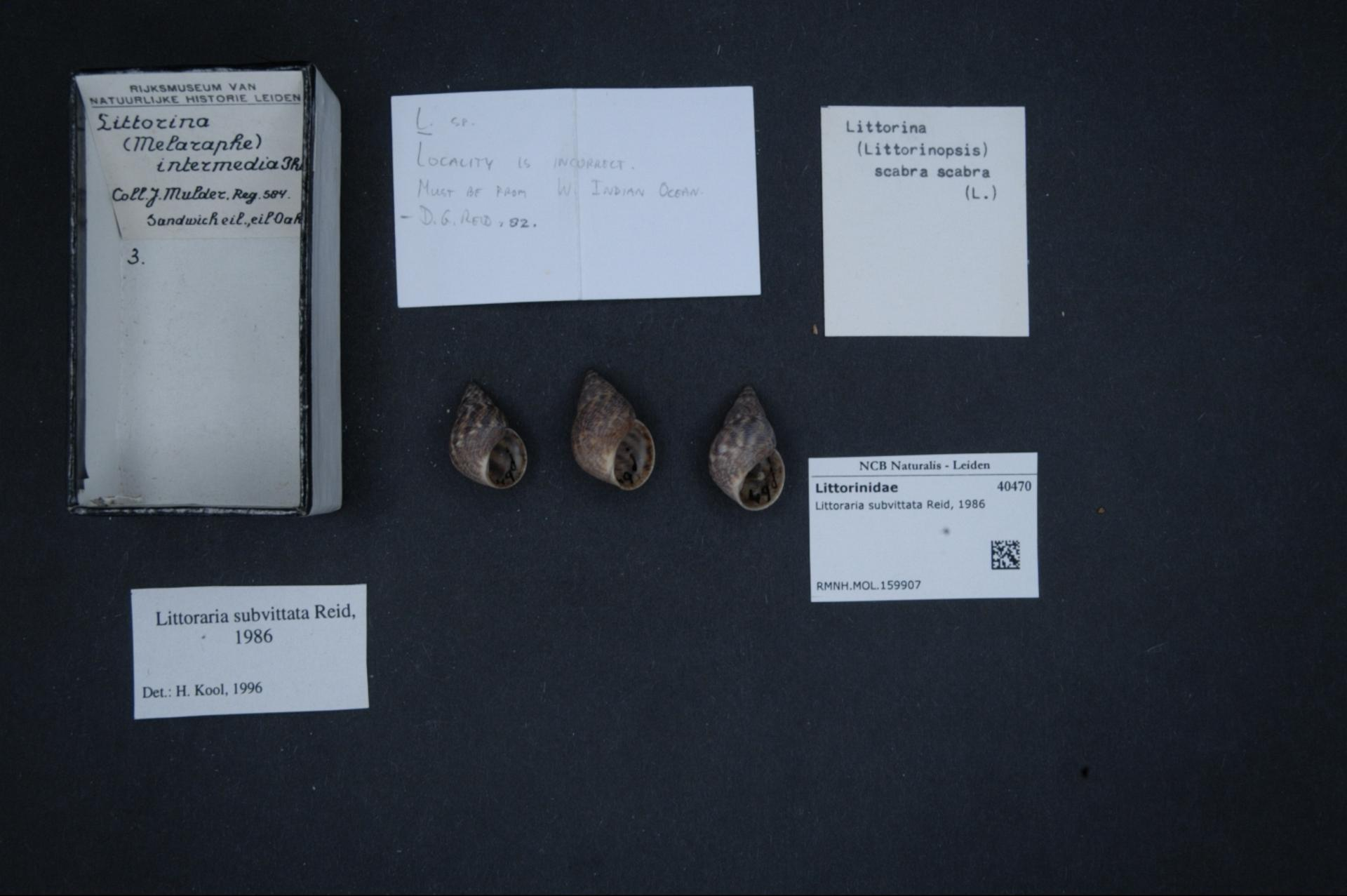
Three Littoraria subvittata Reid shells from 1986.

Littoraria subvittata is a species of sea snail, a marine gastropod mollusk in the family Littorinidae, the winkles or periwinkles.
