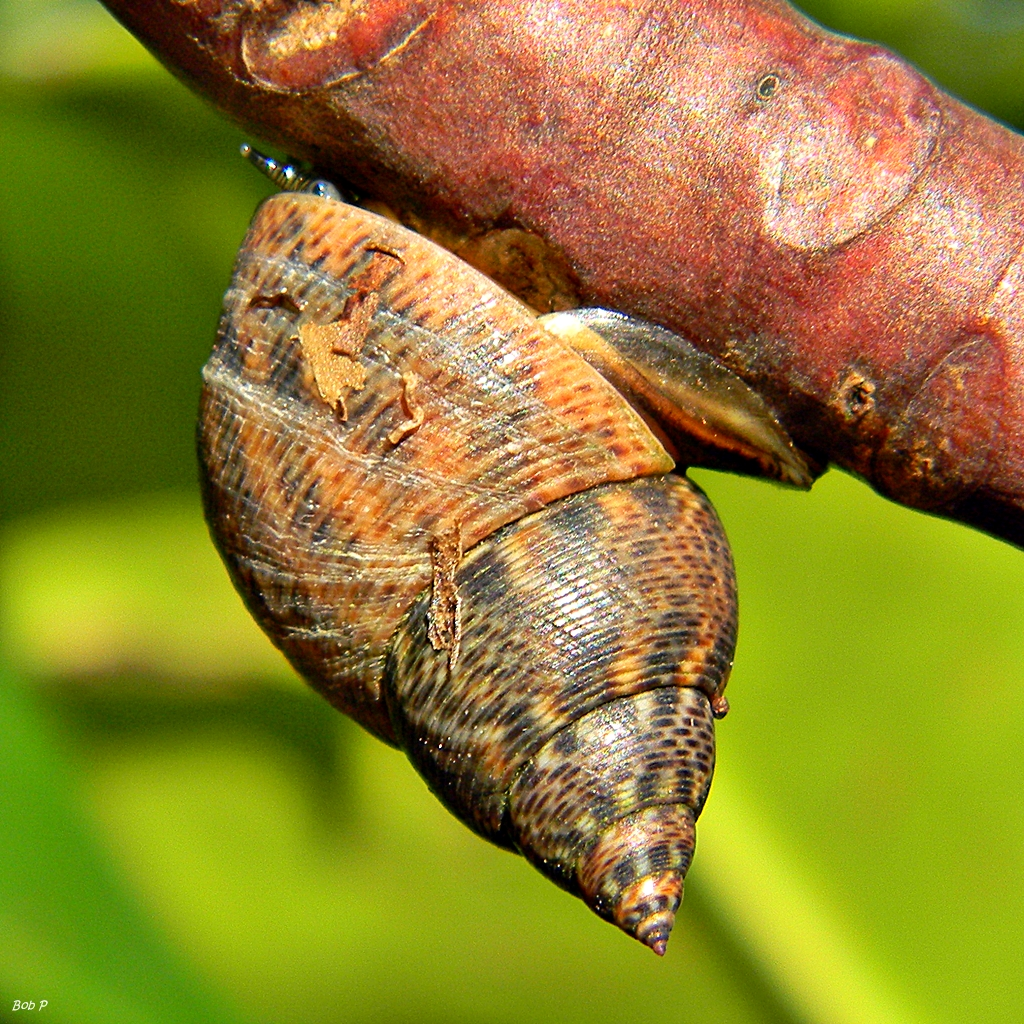
- A live Littorina angulifera

Scientific classification
- Kingdom: Animalia
- Phylum: Mollusca
- Class: Gastropoda
- Subclass: Caenogastropoda
- Order: Littorinimorpha
- Family: Littorinidae
- Genus: Littoraria
- Species: L. angulifera

Binomial name
- Littoraria angulifera (Lamarck, 1822)

Synonyms
- Littoraria (Littorinopsis) angulifera (Lamarck, 1822)· accepted, alternate representation; Littorina angulifera (Lamarck, 1822); Melaraphe angulifera Lamarck, 1822 (basionym); Phasianella angulifera Lamarck, 1822

= Littoraria angulifera =

Species of gastropod

Littoraria angulifera or the mangrove periwinkle is a species of sea snail, a marine gastropod mollusc in the family Littorinidae, the winkles.

== Description ==
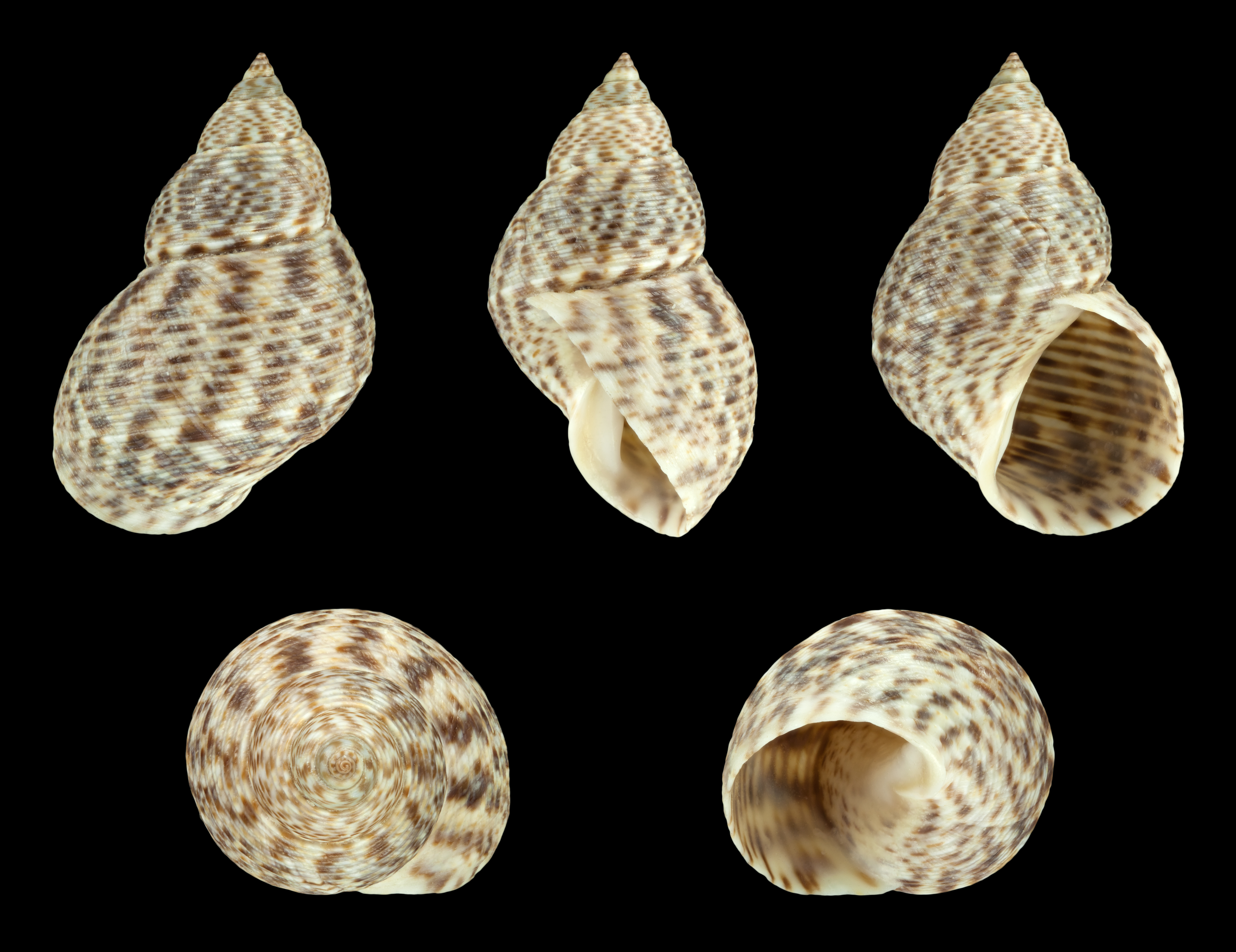
Shell

The maximum recorded shell length is 41 mm. The shell usually has six whorls, the large first one occupying half the length of the snail. The color varies from slaty-brown through reddish brown to orange, dull yellow and off white. The smaller whorls have white spots near their edges and also some darker streaks which fuse together on the largest whorl.

== Distribution and habitat ==
This species occurs in the Caribbean Sea and the western Atlantic Ocean from Florida south to Brazil. It is also found in the eastern Atlantic between Senegal and Angola. It lives mainly above sea level on the branches and prop roots of the red mangrove (Rhizophora mangle).

== Biology ==
Littoraria angulifera is a herbivore and browses on fungi and algae growing on the mangroves.

Littoraria angulifera is ovoviviparous. Fertilized eggs are brooded inside the periwinkle and the veliger larvae are then released and become planktonic. After about 9 weeks these develop into pediveliger larvae which undergo metamorphosis and settle.

== Human use ==
Littoraria angulifera is used as a zootherapeutical product for the treatment of chesty cough and shortness of breath in traditional Brazilian medicine in the Northeast of Brazil.
