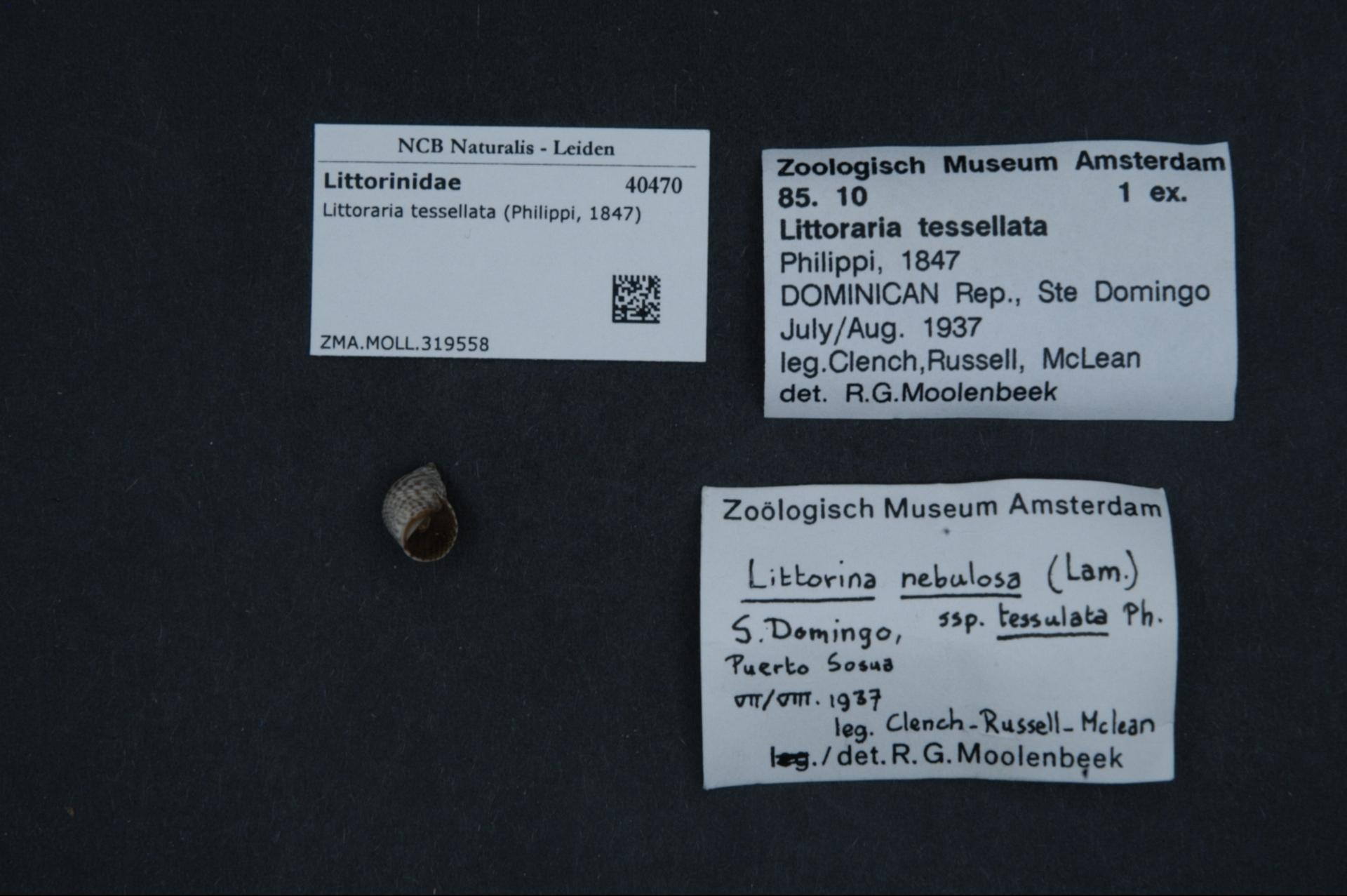
- Littoraria tessellata

Scientific classification
- Kingdom: Animalia
- Phylum: Mollusca
- Class: Gastropoda
- Subclass: Caenogastropoda
- Order: Littorinimorpha
- Family: Littorinidae
- Genus: Littoraria
- Species: L. tessellata

Binomial name
- Littoraria tessellata (Philippi, 1847)

= Littoraria tessellata =

Species of gastropod

Littoraria tessellata is a species of sea snail, a marine gastropod mollusk in the family Littorinidae, the winkles or periwinkles. The maximum recorded shell length is 23 mm.
