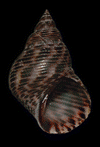
- Littoraria intermedia shell

Scientific classification
- Kingdom: Animalia
- Phylum: Mollusca
- Class: Gastropoda
- Subclass: Caenogastropoda
- Order: Littorinimorpha
- Family: Littorinidae
- Genus: Littoraria
- Species: L. intermedia

Binomial name
- Littoraria intermedia (Philippi, 1846)

Synonyms
- Litorina ambigua Philippi, 1848; Litorina scabra var. articulata Philippi, 1847; Littorina fraseri Reeve, 1857; Littorina intermedia Philippi, 1846; Littorina intermedia var. punctata Philippi, 1846; Littorina newcombi Reeve, 1857; Littorina scabra var. rhodea Biggs, 1958

= Littoraria intermedia =

Species of gastropod

Littoraria intermedia is a species of sea snail, a marine gastropod mollusk in the family Littorinidae, the winkles or periwinkles.

== Distribution ==
Mangrove forests of Vietnam, Eritrea, Indian Ocean (Aldabra, Chagos), Madagascar, Mozambique, Mauritius, Seychelles, Tanzania (Indo-Pacific)

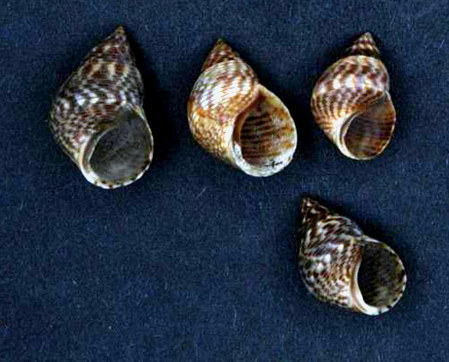
Four shells of Littoraria intermedia (museum specimens at Naturalis Biodiversity Center)

== Ecology ==
Littoraria intermedia is a predominantly mangrove-associated species.
