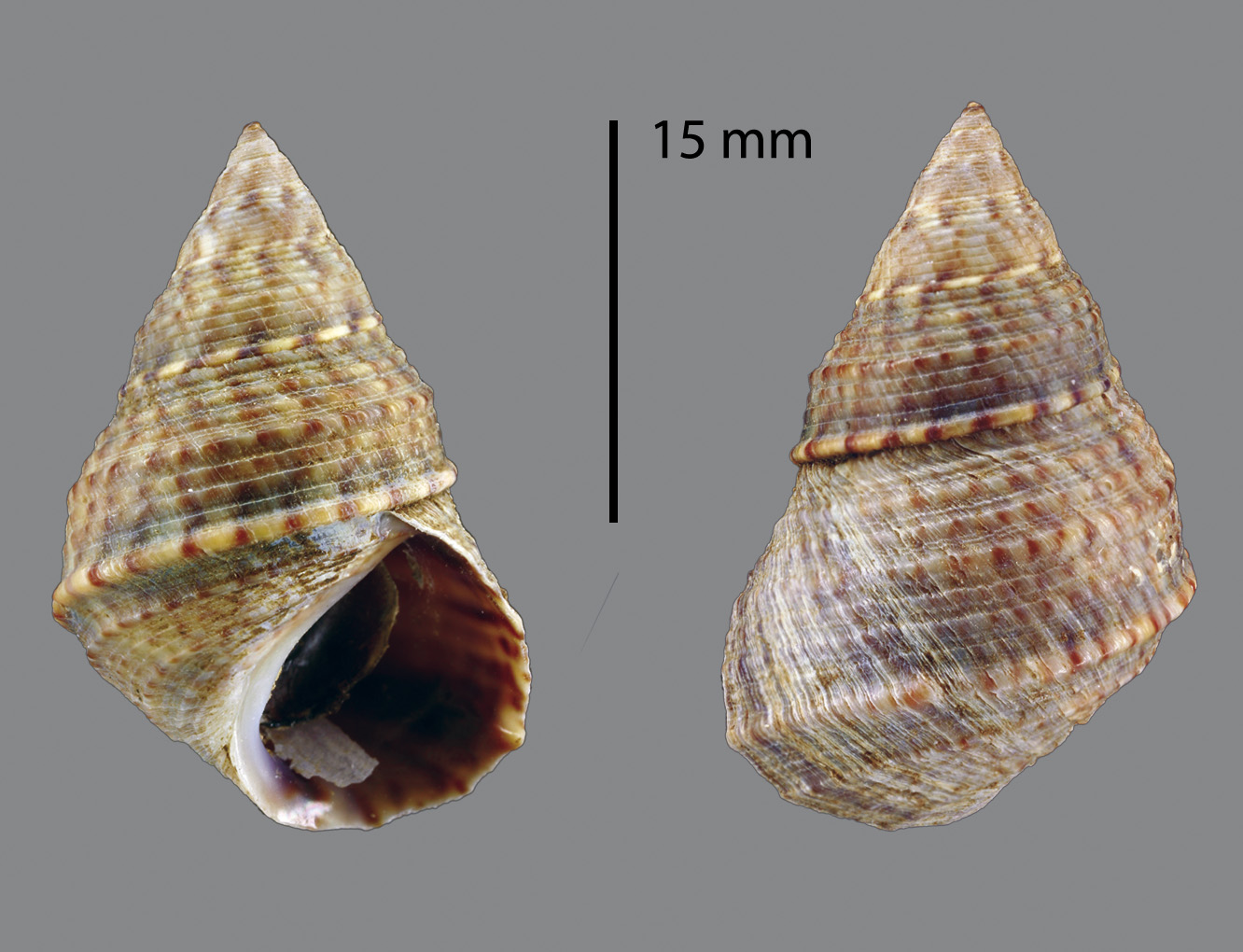
- Littoraria carinifera shells (specimen at MNHN, Paris)

Scientific classification
- Kingdom: Animalia
- Phylum: Mollusca
- Class: Gastropoda
- Subclass: Caenogastropoda
- Order: Littorinimorpha
- Family: Littorinidae
- Genus: Littoraria
- Species: L. carinifera

Binomial name
- Littoraria carinifera (Menke, 1830)

Synonyms
- Littorina carinifera (Menke, 1830); Littorina carinifera pyramidalis Nevill, 1885; Littorina carinifera var. laevior Nevill, 1885<; Littorina rubropicta Martens, 1887

= Littoraria carinifera =

Species of gastropod

Littoraria carinifera is a species of sea snail, a marine gastropod mollusk in the family Littorinidae, the winkles or periwinkles.

== Distribution ==
Vietnam.

== Description ==
This marine species occurs off the Philippines.

== Ecology ==
Littoraria carinifera is a predominantly mangrove-associated species.
