= Littoraria vespacea =

Scientific classification
- Kingdom: Animalia
- Phylum: Mollusca
- Class: Gastropoda
- Subclass: Caenogastropoda
- Order: Littorinimorpha
- Family: Littorinidae
- Genus: Littoraria
- Species: L. vespacea

Binomial name
- Littoraria vespacea Reid, 1986

Species of gastropod

Littoraria vespacea is a species of small sea snail, a marine gastropod mollusk in the family Littorinidae, the winkles or periwinkles.
