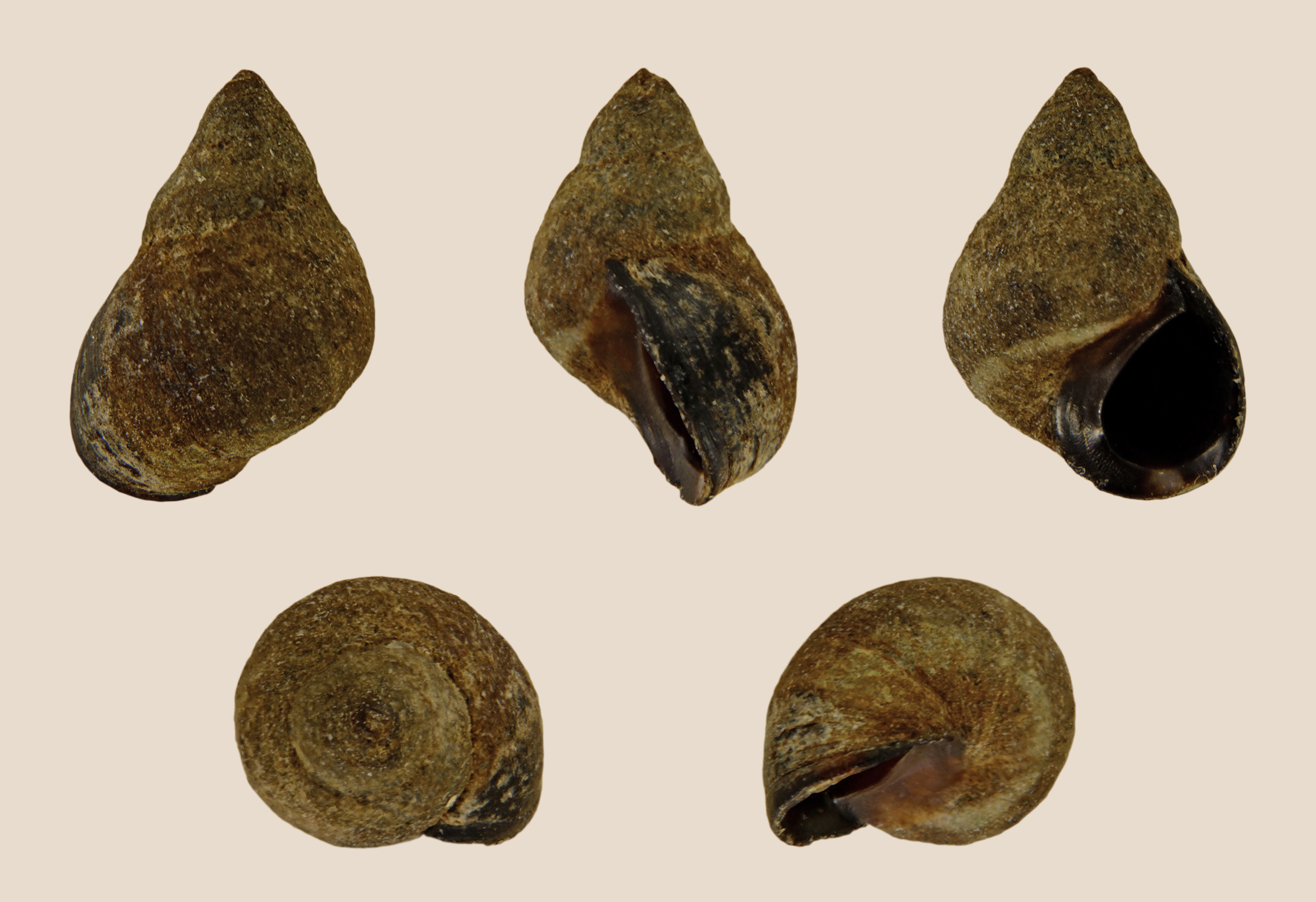

Scientific classification
- Kingdom: Animalia
- Phylum: Mollusca
- Class: Gastropoda
- Subclass: Caenogastropoda
- Order: Littorinimorpha
- Family: Littorinidae
- Genus: Melarhaphe; Menke, 1828
- Species: M. neritoides

Binomial name
- Melarhaphe neritoides (Linnaeus, 1758)

Synonyms
- Helix petraea Montagu, 1803; Littorina neritoides (Linnaeus, 1758); Littorina petraeus (Montagu, 1803); Melarhaphe induta (Westerlund, 1898); Paludinella littorina (delle Chiaje, 1828); Tricolia rissoi Audouin, 1826; Turbo neritoides Linnaeus, 1758

= Melarhaphe neritoides =

Species of gastropod

Melarhaphe neritoides, common name : the small periwinkle, is a species of small sea snail, a marine gastropod mollusc in the family Littorinidae, the winkles or periwinkles.

This species was previously known as Littorina neritoides.

Melarhaphe is a monotypic genus, in other words, this is the only species in that genus.

== Description and habitat ==
This is a tiny species with the size of an adult shell varying between 4 mm and 9 mm. It has a high pointed spire. The dark aperture is oval. The purple-brown spiral band can be clearly seen on the body whorl.

The small periwinkle breeds in late winter. Its pelagic egg capsules release planktonic larvae.

This small gastropod lives in the upper levels of natural or artificial rocky shores, up to the limit of the highest tides, where it can be abundant and is often the only marine gastropod. It feeds on detritus and on black lichen of the genus Lichina.

== Distribution ==
This species is found in European waters from Norway down south, in the Atlantic Ocean along the Azores, Canary Islands, Cape Verde, Morocco, Mauritania; in the Mediterranean Sea and the Black Sea.
