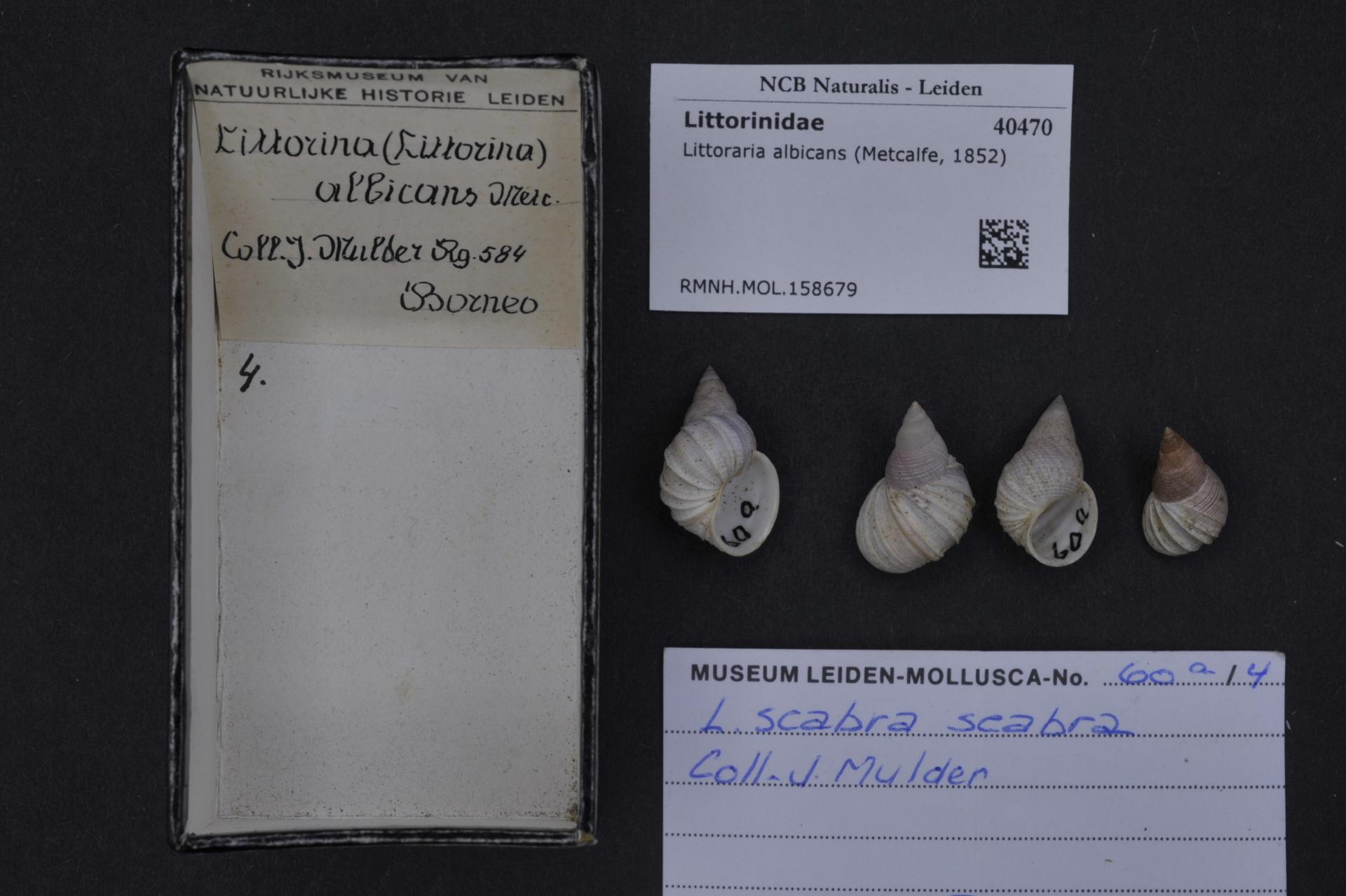
- Littoraria albicans shells

Scientific classification
- Kingdom: Animalia
- Phylum: Mollusca
- Class: Gastropoda
- Subclass: Caenogastropoda
- Order: Littorinimorpha
- Family: Littorinidae
- Genus: Littoraria
- Species: L. albicans

Binomial name
- Littoraria albicans (Metcalfe, 1852)

Synonyms
- Littorina albicans Metcalf, 1852

= Littoraria albicans =

Species of gastropod

Littoraria albicans is a species of sea snail, a marine gastropod mollusk in the family Littorinidae, the winkles or periwinkles.
