= Littoraria coccinea =

- Littoraria coccinea glabrata shell

Scientific classification
- Kingdom: Animalia
- Phylum: Mollusca
- Class: Gastropoda
- Subclass: Caenogastropoda
- Order: Littorinimorpha
- Family: Littorinidae
- Genus: Littoraria
- Species: L. coccinea

Binomial name
- Littoraria coccinea (Gmelin, 1791)

Synonyms
- Littorina obesa (Sowerby I, 1832)

Species of gastropod

Littoraria coccinea is a species of sea snail, a marine gastropod mollusk in the family Littorinidae, the winkles or periwinkles.
