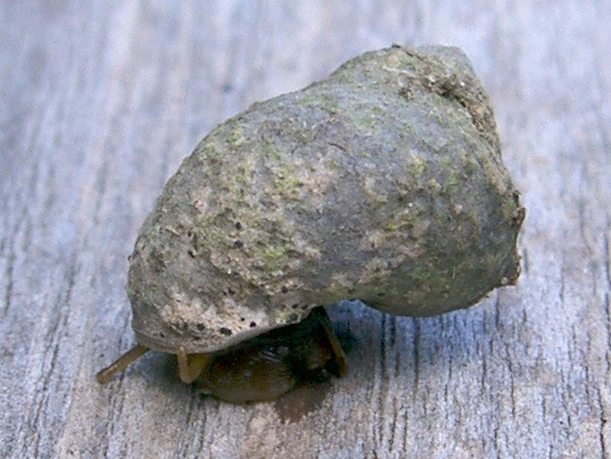
- The shell of this individual of Littoraria irrorata is covered with the lichen Pyrenocollema halodytes

Scientific classification
- Kingdom: Animalia
- Phylum: Mollusca
- Class: Gastropoda
- Subclass: Caenogastropoda
- Order: Littorinimorpha
- Superfamily: Littorinoidea
- Family: Littorinidae
- Subfamily: Littorininae
- Genus: Littoraria; Griffith & Pidgeon, 1834

Type species
- Littorina pulchra Sowerby I, 1832

Synonyms
- Littoraria (Bulimilittorina) D. Reid, 1989· accepted, alternate representation; Littoraria (Lamellilitorina) Tryon, 1887· accepted, alternate representation; Littoraria (Lamellitorina) [sic] (misspelling); Littoraria (Littoraria) Gray, 1833· accepted, alternate representation; Littoraria (Littorinopsis) Mörch, 1876· accepted, alternate representation; Littoraria (Palustorina) D. Reid, 1986· accepted, alternate representation; Littoraria (Protolittoraria) D. Reid, 1989· accepted, alternate representation; Littorina (Littoraria) Gray, 1833; Littorina (Littorinopsis) Mörch, 1876 (basionym); Littorinopsis Mörch, 1876; † Littorinopsis (Touzinia) Cossmann, 1916 (original rank)

= Littoraria =

Genus of gastropods

Littoraria is a genus of sea snails, marine gastropod mollusks in the family Littorinidae, the winkles or periwinkles.

There are more than fifty species in this genus of which more than 20 species are believed to be synonyms of Littoraria scabra, a very variable species.

Many of the species in this genus occur in the Indo-West Pacific region and in the Tropical Eastern Pacific, where they are found in large numbers on the trunks, trees and prop roots of tropical mangrove forests a few metres above high tide level. These snails feed on the thin film of algae, epiphytes, fungi, diatoms and leaf epidermis of these mangroves. The species living on higher levels of the trees have thinner shells, and are more variable in shell colour.

Within this genus, Littoraria aberrans is the only ovoviviparous species with an intracapsular metamorphosis.

== Species ==
Species in the genus Littoraria include:

- Littoraria aberrans Philippi, 1846
- Littoraria ahenea Reid, 1986
- Littoraria albicans Metcalfe, 1852
- Littoraria angulifera Lamarck, 1822 - mangrove periwinkle
  - Littoraria angulifera hessei Boettger 1912
- Littoraria ardouiniana (Heude, 1885)
- Littoraria articulata Philippi, 1846
- Littoraria bengalensis Reid, 2001
- Littoraria carinifera Menke, 1830
- Littoraria cingulata Philippi, 1846
- Littoraria cingulifera Dunker, 1845
- Littoraria coccinea (Gmelin, 1791)
- Littoraria conica Philippi, 1846
- Littoraria delicatula Nevill, 1885
- Littoraria filosa (G.B. Sowerby I, 1832)
- Littoraria fasciata Sowerby I, 1832
- † Littoraria flammea Philippi, 1847
- Littoraria flava King & Broderip, 1832
- Littoraria flavaosa King & Broderip, 1832
- Littoraria ianthostoma Stuckey & D.G. Reid, 2002
- Littoraria intermedia Philippi, 1846
- Littoraria irrorata Say, 1822 - marsh periwinkle
- Littoraria lutea Philippi, 1847
- Littoraria luteola Quoy & Gaimard, 1833
- † Littoraria massicardi Pacaud, 2019
- Littoraria mauritiana Lamarck, 1822
- Littoraria melanostoma Gray, 1839
- Littoraria miodelicatula Oyama, 1950
- Littoraria nebulosa Lamarck, 1822 - cloudy periwinkle
- Littoraria obesa Gmelin, 1791
- Littoraria pallescens Philippi, 1846
- Littoraria philippiana Reeve, 1857
- Littoraria pintado Wood, 1820
  - Littoraria pintado pullata Carpenter, 1864
- Littoraria planaxis Philippi, 1846
- † Littoraria prevostina (Basterot, 1825)
- Littoraria punctata Philippi, 184
- Littoraria rosewateri Reid, 1999
- Littoraria scabra (Linnaeus, 1758)
- Littoraria sinensis Philippi, 1847
- Littoraria strigata Philippi, 1846
- † Littoraria subangulata (Deshayes, 1861)
- Littoraria subvittata Reid, 1986
- Littoraria sulculosa Philippi, 1846
- Littoraria tessellata Philippi, 1847
- Littoraria undulata Gray, 1839
- Littoraria varia Sowerby I, 1832
- Littoraria variegata Souleyet, in Eydoux & Souleyet, 1852
- Littoraria vespacea Reid, 1986
- Littoraria zebra Donovan, 1825 - zebra periwinkle

Species brought into synonymy

- Littoraria dantaae Y.-F. Fang, Y.-J. Peng, G.-J. Zhang & J. He, 2012: synonym of Mainwaringia dantaae Y.-F. Fang, Y.-J. Peng, G.-J. Zhang & J. He, 2012
- Littoraria glabrata Philippi, 1846 : synonym of Littoraria coccinea glabrata (Philippi, 1846)
- Littoraria kraussi (Rosewater, 1970): synonym of Littoraria coccinea glabrata (Philippi, 1846)
- Littoraria pulchra Gray, 1833: synonym of Littoraria zebra (Donovan, 1825) (junior synonym)
