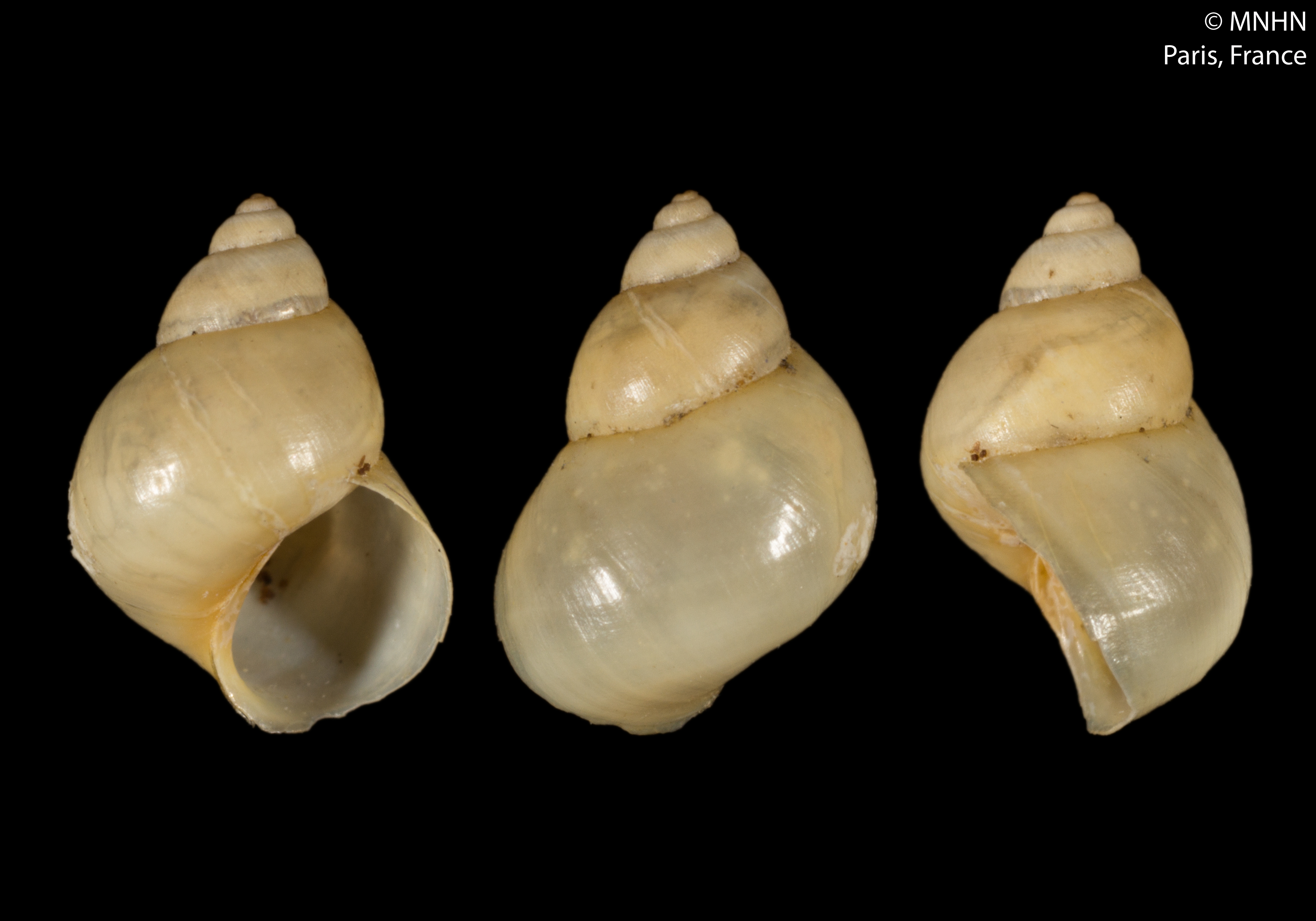
- Shell of Littoraria mauritiana (syntype at MNHN, Paris)

Scientific classification
- Kingdom: Animalia
- Phylum: Mollusca
- Class: Gastropoda
- Subclass: Caenogastropoda
- Order: Littorinimorpha
- Family: Littorinidae
- Subfamily: Littorininae
- Genus: Littoraria
- Species: L. mauritiana

Binomial name
- Littoraria mauritiana (Lamarck, 1822)

Synonyms
- Littorina mauritiana (Lamark, 1882); Littorina (Littoraria) mauritiana (Lamarck, 1822); Littorina mauritiana (Lamarck, 1822); Phasianella mauritiana Lamarck, 1822 (original combination); Phasianella vitrea Deshayes, 1863

= Littoraria mauritiana =

Species of gastropod

Littoraria mauritiana is a species of sea snail, a marine gastropod mollusk in the family Littorinidae, the winkles or periwinkles.

== Description ==
The length of the shell attains 7 mm.

== Distribution ==
This species occurs off Réunion and Mauritius.
