= Littoraria ardouiniana =

Scientific classification
- Kingdom: Animalia
- Phylum: Mollusca
- Class: Gastropoda
- Subclass: Caenogastropoda
- Order: Littorinimorpha
- Family: Littorinidae
- Genus: Littoraria
- Species: L. ardouiniana

Binomial name
- Littoraria ardouiniana (Heude, 1885)

Species of gastropod

Littoraria ardouiniana is a species of sea snail, a marine gastropod mollusk in the family Littorinidae, the winkles or periwinkles.

== Distribution ==
Vietnam.

== Ecology ==
Littoraria ardouiniana is a predominantly mangrove-associated species.
