= Littoraria aberrans =

Scientific classification
- Kingdom: Animalia
- Phylum: Mollusca
- Class: Gastropoda
- Subclass: Caenogastropoda
- Order: Littorinimorpha
- Family: Littorinidae
- Genus: Littoraria
- Species: L. aberrans

Binomial name
- Littoraria aberrans (Philippi, 1846)

Species of gastropod

Littoraria aberrans is a species of sea snail, a marine gastropod mollusc in the family Littorinidae, the winkles or periwinkles.
