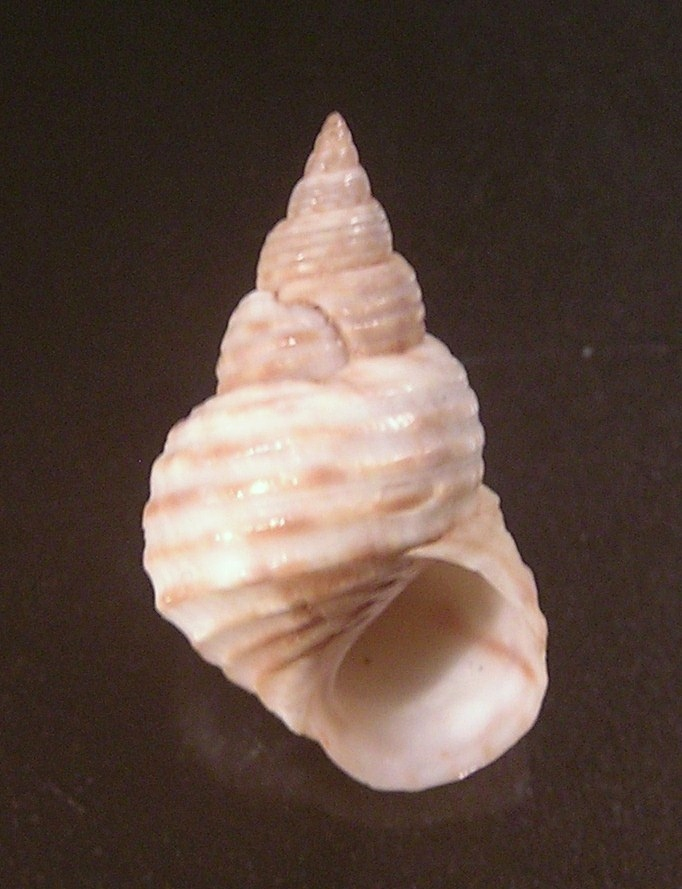

Scientific classification
- Kingdom: Animalia
- Phylum: Mollusca
- Class: Gastropoda
- Subclass: Caenogastropoda
- Order: Littorinimorpha
- Family: Littorinidae
- Genus: Littoraria
- Species: L. cingulata

Binomial name
- Littoraria cingulata (Philippi, 1846)

= Littoraria cingulata =

Species of gastropod

Littoraria cingulata is a species of sea snail, a marine gastropod mollusk in the family Littorinidae, the winkles or periwinkles.

== Distribution ==
Littoraria cingulata is found in the tropical waters on the Indian Ocean.
