= Littoraria ianthostoma =

Scientific classification
- Kingdom: Animalia
- Phylum: Mollusca
- Class: Gastropoda
- Subclass: Caenogastropoda
- Order: Littorinimorpha
- Family: Littorinidae
- Genus: Littoraria
- Species: L. ianthostoma

Binomial name
- Littoraria ianthostoma Stuckey & Reid, 2002

Species of gastropod

Littoraria ianthostoma is a species of sea snail, a marine gastropod mollusk in the family Littorinidae, the winkles or periwinkles.
