= Littoraria philippiana =

Scientific classification
- Kingdom: Animalia
- Phylum: Mollusca
- Class: Gastropoda
- Subclass: Caenogastropoda
- Order: Littorinimorpha
- Family: Littorinidae
- Genus: Littoraria
- Species: L. philippiana

Binomial name
- Littoraria philippiana (Reeve, 1857)

Synonyms
- Litorina philippiana Martens, 1900; Littorina philippiana Reeve, 1857

Species of gastropod

Littoraria philippiana is a species of sea snail, a marine gastropod mollusk in the family Littorinidae, the winkles or periwinkles.
