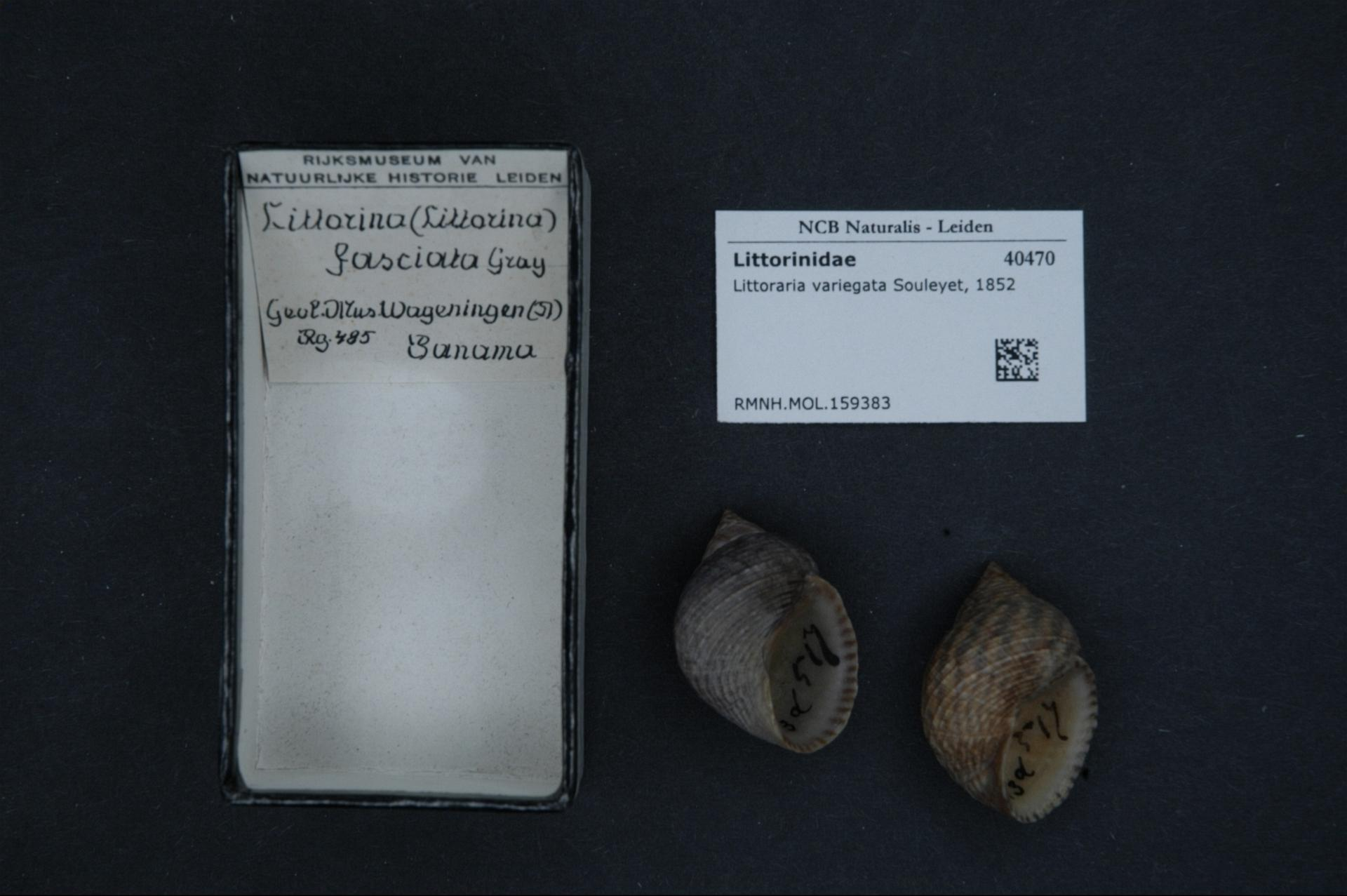

Scientific classification
- Kingdom: Animalia
- Phylum: Mollusca
- Class: Gastropoda
- Subclass: Caenogastropoda
- Order: Littorinimorpha
- Family: Littorinidae
- Genus: Littoraria
- Species: L. variegata

Binomial name
- Littoraria variegata Souleyet, 1852

= Littoraria variegata =

Species of gastropod

Littoraria variegata is a species of sea snail, a marine gastropod mollusk in the family Littorinidae, the winkles or periwinkles.
