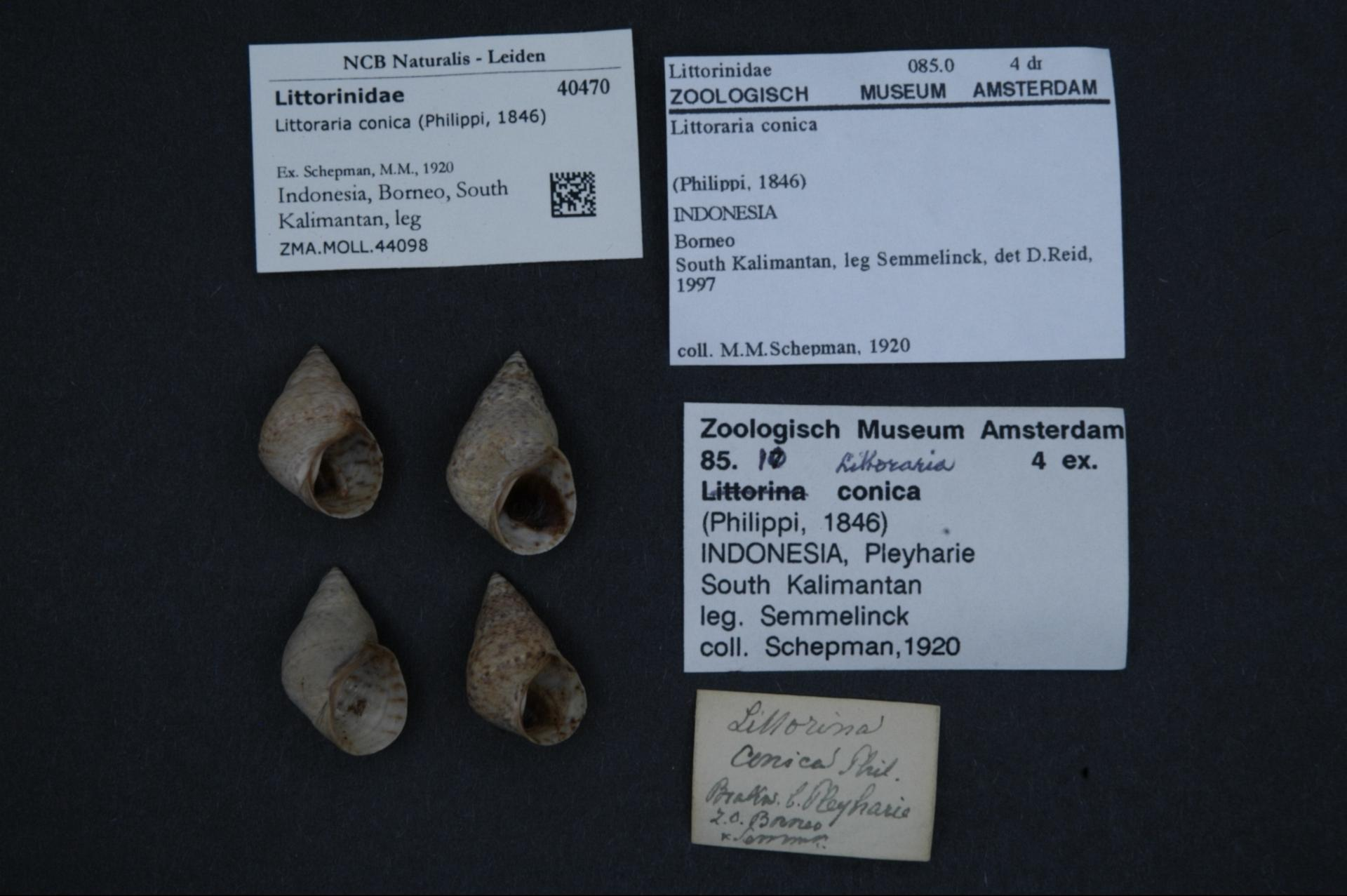
- Littoraria conica shells

Scientific classification
- Kingdom: Animalia
- Phylum: Mollusca
- Class: Gastropoda
- Subclass: Caenogastropoda
- Order: Littorinimorpha
- Family: Littorinidae
- Genus: Littoraria
- Species: L. conica

Binomial name
- Littoraria conica (Philippi, 1846)

Synonyms
- Littorina conica Philippi, 1846

= Littoraria conica =

Species of gastropod

Littoraria conica is a species of sea snail, a marine gastropod mollusk in the family Littorinidae, the winkles or periwinkles.
