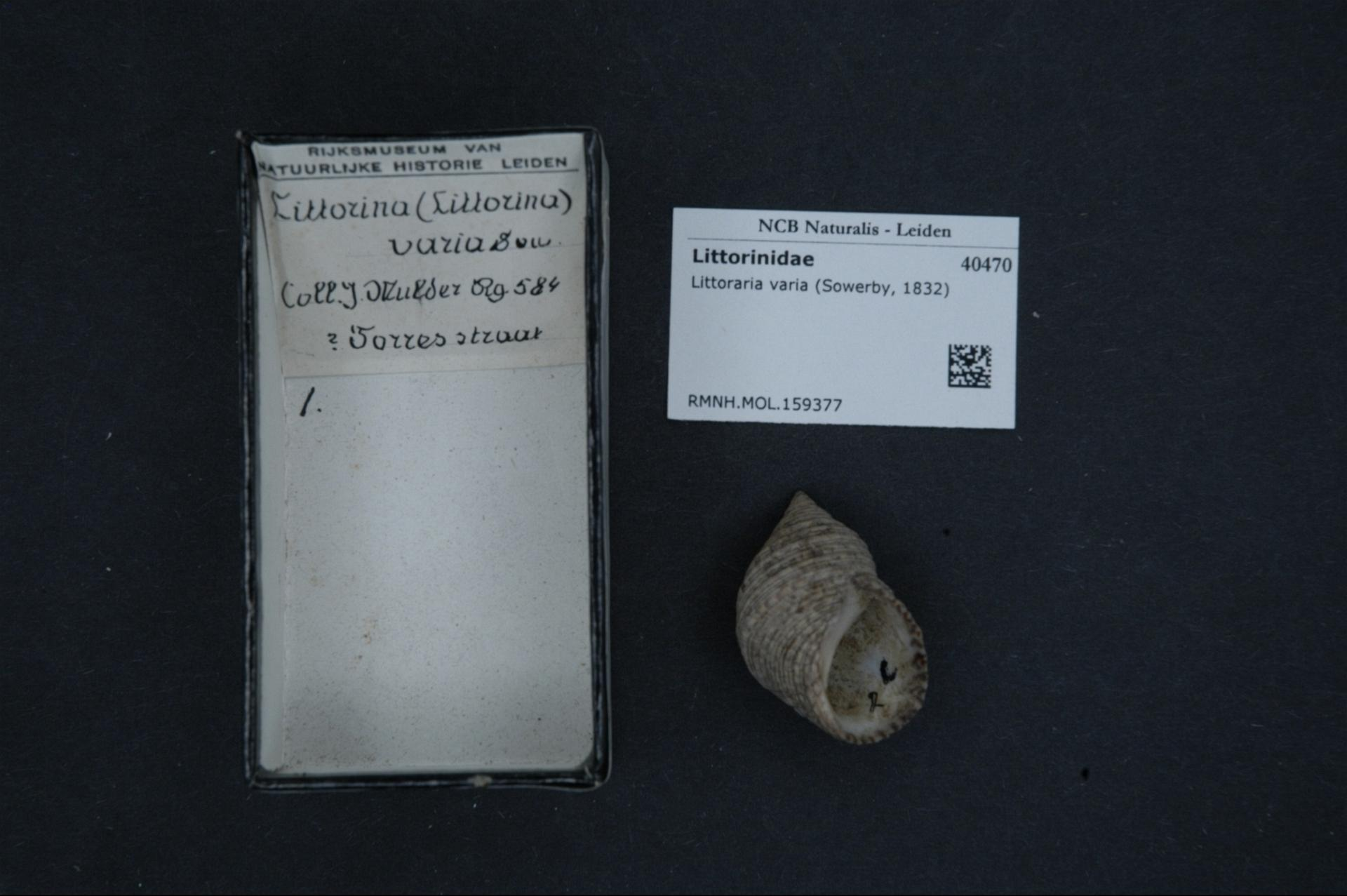
- Littoraria varia shell

Scientific classification
- Kingdom: Animalia
- Phylum: Mollusca
- Class: Gastropoda
- Subclass: Caenogastropoda
- Order: Littorinimorpha
- Family: Littorinidae
- Genus: Littoraria
- Species: L. varia

Binomial name
- Littoraria varia (Sowerby I, 1832)

= Littoraria varia =

Species of gastropod

Littoraria varia is a species of sea snail, a marine gastropod mollusk in the family Littorinidae, the winkles or periwinkles.

== Distribution ==
Panama to Peru
