= Littoraria delicatula =

Scientific classification
- Kingdom: Animalia
- Phylum: Mollusca
- Class: Gastropoda
- Subclass: Caenogastropoda
- Order: Littorinimorpha
- Family: Littorinidae
- Genus: Littoraria
- Species: L. delicatula

Binomial name
- Littoraria delicatula (Nevill, 1885)

Synonyms
- Littorina conica var. delicatula Nevill, 1885; Littorina conica var. subintermedia Nevill, 1885

Species of gastropod

Littoraria delicatula is a species of sea snail, a marine gastropod mollusk in the family Littorinidae, the winkles or periwinkles.
