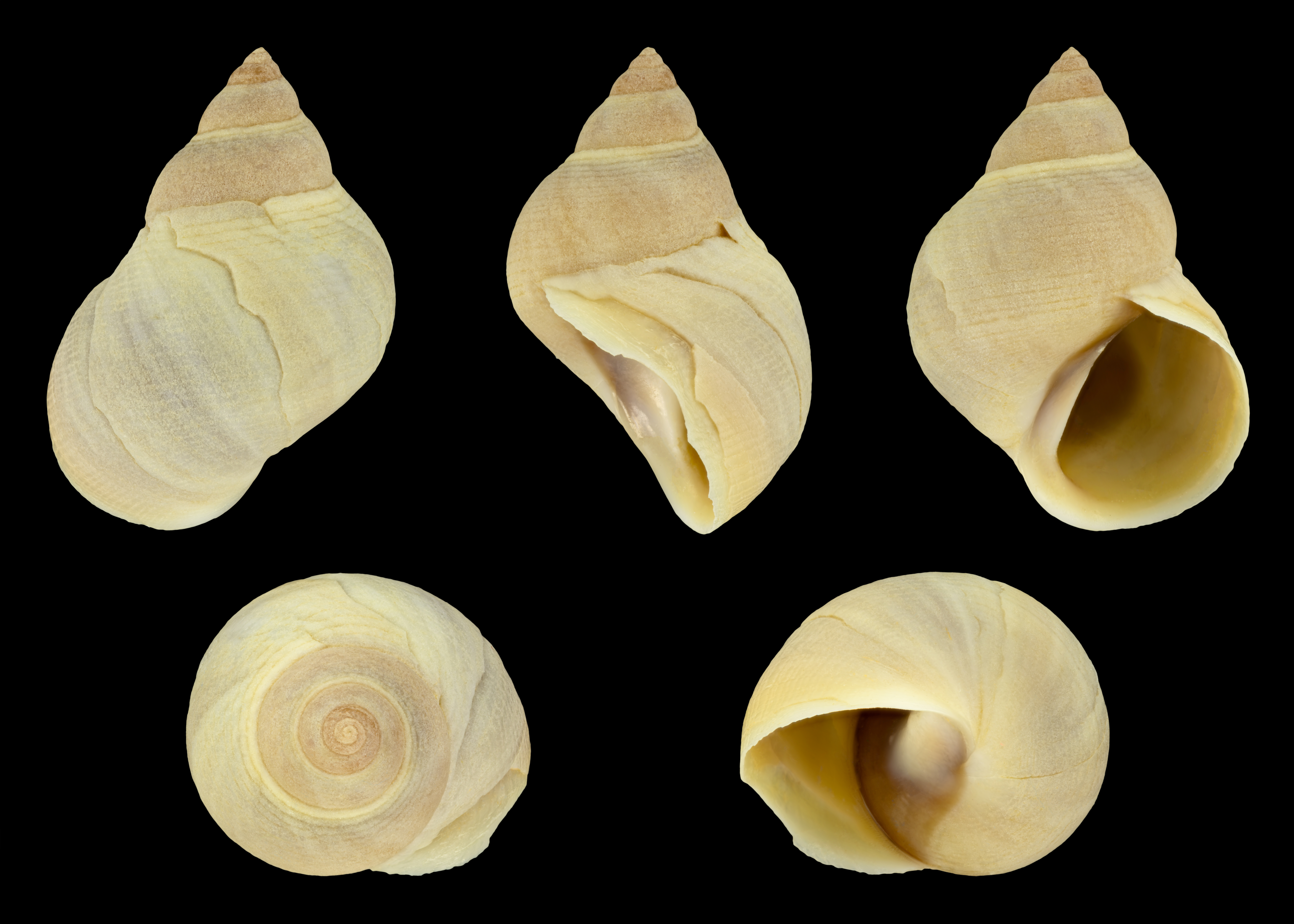

Scientific classification
- Kingdom: Animalia
- Phylum: Mollusca
- Class: Gastropoda
- Subclass: Caenogastropoda
- Order: Littorinimorpha
- Family: Littorinidae
- Genus: Littoraria
- Species: L. nebulosa

Binomial name
- Littoraria nebulosa (Lamarck, 1822)

= Littoraria nebulosa =

Species of gastropod

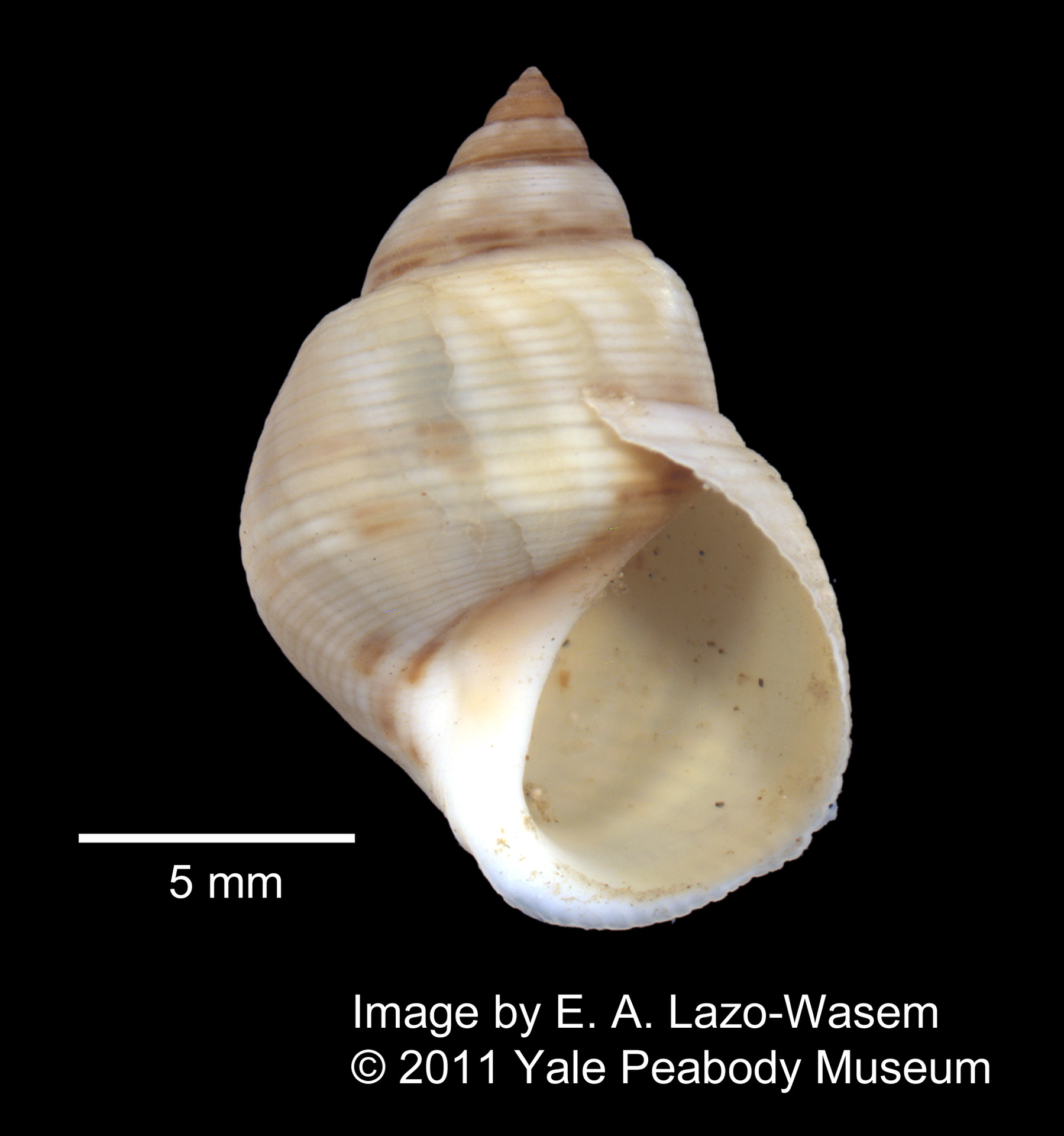
Littorina nebulosa

Littoraria nebulosa is a species of sea snail, a marine gastropod mollusk in the family Littorinidae, the winkles or periwinkles.

== Description ==
The maximum recorded shell length is 28 mm.

== Habitat ==
Minimum recorded depth is -1 m. Maximum recorded depth is 0 m.
