= Littoraria rosewateri =

Scientific classification
- Kingdom: Animalia
- Phylum: Mollusca
- Class: Gastropoda
- Subclass: Caenogastropoda
- Order: Littorinimorpha
- Family: Littorinidae
- Genus: Littoraria
- Species: L. rosewateri

Binomial name
- Littoraria rosewateri Reid, 1999

Species of gastropod

Littoraria rosewateri is a species of sea snail, a marine gastropod mollusk in the family Littorinidae, the winkles or periwinkles.
