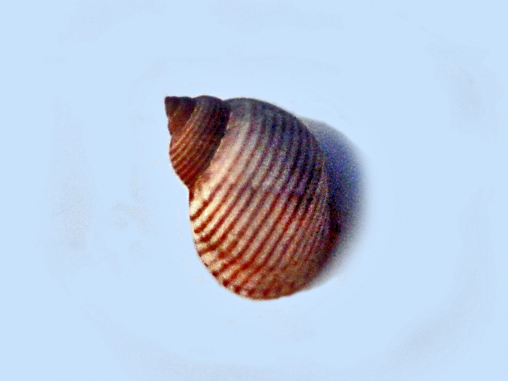
- Littoraria cingulifera from western African coast, on display at the Museo Civico di Storia Naturale di Milano

Scientific classification
- Kingdom: Animalia
- Phylum: Mollusca
- Class: Gastropoda
- Subclass: Caenogastropoda
- Order: Littorinimorpha
- Family: Littorinidae
- Genus: Littoraria
- Species: L. cingulifera

Binomial name
- Littoraria cingulifera (Dunker, 1845)

Synonyms
- Littorina cingulifera Dunker, 1845

= Littoraria cingulifera =

Species of gastropod

Littoraria cingulifera is a species of sea snail, a marine gastropod mollusk in the family Littorinidae, the winkles or periwinkles.

== Distribution ==
This species is present in the North Atlantic Ocean, West African Coast.

== Description ==
Shells of this species can reach a size of about 6 millimetres (0.24 in).
