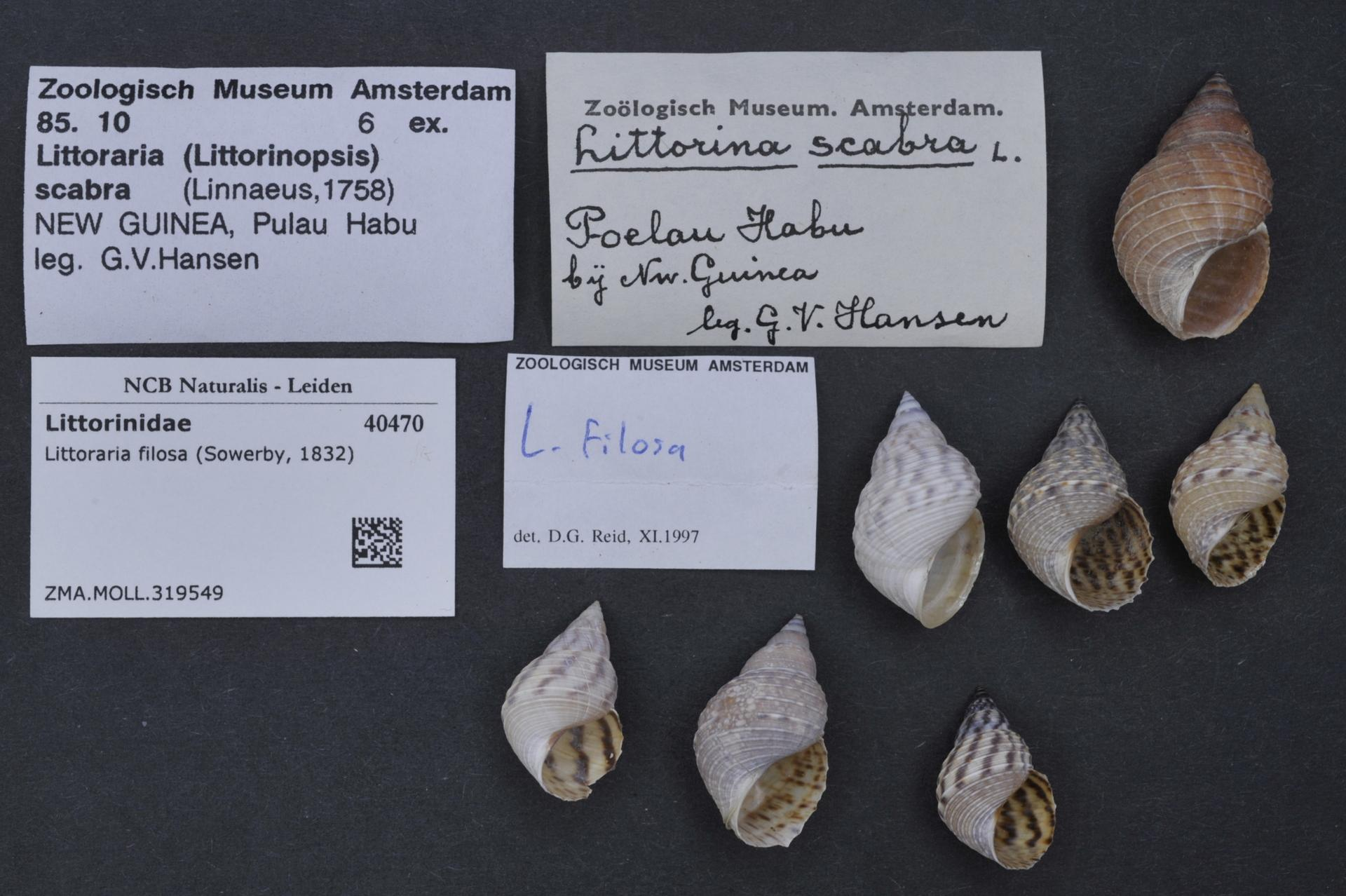

Scientific classification
- Kingdom: Animalia
- Phylum: Mollusca
- Class: Gastropoda
- Subclass: Caenogastropoda
- Order: Littorinimorpha
- Family: Littorinidae
- Genus: Littoraria
- Species: L. filosa

Binomial name
- Littoraria filosa (G.B. Sowerby I, 1832)

Synonyms
- Littorina filosa G. B. Sowerby I, 1832

= Littoraria filosa =

Species of gastropod

Littoraria filosa is a species of sea snail, a marine gastropod mollusk in the family Littorinidae, the winkles or periwinkles.
