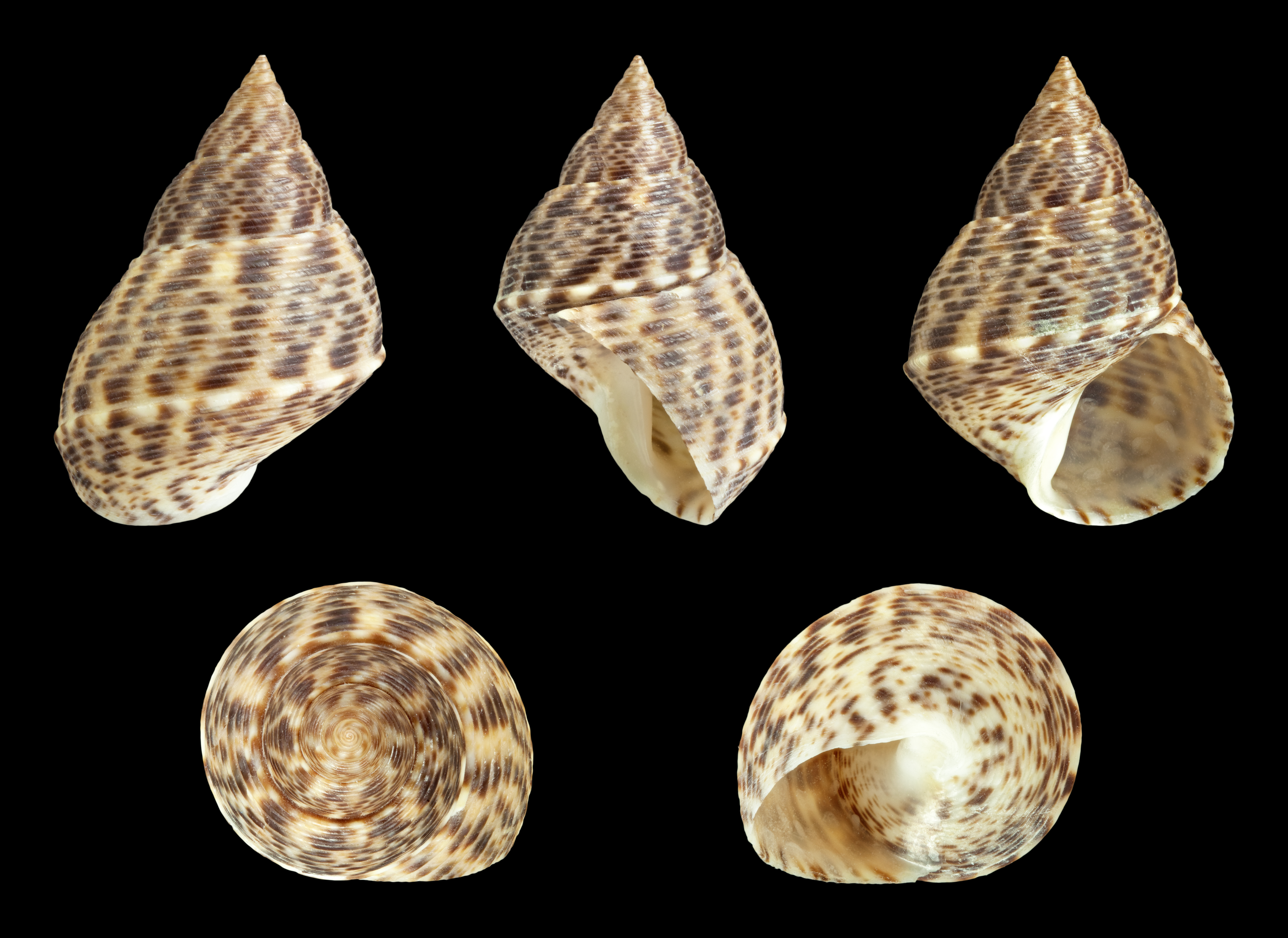

Scientific classification
- Kingdom: Animalia
- Phylum: Mollusca
- Class: Gastropoda
- Subclass: Caenogastropoda
- Order: Littorinimorpha
- Family: Littorinidae
- Genus: Littoraria
- Species: L. scabra

Binomial name
- Littoraria scabra (Linnaeus, 1758)

Synonyms
- Buccinulum (Evarnula) multilineum Powell, A.W.B., 1929; Buccinum foliorum Gmelin, 1791; Buccinum lineatum Gmelin, 1791; Helix scabra Linnaeus, 1758; Litorina scabra var. punctata Philippi, 1847; Litorina scabra var. rubra Philippi, 1847; Littorina novaehiberniae Lesson, 1831; Littorina pallescens var. erronea Nevill, 1885; Littorina scabra (Linnaeus, 1758); Littorina scabra tenuis Nevill, 1885; Melarhaphe scabra (Linnaeus, 1758); Turbo striatus Linnaeus, C. in Schumacher, H.C.F., 1838

= Littoraria scabra =

Species of gastropod

Littoraria scabra, known by its common name mangrove periwinkle, is a species of sea snail, a marine gastropod mollusk in the family Littorinidae, the winkles or periwinkles.

== Distribution and habitat ==
This species is distributed in the Red Sea, the Indian Ocean along Aldabra, Chagos, South Africa, Kenya, Madagascar, the Mascarene Basin, Mauritius, Mozambique, the Seychelles and Tanzania; in the Pacific Ocean along Hawaii and New Zealand. These snails live on rocky shores and on the mangroves.

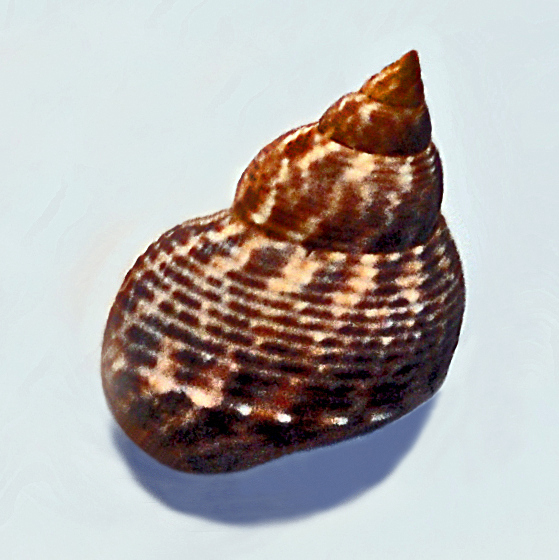
A shell of Littoraria scabra

== Description ==
The size of an adult shell of Littoraria scabra varies between 15 mm and 40 mm. These shells are ovate-conical, without an umbilicus. The outer surface shows a spiral sculpture without nodules, with a pattern of irregular dark stripes. As in other bark-living snail species the shell color is brown. The mouth is rounded and the radula quite long, in order to adapt to the surface or the bark.

== Biology ==
These snails are grazers on the roots, trunks, branches, and leaves of their host plants where they feed on zooplankton, bacteria, algae and mangrove tissues. These generalist herbivores daily vertically migrate along mangrove trees to avoid tidal submersion.

== Bibliography ==
- Barry Wilson – Australian Marine Shells Part 1
- Deepak Apte – The Book of Indian Shells – Bombay Natural History Society, 1998
- Hsi-Jen Tao – Shells of Taiwan Illustrated in Colour
- Reid, D.G. (1986). The littorinid molluscs of mangrove forests in the Indo-Pacific region – British Museum (Natural History), London
- Robert Tucker Abbott – Seashells of Southeast Asia – Graham Brash, 1991
- Rosewater, J. 1970. The family Littorinidae in the Indo-Pacific. Part I. The subfamily Littorininae. – Indo-Pac. Moll.,2(11):417–506.
- Rosewater, J. 1972. The family Littorinidae in the Indo-Pacific. Part II. The subfamilies Tectariinae and Echininae. Indo-Pac. Moll., 2(12):507–528
