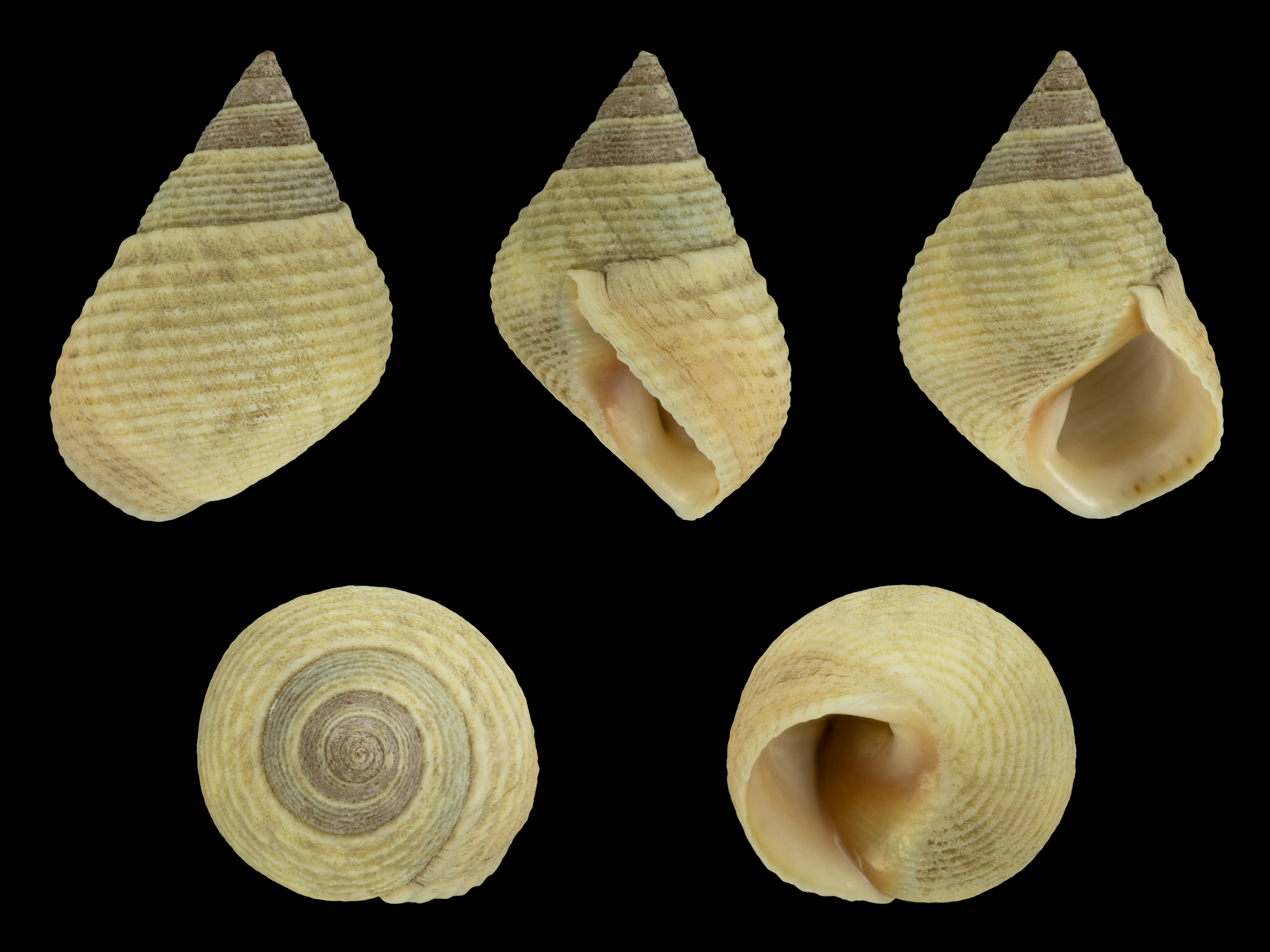

Scientific classification
- Kingdom: Animalia
- Phylum: Mollusca
- Class: Gastropoda
- Subclass: Caenogastropoda
- Order: Littorinimorpha
- Family: Littorinidae
- Genus: Littoraria
- Species: L. irrorata

Binomial name
- Littoraria irrorata Say, 1822

Synonyms
- Littorina irrorata (Say, 1822); Turbo irroratus Say, 1822

= Littoraria irrorata =

Species of gastropod

Littoraria irrorata, also known by the common name the marsh periwinkle, is a species of sea snail, a marine gastropod mollusk in the family Littorinidae. The specific epithet irrorata means 'moistened' or 'dewy.'

This species occurs in salt marshes on the Atlantic coast and Gulf Coast of North America, from Massachusetts to Texas.

Some colonies of this species of snail are the only mollusks known to practice fungiculture.

L. irrorata is an essential part of the salt marsh ecosystem. This is displayed in its strong relationship with Sporobolus alterniflorus, also known as Spartina alterniflora, a grass commonly found in abundance in salt marshes.

== Description ==
The maximum recorded shell length is 29.2 millimetres (1.15 in). L. irrorata is extremely temperature tolerant. The snail has the ability to retract its foot into its shell when experiencing thermal stress which allows them to avoid water loss by evaporation and survive in high temperatures.

== Distribution ==
This species can be found along Ireland, the Northwest Atlantic Ocean and the Gulf of Mexico. Spatial distributions of L. irrorata in salt marshes likely depend on predation pressures and vary with geography. It is possible that S. alterniflorus stem density plays a role in the local distribution of L. irrorata.

== Ecology ==
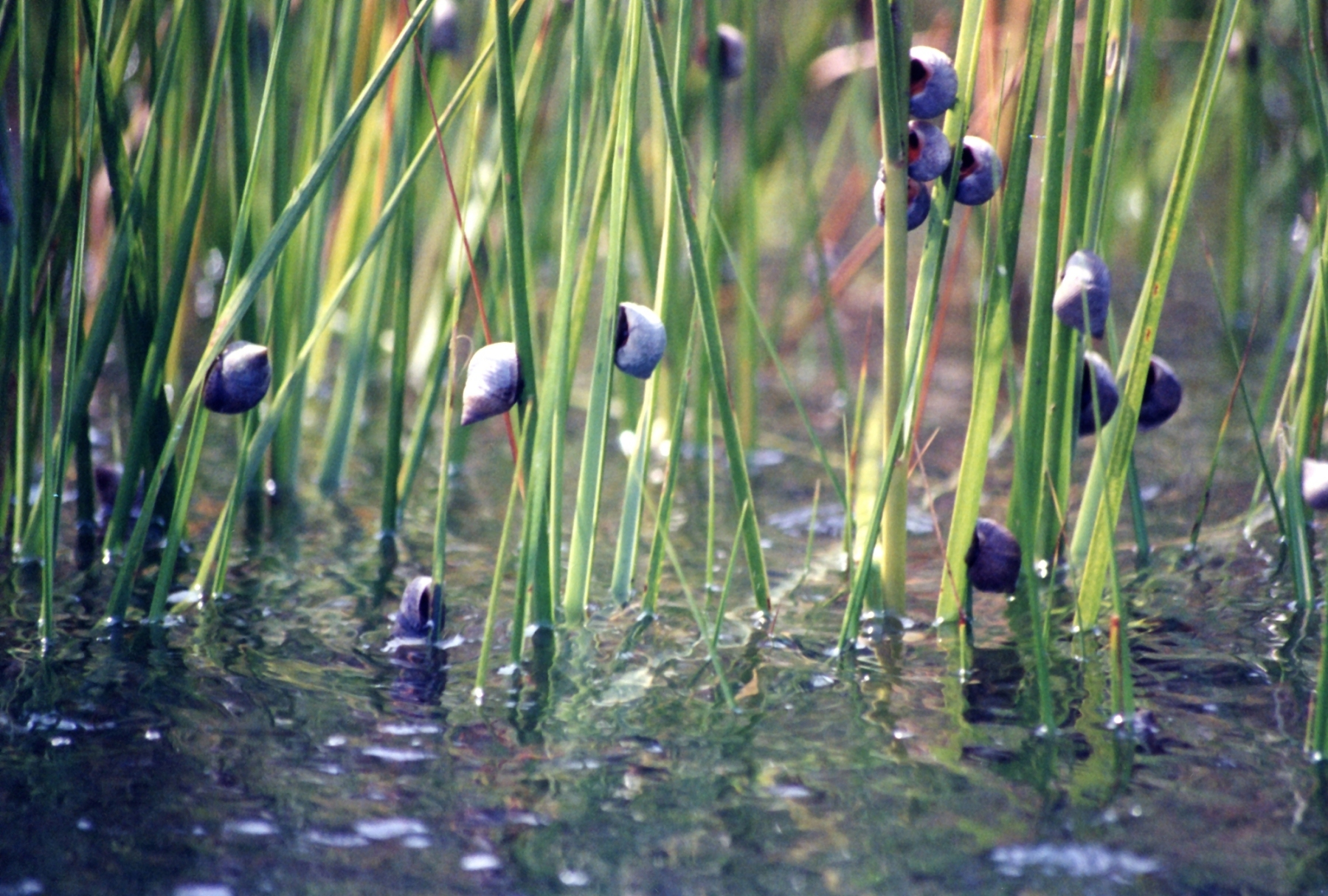
Marsh periwinkles on marsh grass

=== Feeding habits ===
Littoraria irrorata feeds on fungi that it encourages to grow. It creates and maintains wounds on the grass, S. alterniflorus, which are then infected by fungi, probably of the Phaeosphaeria and Mycosphaerella genera. Such fungi are the preferred diet of the snail. L. irrorata also deposits faeces on the wounds that they create, which encourage the growth of the fungi because they are rich in nitrogen and fungal hyphae. Juvenile snails raised on uninfected leaves do not grow and are more likely to die, indicating the importance of the fungi in the diet of L. irrorata. The diet of L. irrorata also consists of algal mats on the salt marsh floor, dead S. alterniflorus, live S. alterniflorus, and marsh sediment. L. irrorata is capable of having a strong top-down control of S. alterniflorus production due to its grazing of the live shoots.

=== Habitat ===
Marsh periwinkle on marsh grass

The minimum recorded depth for this species is 0 metres (0 ft); maximum recorded depth is 22 metres (72 ft). L. irrorata can usually be found on the rootstock of S. alterniflorus and in some salt marshes on its dead, fallen leaves. L. irrorata has also been observed to inhabit Sporobolus cynosuroides. There were no significant differences in snail population density between S. alterniflorus and S. cynosuroides. However, S. cynosuroides was observed to be a safer habitat due to its superior height. The shell size of the snail has been found to increase with decreasing elevation in Virginia salt marshes but the exact opposite has been found in South Carolina and Florida salt marshes.

=== Predation ===
Predators of L. irrorata include blue crabs, diamondback terrapins, clapper rail and raccoons. Predator cues for L. irrorata can be water related as well as airborne. It is likely that chemicals in the incoming tide cue the snails to climb S. alterniflorus. It is also possible that blue crabs give off some compound which is aerosolized and detected by L. irrorata. L. irrorata responds quickest to chemicals released when the shells of other snails are broken.

In order to avoid predation, L. irrorata has the ability increase the thickness of their shell ridge which in turn decreases the size of their aperture opening. This makes it difficult for predators to remove them from their shell. This is an essential function to have as blue crabs are commonly seen chipping away at the shell ridge in order to feed on the snail.

Another method L. irrorata uses to avoid predation is vertical climbing of the grass S. alterniflorus. The snails climb up the grass during high tide to avoid predation and descend during low tide to feed. This is a very effective defense against predators.

=== Impacts of the Deepwater Horizon oil spill ===
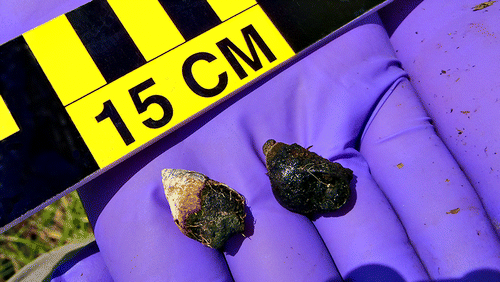
Oil covered marsh periwinkles in a Louisiana salt marsh

The Deepwater Horizon oil spill had major impacts on the productivity, population density, and growth of L. irrorata in salt marshes along the Gulf of Mexico and southeastern United States. Snail densities were reduced by 80-90% on the oil covered salt marsh edges and 50% in the marsh interior. The major loss of adult snails resulted in a reduced mean snail size in salt marshes. It was originally projected that it would take about 3–5 years for the L. irrorata population density to recover from the oil spill. However, snail populations still have not made a full recovery nine years after the oil spill. It is now projected that it could take one to two decades for L. irrorata populations to fully recover at heavily oiled sites.
