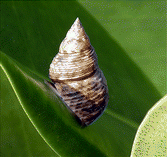
- A live Littoraria pallescens.

Scientific classification
- Kingdom: Animalia
- Phylum: Mollusca
- Class: Gastropoda
- Subclass: Caenogastropoda
- Order: Littorinimorpha
- Family: Littorinidae
- Subfamily: Littorininae
- Genus: Littoraria
- Species: L. pallescens

Binomial name
- Littoraria pallescens (Philippi, 1846)

Synonyms
- Litorina pallescens Philippi, 1846 (original combination); Litorina sieboldii Philippi, 1846; Littorina arboricola Reeve, 1857; Littorina pallescens Philippi, 1846; Littorina sieboldii Philippi, 1846

= Littoraria pallescens =

Species of gastropod

Littoraria pallescens is a species of sea snail, a marine gastropod mollusk in the family Littorinidae, the winkles or periwinkles.

== Distribution ==
This marine species occurs off Vietnam, the Philippines and Indonesia.

== Gallery ==
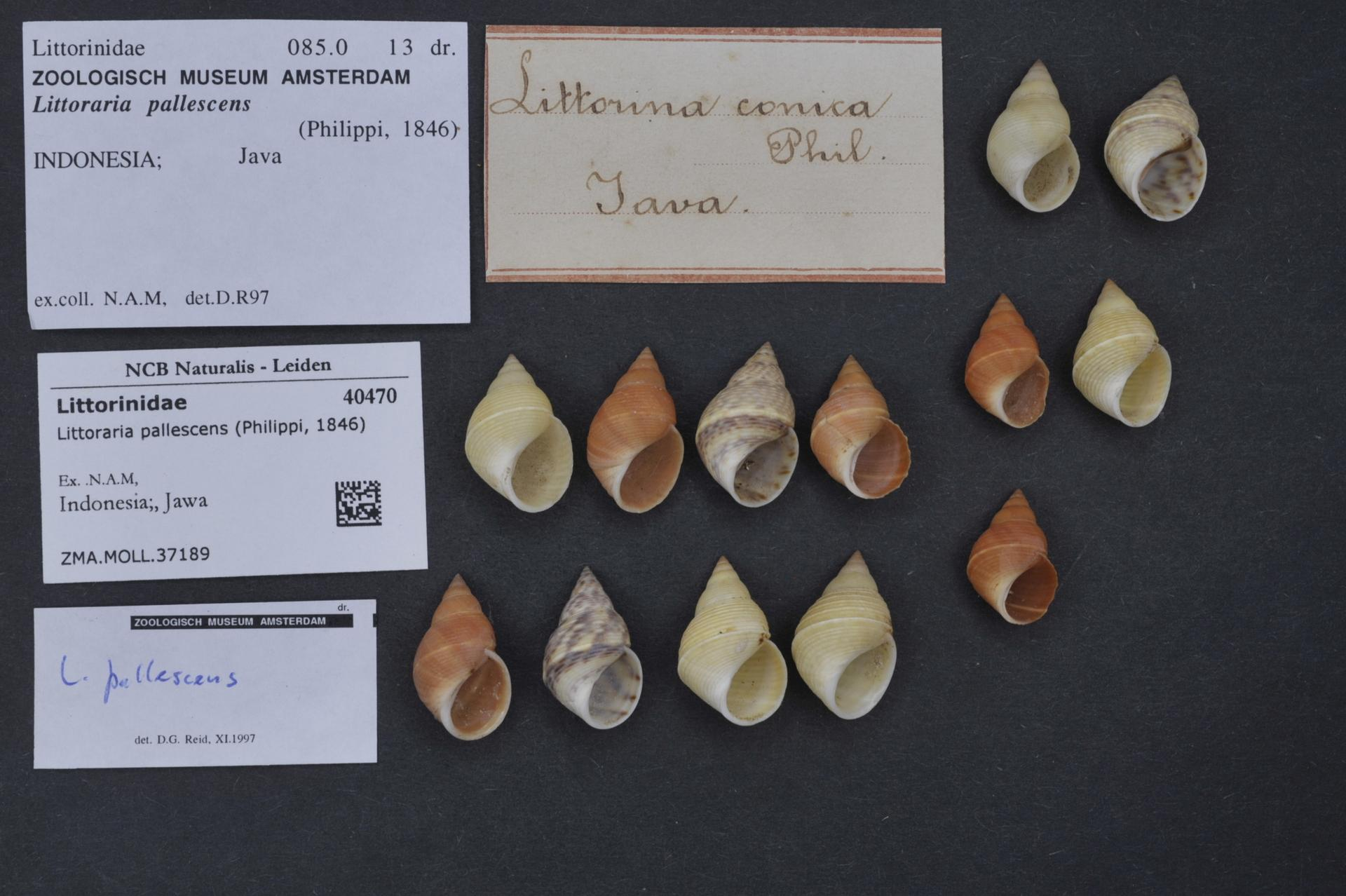
Shells of Littoraria pallescens.

== Ecology ==
Littoraria pallescens is a predominantly mangrove-associated species.
