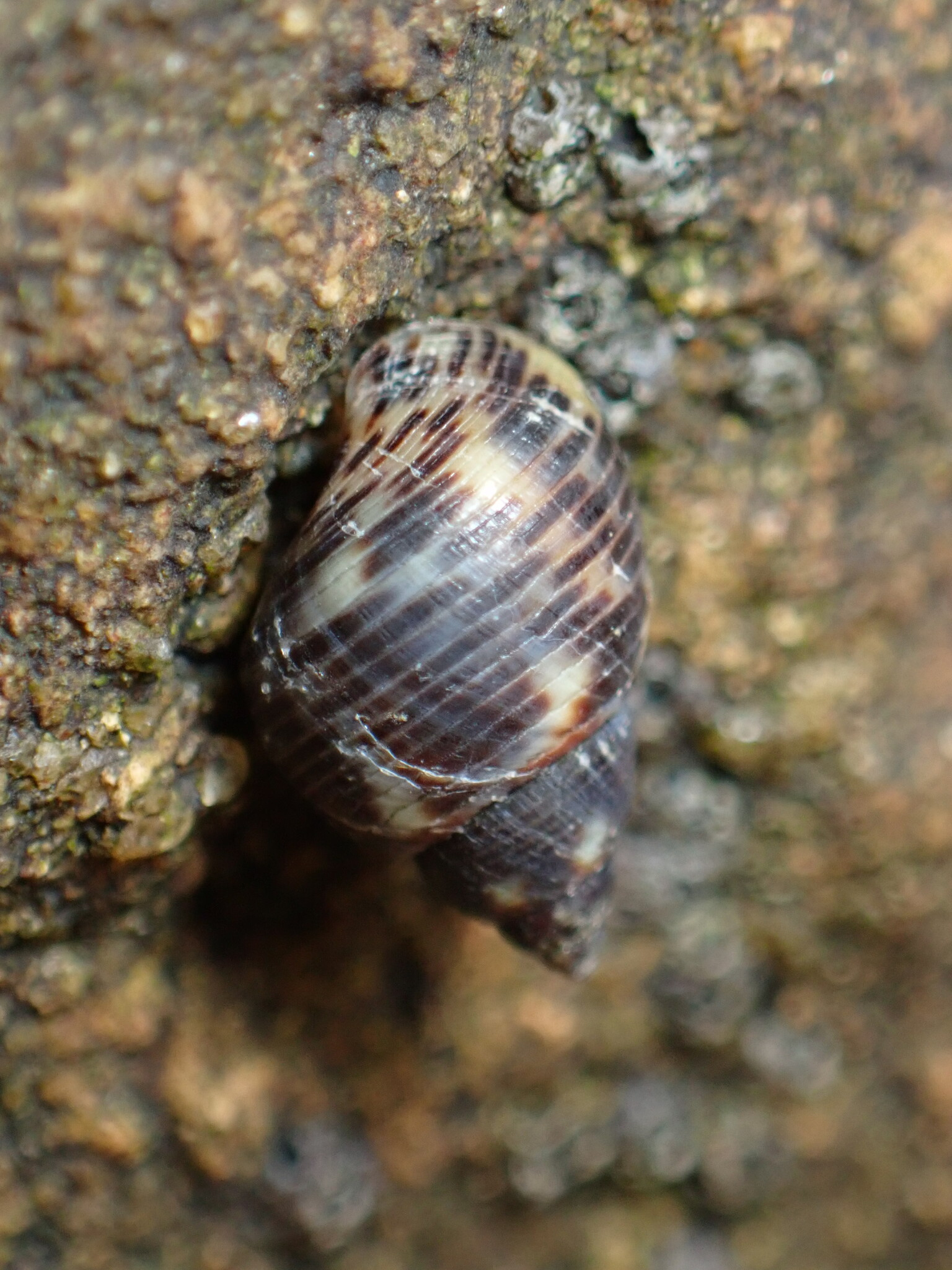

Scientific classification
- Kingdom: Animalia
- Phylum: Mollusca
- Class: Gastropoda
- Subclass: Caenogastropoda
- Order: Littorinimorpha
- Family: Littorinidae
- Genus: Littoraria
- Species: L. articulata

Binomial name
- Littoraria articulata (Philippi, 1846)

Synonyms
- Littorina intermedia var. articulata Philippi, 1846; Melarhaphe blanfordi Dunker, 1871

= Littoraria articulata =

Species of gastropod

Littoraria articulata is a species of sea snail, a marine gastropod mollusc in the family Littorinidae, the winkles or periwinkles.

== Distribution ==
Australia and Vietnam.

== Ecology ==
Littoraria articulata is a predominantly mangrove-associated species.
