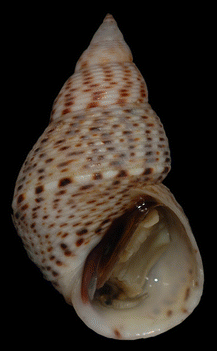
- Littoraria lutea shell

Scientific classification
- Kingdom: Animalia
- Phylum: Mollusca
- Class: Gastropoda
- Subclass: Caenogastropoda
- Order: Littorinimorpha
- Family: Littorinidae
- Genus: Littoraria
- Species: L. lutea

Binomial name
- Littoraria lutea (Philippi, 1847)

Synonyms
- Litorina scabra var. lutea Philippi, 1847

= Littoraria lutea =

Species of gastropod

Littoraria lutea is a species of sea snail, a marine gastropod mollusk in the family Littorinidae, the winkles or periwinkles.

== Distribution ==
This marine species occurs off the Philippines and Vietnam.

== Ecology ==
Littoraria lutea is a predominantly mangrove-associated species.
