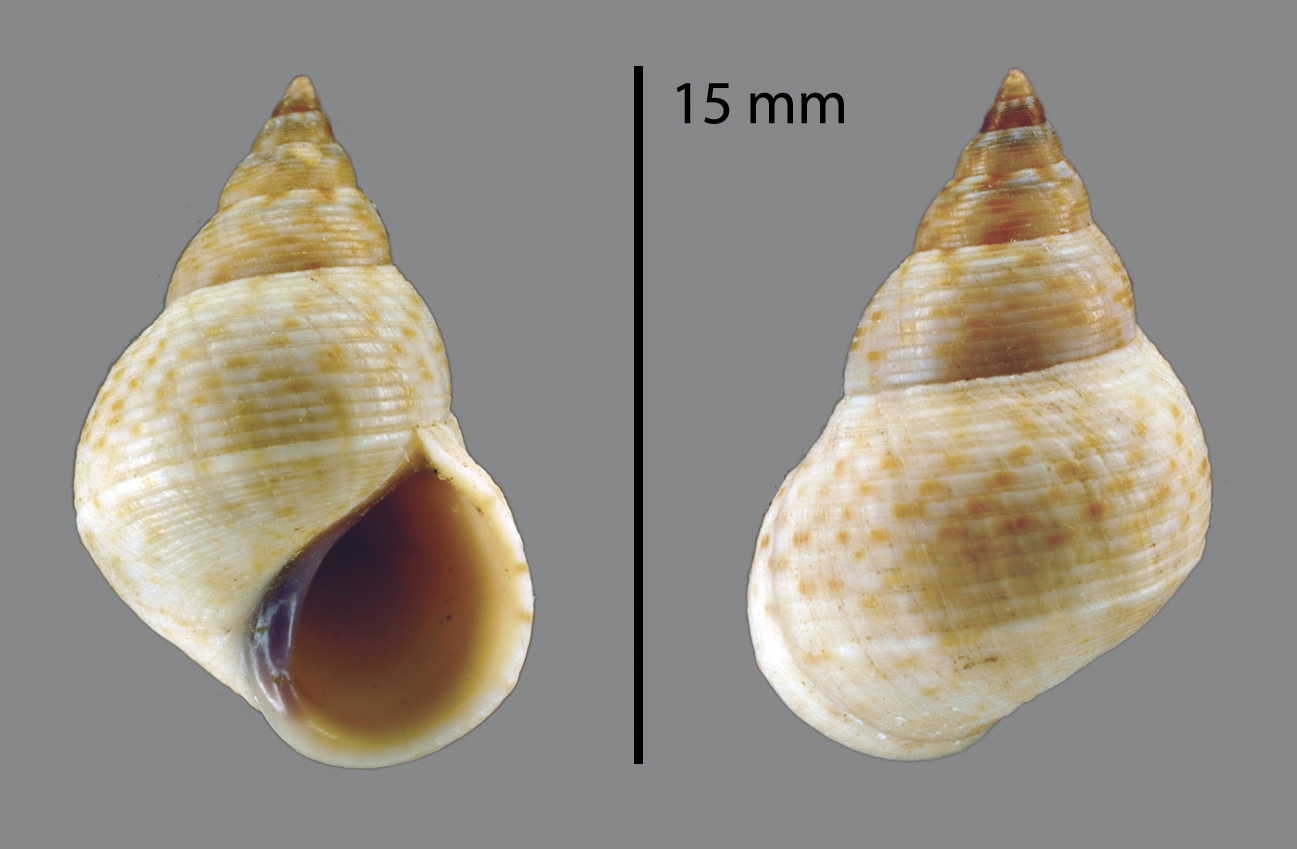
- Shell of Littoraria undulata (specimen at MNHN, Paris)

Conservation status
- Least Concern (IUCN 3.1)

Scientific classification
- Kingdom: Animalia
- Phylum: Mollusca
- Class: Gastropoda
- Subclass: Caenogastropoda
- Order: Littorinimorpha
- Family: Littorinidae
- Genus: Littoraria
- Species: L. undulata

Binomial name
- Littoraria undulata (Gray, 1839)

Synonyms
- Litorina tenuis Philippi, 1846 (junior synonym); Littorina (Littoraria) undulata Gray, 1839; Littorina acuminata Gould, 1849; Littorina undulata (Gray, 1839); Melarhaphe undulata (Gray, 1839)

= Littoraria undulata =

Species of gastropod

Littoraria undulata, common name the robust shell, is a species of sea snail, a marine gastropod mollusk in the family Littorinidae, the winkles or periwinkles.

== Description ==
Up to 2 cm, with dull brown coloration, occasionally darker on upper whorls, and with very faint pattern of wide zigzag lines (pattern fading in larger specimens).

Habitat: on rocks, mangrove trunks and drift wood.

== Distribution ==
This species occurs in the Indo-Pacific Region and off the Philippines.
