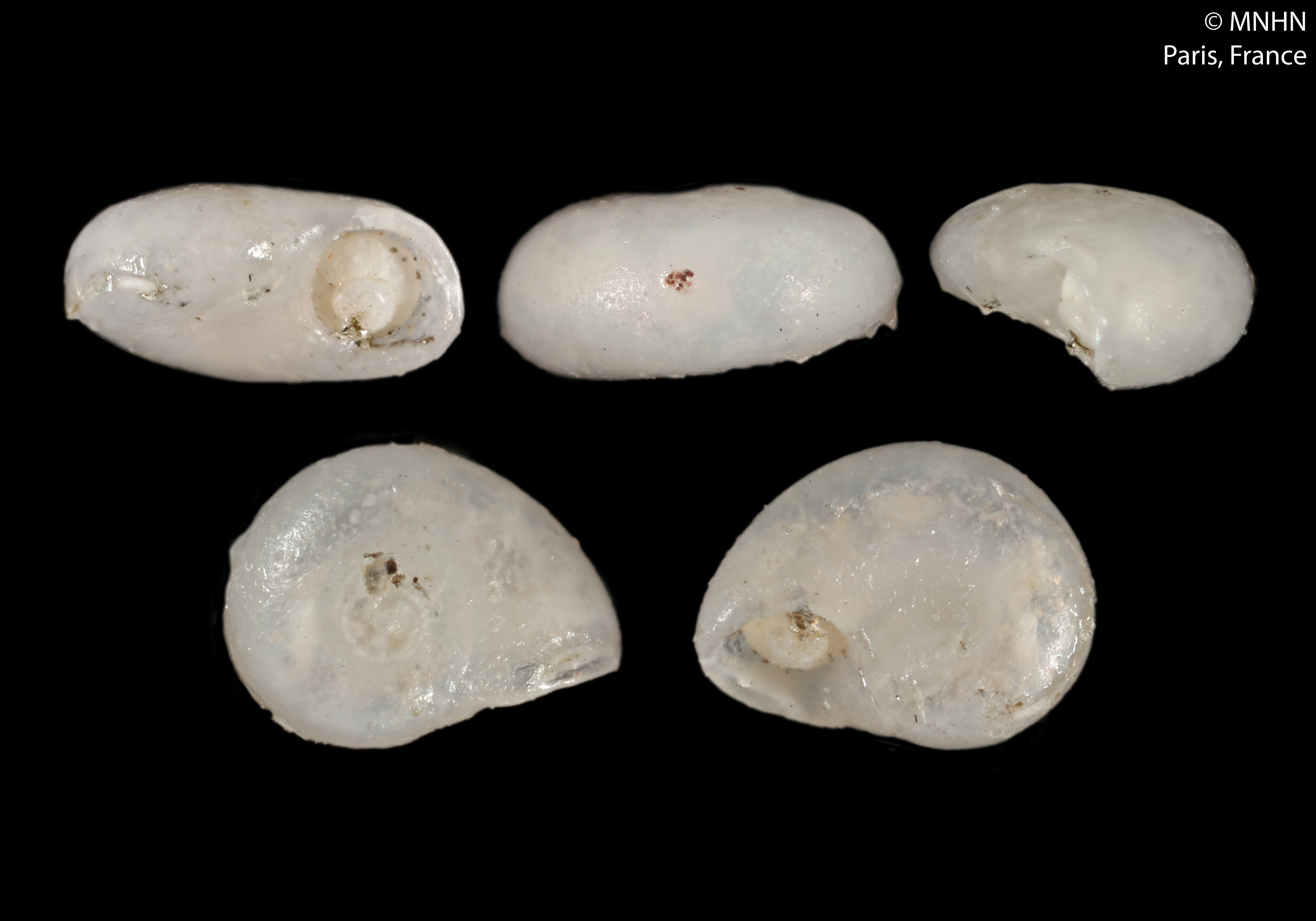
- Shell of Teinostoma carbonnieri (syntype at MNHN, Paris)

Scientific classification
- Kingdom: Animalia
- Phylum: Mollusca
- Class: Gastropoda
- Subclass: Caenogastropoda
- Order: Littorinimorpha
- Superfamily: Truncatelloidea
- Family: Teinostomatidae
- Genus: Teinostoma; H. Adams and A. Adams, 1853

Type species
- Teinostoma politum A. Adams, 1853

Synonyms
- Pseudorotella P. Fischer, 1857; Teinostoma (Annulicallus) Pilsbry & McGinty, 1945; Teinostoma (Ellipetylus) Pilsbry & McGinty, 1945; Teinostoma (Pseudorotella) P. Fischer, 1857; Teinostoma (Teinostoma) H. Adams & A. Adams, 1853 · alternate representation; Tinostoma P. Fischer, 1885

= Teinostoma =

Genus of gastropods

Teinostoma is a genus of minute sea snails, marine gastropod mollusks or micromollusks in the family Teinostomatidae.

This genus used to be placed within the family Skeneidae or family Tornidae(as subfamily Teinostomatinae Cossmann, 1917)

== Shell description ==
The shells of species in this genus are usually white and glossy, are transparent when fresh, and are only a few millimeters in maximum size.

The shell is orbicular, depressed, subspiral and polished. The body whorl is rounded at the periphery. The umbilical region is covered with a large, flat callosity. The aperture is transverse, rounded, greatly produced and elongated, ending anteriorly in a slightly canaliculated point. The inner lip is smooth, callous, not emarginate or truncate anteriorly. The outer lip is thin, simple, not margined or reflected.

== Type species ==
There were two species cited along with the description of Teinostoma by H. & A. Adams (1853) but one of them, Teinostoma anomalum C. B. Adams, was nomen nudum, therefore leaving Teinostoma politum A. Adams, made available therein by a figure, as type species by monotypy. ICZN art. 67.2.1. defines "originally included nominal species" to comprise only species that have been cited in the original publication by an available name. The intended description of Teinostoma as "new genus" by A. Adams appeared only later (1855) and there T. politum is the sole included species.

== Species ==
This genus includes the following species:

- Teinostoma abditum Rolán, Rubio & Ryall, 2000
- Teinostoma abnorme E. A. Smith, 1890
- Teinostoma africanum (E. A. Smith, 1904)
- Teinostoma aloysii Selli, 1974
- Teinostoma altum Pilsbry, 1953
- Teinostoma americanum Pilsbry & Olsson, 1945
- Teinostoma amplectans Carpenter, 1857
- Teinostoma anastomosis Rubio, Rolán & Lee, 2011
- Teinostoma atomaria (A. Adams, 1861)
- Teinostoma avunculus Pilsbry, 1953
- Teinostoma azoricum (Dautzenberg & Fischer H., 1896)
- Teinostoma baldingeri Rubio, Fernández-Garcés & Rolán, 2011
- Teinostoma bibbianum Dall, 1919
- Teinostoma biscaynense Pilsbry & McGinty, 1945
- Teinostoma brankovitsi Rubio, Rolán, Worsaae, Martínez & Gonzalez, 2016
- Teinostoma callosum Thiele, 1925
- Teinostoma cansadoi Adam & Knudsen, 1969
- Teinostoma carbonnieri Jousseaume, 1881
- Teinostoma carinicallus Pilsbry & McGinty, 1946
- Teinostoma cecinella Dall, 1919
- Teinostoma cienfuegosense Rubio, Fernández-Garcés & Rolán, 2011
- Teinostoma circularis Talavera, 1975
- Teinostoma ciskae Faber, 1995
- Teinostoma cocolitoris Pilsbry & McGinty, 1945
- † Teinostoma complanatum Deshayes, 1864
- Teinostoma concavaxis Pilsbry & Olsson, 1945
- Teinostoma concentricum A. Adams, 1863
- Teinostoma deschampsi Jousseaume, 1881
- Teinostoma diotrephes (Melvill, 1910)
- Teinostoma ecuadorianum Pilsbry & Olsson, 1941
- † Teinostoma elegans Deshayes, 1864
- Teinostoma esmeralda Pilsbry & Olsson, 1945
- Teinostoma expansum Rubio, Fernández-Garcés & Rolán, 2011
- Teinostoma fernandesi Rubio & Rolán, 1991
- Teinostoma funiculatum Rubio & Rolán, 1991
- † Teinostoma gallegosi Jordan, 1936
- Teinostoma goniogyrus Pilsbry & McGinty, 1945
- Teinostoma helicinum Rubio, Fernández-Garcés & Rolán, 2011
- Teinostoma hemphilli Strong & Hertlein, 1939
- Teinostoma herbertianum Hertlein & Strong, 1951
- † Teinostoma hosdenacense Cossmann, 1888
- Teinostoma hyalinum Thiele, 1925
- Teinostoma imperfectum Pilsbry & Olsson, 1945
- Teinostoma incertum Pilsbry & McGinty, 1945
- Teinostoma inconspicuum Thiele, 1925
- Teinostoma invallatum (Carpenter, 1864)
- Teinostoma involutum Hedley, 1902
- Teinostoma jucundum (Melvill, 1904)
- Teinostoma lampetes Pilsbry & Olsson, 1952
- Teinostoma lenticulare (H.C. Lea, 1846)
- Teinostoma lerema Pilsbry & McGinty, 1945
- Teinostoma lirulatum (Carpenter, 1857)
- Teinostoma lituspalmarum Pilsbry & McGinty, 1945
- Teinostoma lucidum A. Adams, 1863
- Teinostoma lunense Rubio, Fernández-Garcés & Rolán, 2011
- † Teinostoma margaritula Deshayes, 1864
- Teinostoma megacallum Rubio, Fernández-Garcés & Rolán, 2011
- Teinostoma megastoma (C. B. Adams, 1850)
- Teinostoma millepunctatum Pilsbry & Olsson, 1945
- Teinostoma minusculum (Bush, 1897)
- † Teinostoma minutum (Conti, 1864)
- † Teinostoma mite Deshayes, 1864
- Teinostoma morlierei Jousseaume, 1872
- Teinostoma multisulcatum Dautzenberg & H. Fischer, 1907
- Teinostoma myrae Pilsbry & Olsson, 1952
- † Teinostoma nanum (Grateloup, 1832)
- Teinostoma narina Pilsbry & Olsson, 1945
- Teinostoma nesaeum Pilsbry & McGinty, 1945
- † Teinostoma obesum Landau, Ceulemans & Van Dingenen, 2018
- Teinostoma obtectum Pilsbry & McGinty, 1945
- Teinostoma ochsneri Strong & Hertlein, 1939
- Teinostoma oppletum Hedley, 1898
- Teinostoma pallidulum (Carpenter, 1847)
- Teinostoma panamense Rubio, Rolán & Lee, 2011
- Teinostoma parvicallum Pilsbry & McGinty, 1945
- Teinostoma percarinatum Pilsbry & Olsson, 1945
- Teinostoma perspicuum (A. Adams, 1861)
- Teinostoma politum A. Adams, 1853
- † Teinostoma priscum Deshayes, 1863
- Teinostoma radiatum A. Adams, 1863
- Teinostoma rarum Pilsbry & Olsson, 1945
- Teinostoma reclusum Dall, 1889
- Teinostoma rhinoceros Jousseaume, 1881
- † Teinostoma rotellaeforme Deshayes, 1864
- Teinostoma sapiella Dall, 1919
- Teinostoma semistriatum (d'Orbigny, 1842)
- Teinostoma shepstonense Tomlin, 1926
- Teinostoma sibogae Schepman, 1908
- Teinostoma solidum E. A. Smith, 1872
- Teinostoma solidum (Dall, 1889) (This is a secondary homonym of Teinostoma solida [sic] E. A. Smith, 1871, from West Africa. As its generic placement is not final, the name may remain valid if allocated to another genus.)
- Teinostoma soror Pilsbry & Olsson, 1945
- † Teinostoma striatissimum Deshayes, 1864
- Teinostoma substriatum Carpenter, 1857
- Teinostoma sulcatum (Carpenter, 1857)
- Teinostoma supravallatum (Carpenter, 1864)
- Teinostoma tectispira Pilsbry, 1953
- † Teinostoma trigonostoma Deshayes, 1864
- Teinostoma tumens (Carpenter, 1857)
- Teinostoma ultimum Pilsbry & Olsson, 1945
- Teinostoma umbilicatum (H. C. Lea, 1843)
- Teinostoma vayssierei Couturier, 1907
- Teinostoma zacae Hertlein & Strong, 1951

Taxa inquirenda

- Teinostoma carpenteri A. Adams, 1861
- Teinostoma hidalgoana Pilsbry, 1895
- Teinostoma parvum (Stimpson, 1851) (nomen dubium)

== Synonyms ==
- Teinostoma alfredensis Bartsch, 1915: synonym of Teinostoma africanum (E. A. Smith, 1904) (junior synonym)
- Teinostoma azoricum (Dautzenberg & H. Fischer, 1896): synonym of Seamountiella azorica (Dautzenberg & H. Fischer, 1896)
- Teinostoma bartschi Vanatta, 1913: synonym of Solariorbis infracarinatus (Gabb, 1881)
- † Teinostoma calliglyptum Dall, 1903: synonym of † Anticlimax calliglypta (Dall, 1903) (original combination)
- Teinostoma clavium Pilsbry & McGinty, 1945: synonym of Teinostoma semistriatum (d'Orbigny, 1842)
- Teinostoma cryptospira (A. E. Verrill, 1884): synonym of Teinostoma umbilicatum (H. C. Lea, 1843)
- Teinostoma dalli Dautzenberg, 1912 : synonym of Leucorhynchia punctata (Jousseaume, 1872)
- Teinostoma emmeles Melvill, 1910: synonym of Eunaticina emmeles (Melvill, 1910)
- Teinostoma floridense (Dall, 1927): synonym of Cirsonella floridensis (Dall, 1927)
- Teinostoma funiculus Dall, 1892: synonym of Vitrinella funiculus (Dall, 1892)
- Teinostoma hondurasensis Vanatta, 1913: synonym of Solariorbis hondurasensis (Vanatta, 1913)
- Teinostoma involuta Hedley, 1902: synonym of Teinostoma involutum Hedley, 1902 (incorrect gender agreement of specific epithet)
- Teinostoma millepunctatum Nowell-Usticke, 1969: synonym of Teinostoma ciskae Faber, 1995
- Teinostoma modesta Dall, 1889: synonym of Dillwynella modesta (Dall, 1889)
- † Teinostoma opsitelotus Dall, 1892: synonym of † Vitrinella opsitelotus (Dall, 1892)
- Teinostoma orbitum Hedley, 1900: synonym of Caperella orbita (Hedley, 1900) (original combination)
- Teinostoma pilsbryi McGinty, 1945: synonym of Anticlimax pilsbryi (McGinty, 1945)
- Teinostoma proboscidea Aguayo, 1949: synonym of Anticlimax proboscidea (Aguayo, 1949)
- Teinostoma punctatum Jousseaume, 1872: synonym of Leucorhynchia punctata (Jousseaume, 1872)
- Teinostoma qualum Hedley, 1899: synonym of Munditiella qualum (Hedley, 1899)
- Teinostoma rotatum Hedley, 1899: synonym of Leucorhynchia rotata (Hedley, 1899) (original combination)
- Teinostoma salvania Dall, 1919: synonym of Vitrinella eshnaurae Bartsch, 1907
- Teinostoma sulcata [sic] : synonym of Pygmaeorota sulcata (A. Adams, 1850)
- Teinostoma schumoi Vanatta, 1913: synonym ofs Solariorbis schumoi (Vanatta, 1913)
- Teinostoma solida E. A. Smith, 1872: synonym of Teinostoma solidum E. A. Smith, 1872 (wrong grammatical agreement of species epithet)
- Teinostoma starkeyae Hedley, 1899: synonym of Starkeyna starkeyae (Hedley, 1899)
- Teinostoma sulcata [sic]: synonym of Pygmaeorota sulcata (A. Adams, 1850): synonym of Circulus sulcatus (A. Adams, 1850) (incorrect gender ending)
- Teinostoma suppressa Dall, 1889: synonym of Cyclostremiscus suppressus (Dall, 1889)
- Teinostoma vesta Hedley, 1901: synonym of Vitrinella vesta (Hedley, 1901) (original combination)
