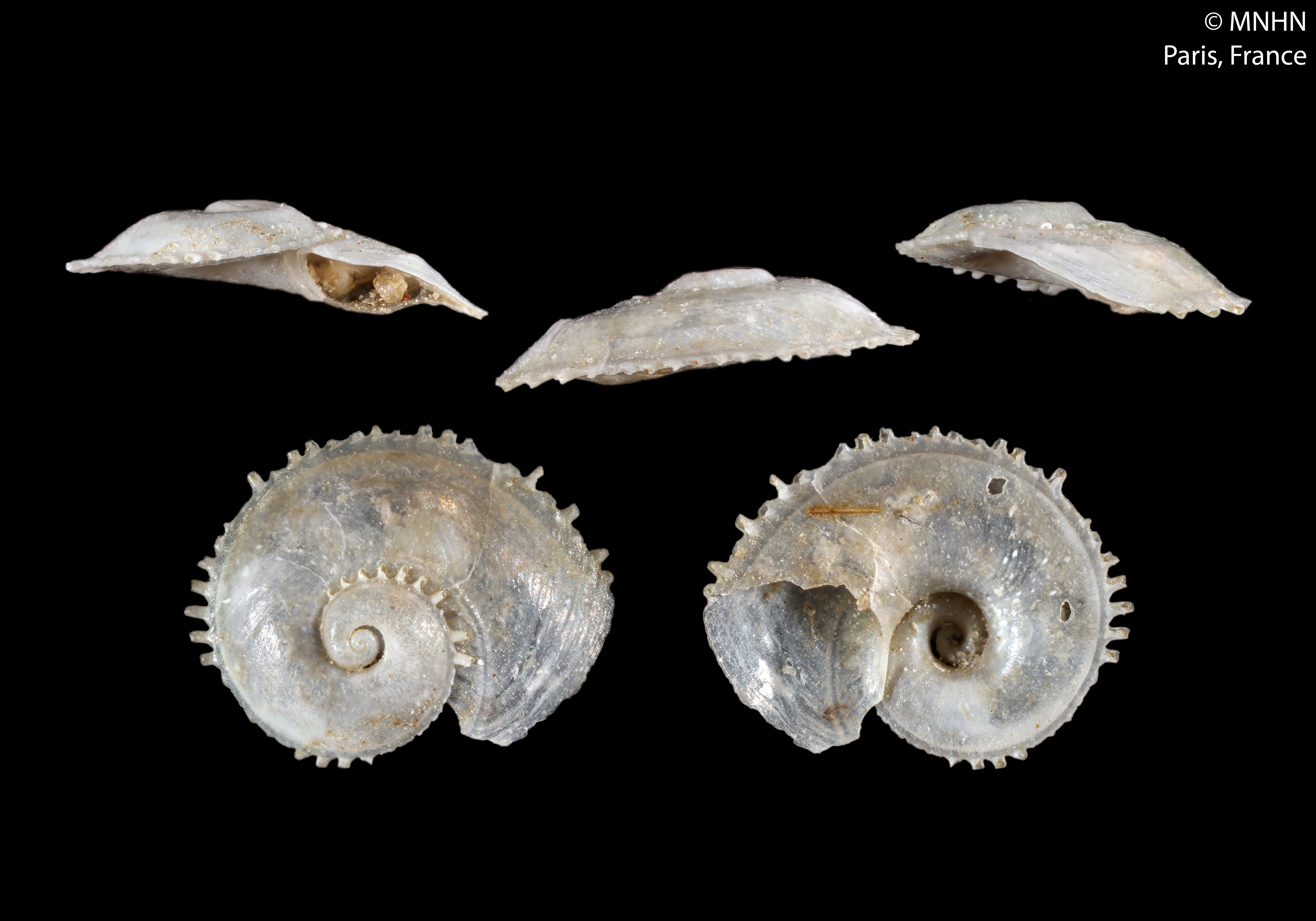
- Shell of Discopsis gruveli (syntype at MNHN, Paris)

Scientific classification
- Kingdom: Animalia
- Phylum: Mollusca
- Class: Gastropoda
- Subclass: Caenogastropoda
- Order: Littorinimorpha
- Superfamily: Truncatelloidea
- Family: Tornidae
- Genus: Discopsis de Folin, 1870

Type species
- Adeorbis omalos de Folin, 1870

Synonyms
- Alleorus A. M. Strong, 1938; Tinostoma (Discopsis) de Folin, 1870

= Discopsis =

Genus of sea snails

Discopsis is a genus of small sea snails, marine gastropod mollusks in the family Tornidae.

== Taxonomy ==
Rolán & Rubio (2002: 46) hold Discopsis as a valid genus, distinct from Cochliolepis Stimpson, 1858, on the grounds that the latter belongs in the family Vitrinellidae and the former in Tornidae. This should be reevaluated in the perspective that both families are considered synonyms. Adam & Knudsen (1969) may have been right in placing the West African species in Cochliolepis.

== Description ==
(Original description in Latin) The shell is discoid and very depressed, with a distinct umbilicus. The aperture is strongly oblique, and its margins are joined across the penultimate whorl by a thickened siphonal canal.

== Species ==
Species within the genus Discopsis include:

- Discopsis aperta Rolán & Rubio, 2002
- † Discopsis canui (de Morgan, 1920)
- Discopsis costulata de Folin, 1870
- Discopsis dautzenbergi (Adam & Knudsen, 1969)
- † Discopsis destefanii Reitano, Di Franco & Scuderi, 2024
- Discopsis deprellus (Strong, 1938)
- † Discopsis europaea (de Stefani, 1888)
- Discopsis exmilitaris Rolán & Rubio, 2002
- † Discopsis falunica (de Morgan, 1920)
- Discopsis ferreirorum Rolán & Rubio, 2002
- Discopsis gruveli (Dautzenberg, 1912)
- Discopsis irregularis Rolán & Rubio, 2002
- Discopsis jullieni (Adam & Knudsen, 1969)
- Discopsis liliae Rolán & Rubio, 2002
- Discopsis militaris (Jousseaume, 1872)
- Discopsis nodulosa Rolán & Rubio, 2002
- Discopsis omalos (de Folin, 1870)
- † Discopsis philippii Reitano, Di Franco & Scuderi, 2024
- † Discopsis pontileviensis (de Morgan, 1920)
- † Discopsis pseudocanui Landau, Ceulemans & Van Dingenen, 2018
- † Discopsis pseudotinostoma (Boettger, 1907)
- Discopsis radians (Rolán & Rubio, 1990)
- Discopsis rara Rolán & Rubio, 2002
- Discopsis reducta (Rolán & Rubio, 1990)
- Discopsis similis Rolán & Rubio, 2002
- † Discopsis trigonostoma (Basterot, 1825) (accepted > unreplaced junior homonym, junior homonym of Delphinula trigonostoma Lamarck, 1822)
- † Discopsis vivianorum Reitano, Di Franco & Scuderi, 2024

Species brought into synonymy

- Discopsis africana Bartsch, 1915 : synonym of Cochliolepis planulata (G.B. Sowerby III, 1892)
- Discopsis alfredensis Bartsch, 1915: synonym of Macromphalina alfredensis (Bartsch, 1915)
- Discopsis apertus Rolán & Rubio, 2002 : synonym of Discopsis aperta Rolán & Rubio, 2002 (wrong gender agreement of specific epithet)
- Discopsis costulatus de Folin, 1870 : synonym of Discopsis costulata de Folin, 1870 (wrong gender agreement of specific epithet)
- Discopsis exmilitare Rolán & Rubio, 2002 : synonym of Discopsis exmilitaris Rolán & Rubio, 2002 (wrong gender agreement of specific epithet)
- Discopsis niasensis Thiele, 1925: synonym of Anticlimax niasensis (Thiele, 1925)
- Discopsis nodulosus Rolán & Rubio, 2002 : synonym of Discopsis nodulosa Rolán & Rubio, 2002 (wrong gender agreement of specific epithet)
- Discopsis padangensis Thiele, 1925: synonym of Anticlimax padangensis (Thiele, 1925)
- Discopsis rarus Rolán & Rubio, 2002 : synonym of Discopsis rara Rolán & Rubio, 2002 (wrong gender agreement of specific epithet)
- Discopsis turtoni Bartsch, 1915 : synonym of Cochliolepis turtoni (Bartsch, 1915) (original combination)
