= Aorotrema pontogenes =

Scientific classification
- Kingdom: Animalia
- Phylum: Mollusca
- Class: Gastropoda
- Subclass: Caenogastropoda
- Order: Littorinimorpha
- Superfamily: Truncatelloidea
- Family: Tornidae
- Genus: Aorotrema
- Species: A. pontogenes

Binomial name
- Aorotrema pontogenes (Schwengel & T. L. McGinty, 1942)

Synonyms
- Cyclostrema (Aorotrema) pontogenes Schwengel & T. L. McGinty, 1942 (original combination); Cyclostrema pontogenes Schwengel & T. L. McGinty, 1942 (unaccepted combination)

Species of gastropod

Aorotrema pontogenes is a minute sea snail, a marine gastropod mollusc in the family Tornidae.

== Distribution ==
This marine species occurs off Florida, USA.
