= Circlotoma =

Scientific classification
- Kingdom: Animalia
- Phylum: Mollusca
- Class: Gastropoda
- Subclass: Caenogastropoda
- Order: Littorinimorpha
- Superfamily: Truncatelloidea
- Family: Tornidae
- Genus: Circlotoma; Laseron, 1958

Genus of gastropods

Circlotoma is a genus of sea snails, marine gastropod mollusks in the family Tornidae within the superfamily Truncatelloidea.

== Species ==
Species within the genus Circlotoma include:

- Circlotoma bellatula Feng, 1996
- Circlotoma callusa Laseron, 1958
- Circlotoma planorbis Laseron, 1958
- Circlotoma rotata Laseron, 1958
- Circlotoma transculpta Laseron, 1958
- Circlotoma venusta (Hedley, 1901)
