= Aorotrema =

Scientific classification
- Kingdom: Animalia
- Phylum: Mollusca
- Class: Gastropoda
- Subclass: Caenogastropoda
- Order: Littorinimorpha
- Family: Tornidae
- Genus: Aorotrema; Schwengel & McGinty, 1942

Type species
- Cyclostrema pontogenes Schwengel & McGinty, 1942

Synonyms
- Cyclostrema (Aorotrema) Schwengel & T. L. McGinty, 1942 (original combination)

Genus of gastropods

Aorotrema is a genus of sea snails, marine gastropod mollusks in the family Tornidae within the superfamily Truncatelloidea.

== Species ==
Species within the genus Aorotrema include:

- Aorotrema cistronium (Dall, 1889)
- Aorotrema humboldti (Hertlein & Strong, 1951)
- Aorotrema pontogenes (Schwengel & McGinty, 1942)

Species brought into synonymy

- Aorotrema erraticum Pilsbry & McGinty, 1945: synonym of Turbo castanea Gmelin, 1791
