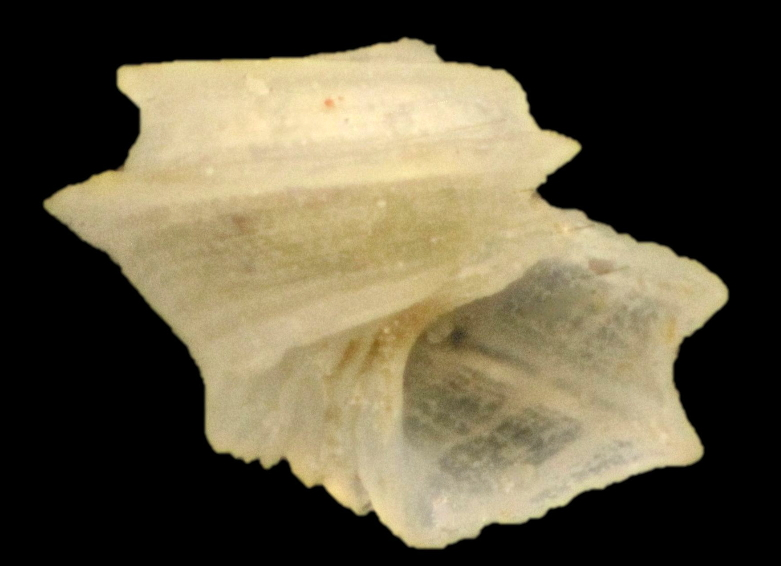
- Shell of Aorotrema cistronium (specimen at Naturalis Biodiversity <center)

Scientific classification
- Kingdom: Animalia
- Phylum: Mollusca
- Class: Gastropoda
- Subclass: Caenogastropoda
- Order: Littorinimorpha
- Superfamily: Truncatelloidea
- Family: Tornidae
- Genus: Aorotrema
- Species: A. cistronium

Binomial name
- Aorotrema cistronium (Dall, 1889)

Synonyms
- Cyclostrema cistronium Dall, 1889

= Aorotrema cistronium =

Species of gastropod

Aorotrema cistronium is a minute sea snail, a marine gastropod mollusc in the family Tornidae.

== Description ==
(Original description by W. H. Dall) The height of the shell attains 2.5 mm. The maximum diameter is 2 mm. The small, white shell has a polished nucleus, one and a half rounded and as many more carinated whorls. The spire is depressed. The radiating sculpture consists of fine close flexuous threads, which appear chiefly in the interspaces of the spirals, giving the surface a minutely punctate appearance. These extend over the whole surface except of the nuclear whorls. The spiral sculpture consists of on the summit seven or eight, between the carinae six or eight, and on the base ten or fifteen extremely fine threads. These are even and uniform, with about equal interspaces, some a little granular from the radiating sculpture. Beside these there are three very strong carinae;. One forms the margin of the nearly flat spire, the second extends horizontally just below the periphery. The space between them is deeply excavated. The third forms the edge of the funicular, narrow, deep umbilicus. The base is conical, excavated just within the peripheral carina. It rises to the edge of the umbilicus, which is marked by a strong thread, and within is vertically striated. The body whorl descends from the general plane, and finally becomes separated from the body whorl. The simple margin is sharply angulated by the carinations, otherwise the aperture would be ovate, with the columellar side somewhat excavated.

== Distribution ==
This species occurs in the Atlantic Ocean off North Carolina and in the Gulf of Mexico off Texas at depths between 14 m and 115 m.
