= Teinostoma fernandesi =

Conservation status
- Data Deficient (IUCN 2.3)

Scientific classification
- Kingdom: Animalia
- Phylum: Mollusca
- Class: Gastropoda
- Subclass: Caenogastropoda
- Order: Littorinimorpha
- Family: Teinostomatidae
- Genus: Teinostoma
- Species: T. fernandesi

Binomial name
- Teinostoma fernandesi Rubio & Rolan, 1991

Species of gastropod

Teinostoma fernandesi is a species of small sea snail, a marine gastropod mollusk or micromollusk in the family Tornidae.

== Distribution ==
This species is endemic to São Tomé and Príncipe.
