= Pseudoliotia radians =

Scientific classification
- Kingdom: Animalia
- Phylum: Mollusca
- Class: Gastropoda
- Subclass: Caenogastropoda
- Order: Littorinimorpha
- Superfamily: Truncatelloidea
- Family: Tornidae
- Genus: Pseudoliotia
- Species: P. radians

Binomial name
- Pseudoliotia radians Laseron, 1958

Synonyms
- Discreliotia radians Laseron, 1958; Discreliotia serrata (Laseron, 1958)

Species of gastropod

Pseudoliotia radians is a species of small sea snail, a marine gastropod mollusk, in the family Tornidae.

== Distribution ==
This marine species occurs off the Northern Territories, Australia
