= Aorotrema humboldti =

Scientific classification
- Kingdom: Animalia
- Phylum: Mollusca
- Class: Gastropoda
- Subclass: Caenogastropoda
- Order: Littorinimorpha
- Superfamily: Truncatelloidea
- Family: Tornidae
- Genus: Aorotrema
- Species: A. humboldti

Binomial name
- Aorotrema humboldti (Hertlein & A. M. Strong, 1951)

Synonyms
- Cyclostremiscus humboldti Hertlein & A. M. Strong, 1951

Species of gastropod

Aorotrema humboldti is a minute sea snail, a marine gastropod mollusc in the family Tornidae.

== Distribution ==
This marine species occurs off Baja California, Mexico and off Costa Rica.
