= Spirostyliferina =

Scientific classification
- Kingdom: Animalia
- Phylum: Mollusca
- Class: Gastropoda
- Subclass: Caenogastropoda
- Order: Littorinimorpha
- Superfamily: Truncatelloidea
- Family: Spirostyliferinidae
- Genus: Spirostyliferina; Bandel, 2006

Type species
- Spirostyliferina lizardensis Bandel, 2006 (type by original designation)

Species
- See text

Synonyms
- Hoenselaaria Moolenbeek, 2009

Genus of gastropods

Spirostyliferina is a genus of pelagic or planktonic sea snails, marine gastropod molluscs in the family Spirostyliferinidae.

== Species ==
- Spirostyliferina lizardensis Bandel, 2006
- Spirostyliferina wareni (Moolenbeek, 2009)
