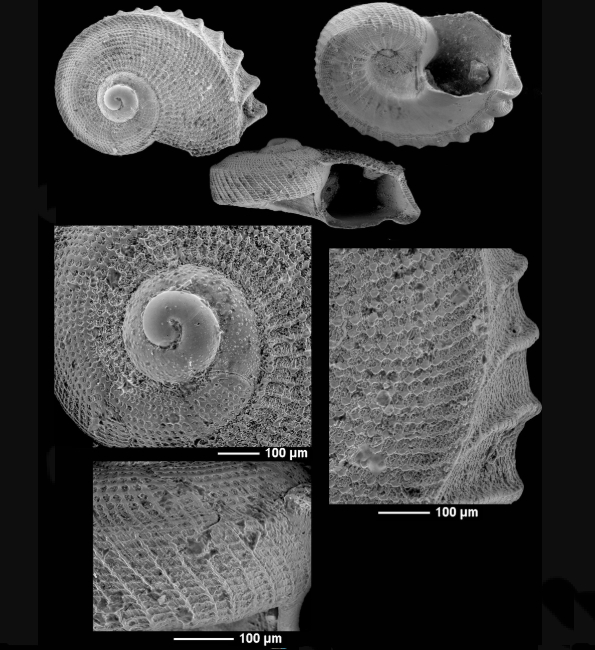
- Shell and protoconch of Anticlimax reinaudi (holotype at the MNHN, Paris)

Scientific classification
- Kingdom: Animalia
- Phylum: Mollusca
- Class: Gastropoda
- Subclass: Caenogastropoda
- Order: Littorinimorpha
- Family: Tornidae
- Genus: Anticlimax
- Species: A. reinaudi

Binomial name
- Anticlimax reinaudi (Rubio & Rolán, 2014)

= Anticlimax reinaudi =

Species of gastropod

Anticlimax reinaudi is a minute sea snail, a marine gastropod mollusc in the family Tornidae.

== Description ==
Anticlimax reinaudi has a very small (<1.5 mm), depressed shell, formed by 3 whorls of rapid growth, separated by a scarcely marked suture. The ornamentation consists of spiral cords, ribs and axial striae. The shell aperture is quadrangular.

== Distribution ==
This species is only known from Vanuatu. It was found North-East of Malo Island, at depths of 13 m, on sand and dead corals.

== Etymology ==
This species is named after Guy Reinaud, President of Pro-Natura International, coorganiser with MNHN of the "Our Planet Reviewed" expeditions, during which the species was discovered in 2006.
