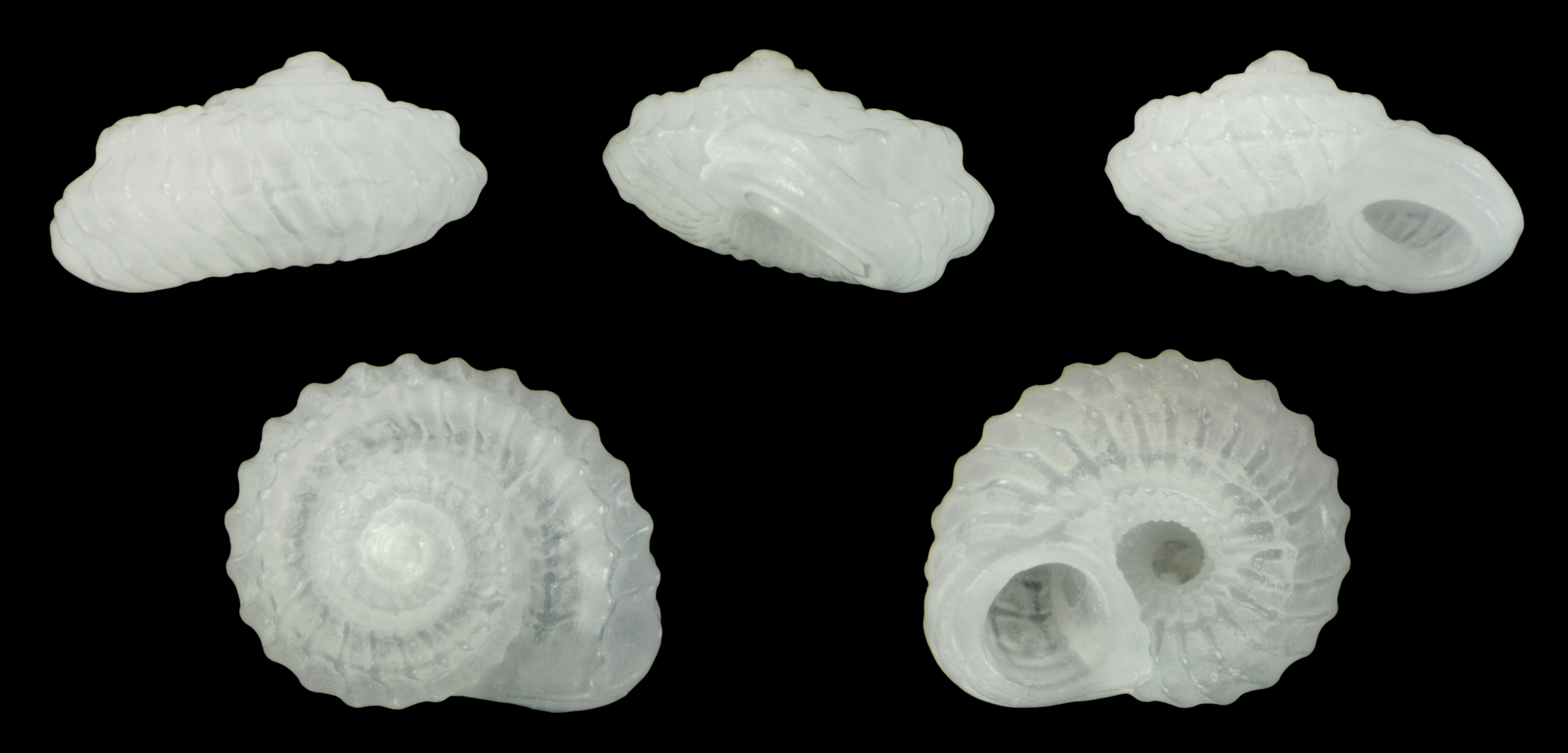
- Pseudoliotia pulchella (Dunker, 1860)

Scientific classification
- Kingdom: Animalia
- Phylum: Mollusca
- Class: Gastropoda
- Subclass: Caenogastropoda
- Order: Littorinimorpha
- Superfamily: Truncatelloidea
- Family: Tornidae
- Genus: Pseudoliotia; Tate, 1898

Type species
- Cyclostrema micans A. Adams, 1850

Synonyms
- Discreliotia Laseron, 1958; Liochrysta Laseron, 1958

= Pseudoliotia =

Genus of gastropods

Pseudoliotia is a genus of sea snails, marine gastropod mollusks in the family Tornidae within the superfamily Truncatelloidea.

== Species ==
Species within the genus Pseudoliotia include:

- Pseudoliotia acidalia (Melvill & Standen, 1899)
- Pseudoliotia anaglypta (A. Adams, 1863)
- Pseudoliotia asteriscus (Gould, 1859)
- Pseudoliotia axialis Laseron, 1958
- Pseudoliotia bellatula (W.-M. Feng, 1996)
- Pseudoliotia caelata (Garrett, 1873)
- Pseudoliotia calliglypta (Melvill, 1891)
- Pseudoliotia coronata Rubio & Rolán, 2018
- Pseudoliotia cristata (G. B. Sowerby III, 1900)
- Pseudoliotia dispersa Rubio & Rolán, 2018
- Pseudoliotia distincta Rubio & Rolán, 2018
- Pseudoliotia faceta Rubio & Rolán, 2018
- Pseudoliotia fijiensis Rubio & Rolán, 2018
- Pseudoliotia gabrielruedai Rubio & Rolán, 2018
- Pseudoliotia godeti (Dautzenberg & H. Fischer, 1907)
- Pseudoliotia gowllandi (Brazier, 1874)
- Pseudoliotia granulosa Kuroda & Habe, 1971
- Pseudoliotia hattenbergeri Rolán & Rubio, 2002
- Pseudoliotia henjamensis (Melvill & Standen, 1903)
- Pseudoliotia inanis Rubio & Rolán, 2018
- Pseudoliotia indicta Rubio & Rolán, 2018
- Pseudoliotia intermixta Rubio & Rolán, 2018
- Pseudoliotia linguifera (Thiele, 1925)
- Pseudoliotia micans (A. Adams, 1850)
- Pseudoliotia minor Rubio & Rolán, 2018
- † Pseudoliotia motobuensis MacNeil, 1961
- Pseudoliotia nodenim Rubio & Rolán, 2018
- Pseudoliotia nodosa Rubio & Rolán, 2018
- Pseudoliotia ocrinium (Melvill & Standen, 1901)
- Pseudoliotia oscostata Rubio & Rolán, 2018
- Pseudoliotia philippinensis Rubio & Rolán, 2018
- Pseudoliotia philtata (Hedley, 1900)
- Pseudoliotia plurifunis Rubio & Rolán, 2018
- Pseudoliotia plusnodosa Rubio & Rolán, 2018
- Pseudoliotia pressa Rubio & Rolán, 2018
- Pseudoliotia profundi Rubio & Rolán, 2018
- Pseudoliotia pulchella (Dunker, 1860)
- Pseudoliotia radians (Laseron, 1958)
- Pseudoliotia reeviana (Hinds, 1843)
- Pseudoliotia rudispiralis Rubio & Rolán, 2018
- Pseudoliotia salva Rubio & Rolán, 2018
- Pseudoliotia sementis Rubio & Rolán, 2018
- Pseudoliotia seposita Rubio & Rolán, 2018
- Pseudoliotia speciosa (Angas, 1871)
- Pseudoliotia supremum (Melvill & Standen, 1903)
- Pseudoliotia teresae Rubio & Rolán, 2018
- Pseudoliotia tribulationis (Hedley, 1909)
- Pseudoliotia tropica Laseron, 1958
- Pseudoliotia supremum (Melvill & Standen, 1903)
- Pseudoliotia teresae Rubio & Rolán, 2018
- Pseudoliotia tribulationis (Hedley, 1909)
- Pseudoliotia tropica Laseron, 1958
- Pseudoliotia vicina Rubio & Rolán, 2018

Species brought into synonymy

- Pseudoliotia imperforata Suter, 1908: synonym of Argalista imperforata (Suter, 1908)
- Pseudoliotia liliputia Laseron, 1958: synonym of Pseudoliotia speciosa (Angas, 1871)
