= Pseudoliotia bellatula =

Scientific classification
- Kingdom: Animalia
- Phylum: Mollusca
- Class: Gastropoda
- Subclass: Caenogastropoda
- Order: Littorinimorpha
- Superfamily: Truncatelloidea
- Family: Tornidae
- Genus: Pseudoliotia
- Species: P. bellatula

Binomial name
- Pseudoliotia bellatula (W. M. Feng, 1996)

Synonyms
- Circlotoma bellatula W.-M. Feng, 1996 (original combination)

Species of gastropod

Pseudoliotia bellatula is a species of sea snail, a marine gastropod mollusk in the family Tornidae.

== Distribution ==
This species occurs in the South China Sea.
