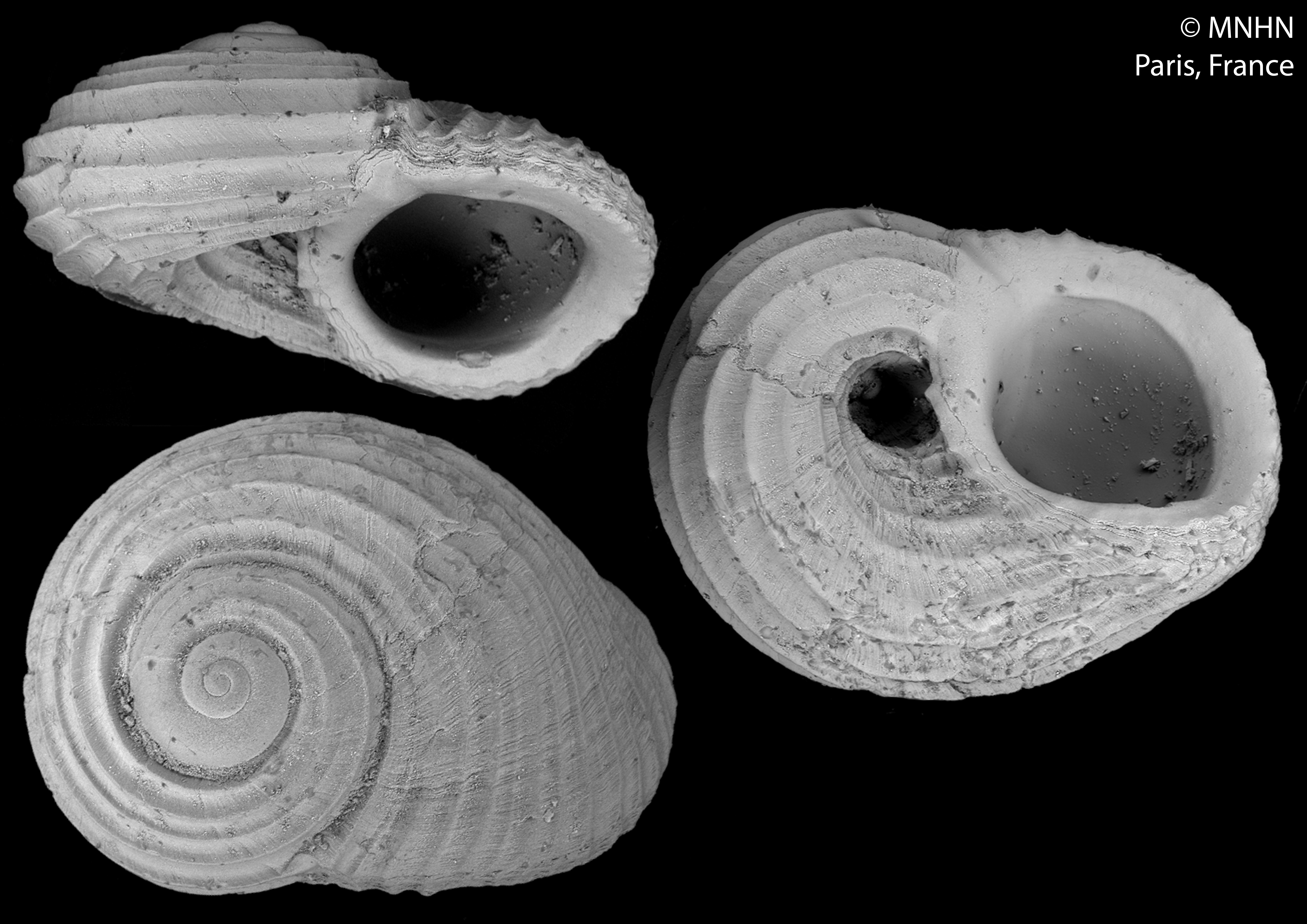
- Shell of Uzumakiella solomonensis (holotype at MNHN, Paris)

Scientific classification
- Kingdom: Animalia
- Phylum: Mollusca
- Class: Gastropoda
- Subclass: Caenogastropoda
- Order: Littorinimorpha
- Superfamily: Truncatelloidea
- Family: Tornidae
- Genus: Uzumakiella; Habe, 1958

Type species
- Uzumakiella japonica Habe, 1958

Synonyms
- Uzamakiella [sic] (misspelling)

= Uzumakiella =

Genus of gastropods

Uzumakiella is a genus of sea snails, marine gastropod mollusks in the family Tornidae.

== Species ==
- Uzumakiella japonica Habe, 1958
- Uzumakiella natalensis Kilburn, 1977
- Uzumakiella solomonensis Rubio & Rolán, 2018
