= Pseudoliotia acidalia =

Scientific classification
- Kingdom: Animalia
- Phylum: Mollusca
- Class: Gastropoda
- Subclass: Caenogastropoda
- Order: Littorinimorpha
- Family: Tornidae
- Genus: Pseudoliotia
- Species: P. acidalia

Binomial name
- Pseudoliotia acidalia (Melvill & Standen, 1899)

Synonyms
- Liochrysta acidula (Melvill & Standen) [sic]; Microtheca acidalia Melvill & Standen, 1907

Species of gastropod

Pseudoliotia acidalia is a species of small sea snail, a marine gastropod mollusk, in the family Tornidae.

== Distribution ==
This marine species occurs off Queensland and the Northern Territories, Australia.
