= Elachorbis diaphana =

Scientific classification
- Kingdom: Animalia
- Phylum: Mollusca
- Class: Gastropoda
- Subclass: Caenogastropoda
- Order: Littorinimorpha
- Family: Tornidae
- Genus: Elachorbis
- Species: E. diaphana

Binomial name
- Elachorbis diaphana Finlay, 1924

Species of gastropod

Elachorbis diaphana is a minute sea snail, a marine gastropod mollusc in the family Tornidae. This species is only known to occur in the area of the Foveaux Strait, New Zealand.
