= Spirostyliferina wareni =

Scientific classification
- Kingdom: Animalia
- Phylum: Mollusca
- Class: Gastropoda
- Subclass: Caenogastropoda
- Order: Littorinimorpha
- Family: Spirostyliferinidae
- Genus: Spirostyliferina
- Species: S. wareni

Binomial name
- Spirostyliferina wareni (Moolenbeek, 2009)

Synonyms
- Hoenselaaria wareni Moolenbeek, 2009 (original combination)

Species of gastropod

Spirostyliferina wareni is a species of sea snail, a marine gastropod mollusk in the family Spirostyliferinidae.
