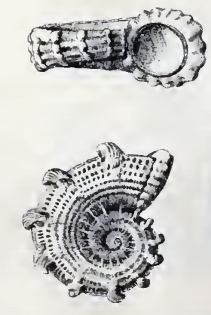
- Original drawing with two views of a shell of Pseudoliotia henjamensis

Scientific classification
- Kingdom: Animalia
- Phylum: Mollusca
- Class: Gastropoda
- Subclass: Caenogastropoda
- Order: Littorinimorpha
- Family: Tornidae
- Genus: Pseudoliotia
- Species: P. henjamensis

Binomial name
- Pseudoliotia henjamensis (Melvill & Standen), 1903

Synonyms
- Cyclostrema henjamense Melvill & Standen, 1903

= Pseudoliotia henjamensis =

Species of gastropod

Pseudoliotia henjamensis is a species of sea snail, a marine gastropod mollusk in the family Tornidae.

== Distribution ==
This species occurs in the Red Sea.
