= Spirostyliferina lizardensis =

Scientific classification
- Kingdom: Animalia
- Phylum: Mollusca
- Class: Gastropoda
- Subclass: Caenogastropoda
- Order: Littorinimorpha
- Family: Spirostyliferinidae
- Genus: Spirostyliferina
- Species: S. lizardensis

Binomial name
- Spirostyliferina lizardensis Bandel, 2006

Species of gastropod

Spirostyliferina lizardensis is a species of sea snail, a marine gastropod mollusk in the family Litiopidae.

The specific name lizardensis is according to the Lizard Island, its type locality.

== Distribution ==
Distribution of Spirostyliferina lizardensis includes Lizard Island, Great Barrier Reef, Australia.

== Description ==
The height of the shell is about 0.9 mm (0.035 in).
