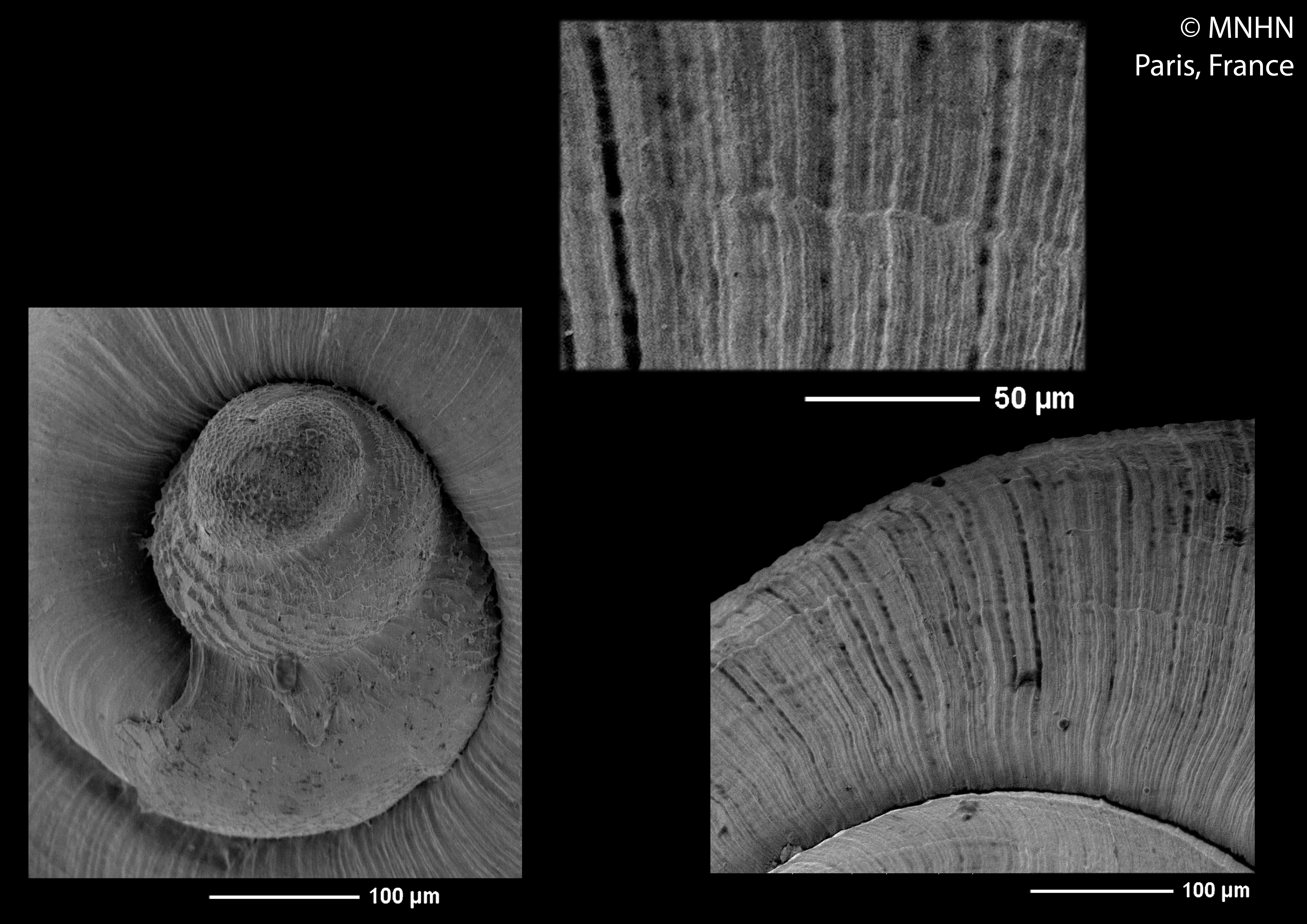
- Shell of Neusas distorta (holotype at MNHN, Paris)

Scientific classification
- Kingdom: Animalia
- Phylum: Mollusca
- Class: Gastropoda
- Subclass: Caenogastropoda
- Order: Littorinimorpha
- Superfamily: Truncatelloidea
- Family: Tornidae
- Genus: Neusas; Warén & Bouchet, 2001

Type species
- Homalogyra marshalli Sykes, 1925

= Neusas =

Genus of gastropods

Neusas is a genus of sea snails, marine gastropod mollusks in the family Tornidae within the superfamily Truncatelloidea.

The systematic position of this genus is uncertain. It is probably not in Tornidae.

== Species ==
- Neusas brooksi Fernández-Garcés, Rubio & Rolán, 2018
- Neusas distorta Rubio & Rolán, 2018
- Neusas inesae Rubio & Rolán, 2018
- Neusas juliae Rubio & Rolán, 2018
- Neusas marshalli (Sykes, 1925)
