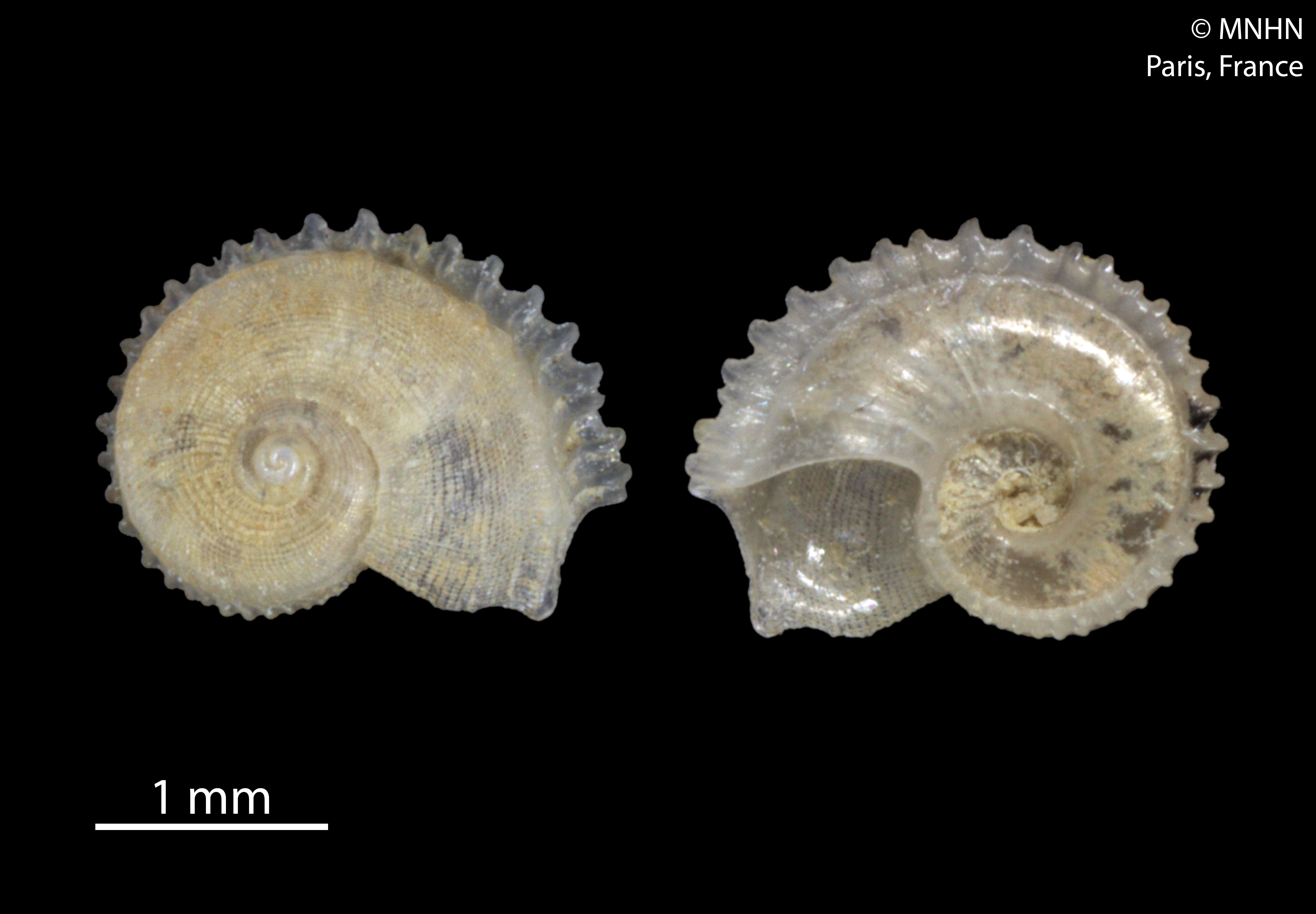
- Shell of Anticlimax cyclist (specimen at MNHN, Paris)

Scientific classification
- Kingdom: Animalia
- Phylum: Mollusca
- Class: Gastropoda
- Subclass: Caenogastropoda
- Order: Littorinimorpha
- Superfamily: Truncatelloidea
- Family: Tornidae
- Genus: Anticlimax; Pilsbry & McGinty, 1946

Type species
- † Teinostoma calliglyptum Dall, 1903

Synonyms
- Anticlimax (Subclimax) Pilsbry & Olsson, 1950 · accepted, alternate representation; Canimarina Aguayo & Borro, 1946; Climacia Dall, 1903 (Invalid: junior homonym of Climacia M'Lachlan, 1869 [Neuroptera]; Climacina and Anticlimax are replacement names); Climacina Aguayo & Borro, 1946 (Invalid: junior homonym of Climacina Gemmellaro, 1878; Anticlimax is a replacement name); Lioprora Laseron, 1958

= Anticlimax (gastropod) =

Genus of gastropods

Anticlimax is a genus of sea snails, marine gastropod mollusks in the family Tornidae within the superfamily Truncatelloidea.

== Species ==
Species within the genus Anticlimax include:

- Anticlimax aitormonzoni Rubio & Rolán, 2014
- Anticlimax annae Pilsbry & Olsson, 1950
- Anticlimax athleenae (Pilsbry & McGinty, 1946)
- Anticlimax bicarinata Rubio & Rolán, 2014
- Anticlimax bicornis Rubio & Rolán, 2014
- Anticlimax boucheti Rubio & Rolán, 2014
- Anticlimax crassilabris (Aguayo & Borro, 1946)
- Anticlimax cyclist Rubio & Rolán, 2014
- † Anticlimax dalli (Cossmann, 1918)
- Anticlimax decorata Rolán, Fernández-Garcés & Rubio, 1997
- Anticlimax dentata Rubio & Rolán, 2014
- Anticlimax elata Rubio & Rolán, 2014
- Anticlimax fastigata Rubio & Rolán, 2014
- Anticlimax faviformis Rubio & Rolán, 2014
- Anticlimax fecunda Rubio & Rolán, 2014
- Anticlimax fijiensis Rubio & Rolán, 2014
- Anticlimax glabra Rubio, Rolán & Pelorce, 2011
- Anticlimax globulus Rubio & Rolán, 2014
- † Anticlimax hispaniolensis Pilsbry & Olsson, 1950
- Anticlimax imitatrix Rubio & Rolán, 2014
- Anticlimax infaceta Rubio & Rolán, 2014
- Anticlimax juanae Rubio & Rolán, 2014
- Anticlimax lentiformis Rubio & Rolán, 2014
- Anticlimax levis Rubio & Rolán, 2014
- Anticlimax locklini Pilsbry & Olsson, 1950
- Anticlimax maestratii Rubio & Rolán, 2014
- Anticlimax maranii Rubio & Rolán, 2014
- Anticlimax niasensis (Thiele, 1925)
- Anticlimax obesa Rubio & Rolán, 2014
- Anticlimax occidens Pilsbry & Olsson, 1952
- Anticlimax padangensis (Thiele, 1925)
- Anticlimax philippinensis Rubio & Rolán, 2014
- Anticlimax philsmithi Rubio & Rolán, 2014
- Anticlimax pilsbryi (McGinty, 1945)
- Anticlimax proboscidea (Aguayo, 1949)
- Anticlimax puncticulata Rubio & Rolán, 2014
- Anticlimax reinaudi Rubio & Rolán, 2014
- Anticlimax rhinoceros Rubio & Rolán, 2014
- Anticlimax robusta Rubio & Rolán, 2014
- Anticlimax rostrata (Hedley, 1900)
- Anticlimax salustianomatoi Rubio & Rolán, 2018
- Anticlimax schumoi (Vanatta, 1913)
- Anticlimax senenbarroi Rubio & Rolán, 2018
- Anticlimax serrata Rubio & Rolán, 2014
- Anticlimax simplex Rubio & Rolán, 2014
- Anticlimax simplicissima Rubio & Rolán, 2014
- Anticlimax simulans Rubio & Rolán, 2014
- Anticlimax singularis Rubio & Rolán, 2014
- Anticlimax solomonensis Rubio & Rolán, 2014
- Anticlimax spiralis Rubio & Rolán, 2014
- Anticlimax tamarae Rubio & Rolán, 2014
- Anticlimax tentorii Rubio & Rolán, 2014
- Anticlimax textilis Rubio & Rolán, 2014
- Anticlimax umbiliglabra Rubio & Rolán, 2014
- Anticlimax uniformis Rubio & Rolán, 2014
- Anticlimax vanuatuensis Rubio & Rolán, 2014
- Anticlimax virginiae Rubio & Rolán, 2014
- Anticlimax willetti Hertlein & Strong, 1951

Species brought into synonymy

- Anticlimax (Subclimax) Pilsbry & Olsson, 1950: synonym of Anticlimax Pilsbry & McGinty, 1946 (alternate representation)
- † Anticlimax (Subclimax) hispaniolensis Pilsbry & Olsson, 1950: synonym of † Anticlimax hispaniolensis Pilsbry & Olsson, 1950
