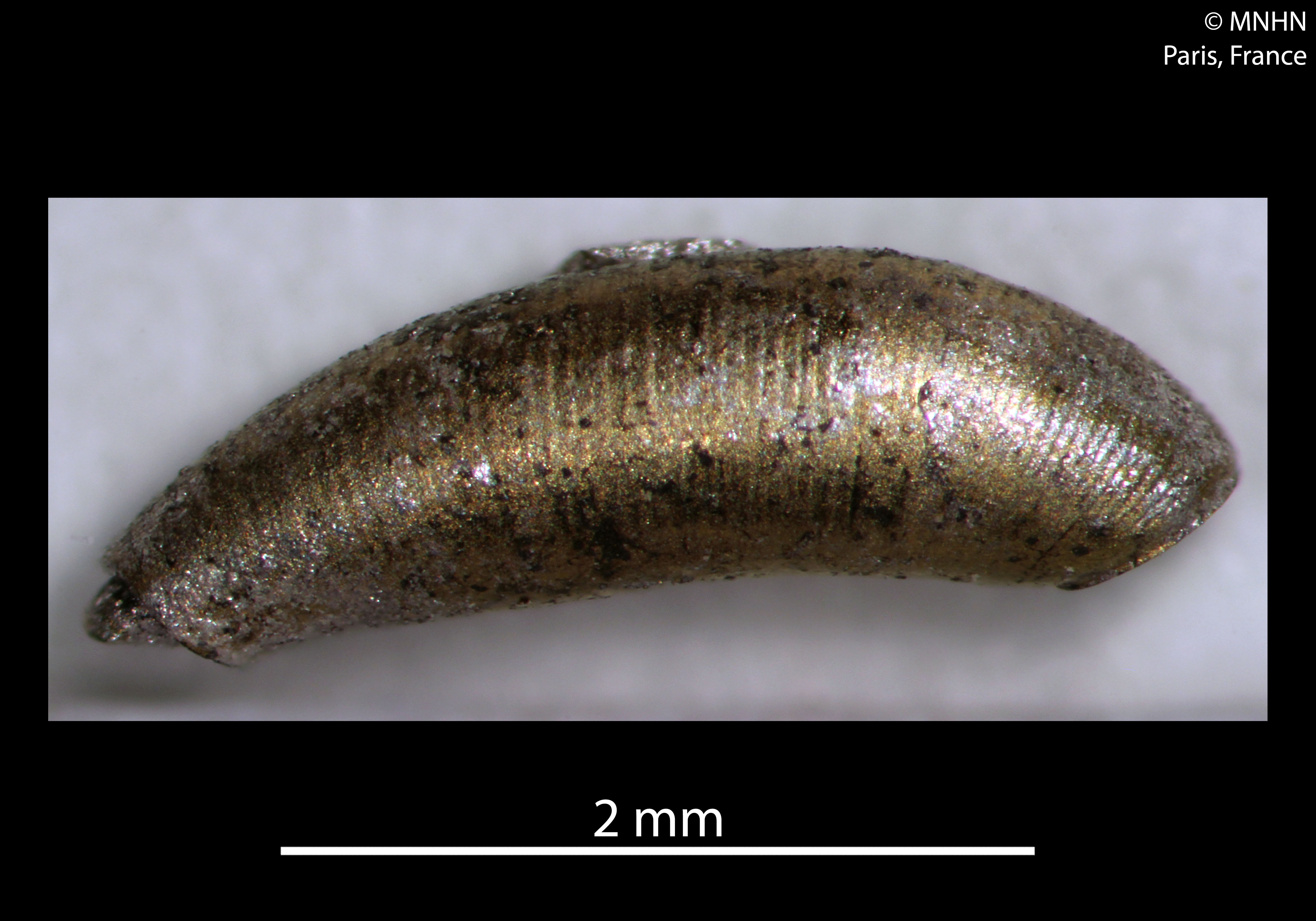
- Shell of Mauroceras kajiyamai (specimen at MNHN, Paris)

Scientific classification
- Kingdom: Animalia
- Phylum: Mollusca
- Class: Gastropoda
- Subclass: Caenogastropoda
- Order: Littorinimorpha
- Superfamily: Truncatelloidea
- Family: Caecidae
- Genus: Mauroceras; Vannozzi, 2019

Type species
- Meioceras kajiyamai Habe, 1963

= Mauroceras =

Genus of gastropods

Mauroceras is a genus of minute sea snails, marine gastropod mollusks or micromollusks in the family Caecidae.

== Species ==
- Mauroceras amamiense (Habe, 1978)
- Mauroceras boucheti (Pizzini & Raines, 2011)
- Mauroceras kajiyamai (Habe, 1963)
- Mauroceras legumen (Hedley, 1899)
- Mauroceras maestratii (Pizzini, Raines & Vannozzi, 2013)
- Mauroceras rhinoceros (Pizzini, Raines & Vannozzi, 2013)
- Mauroceras sandwichense (de Folin, 1881)
- Mauroceras serratum (Vannozzi, 2017)
