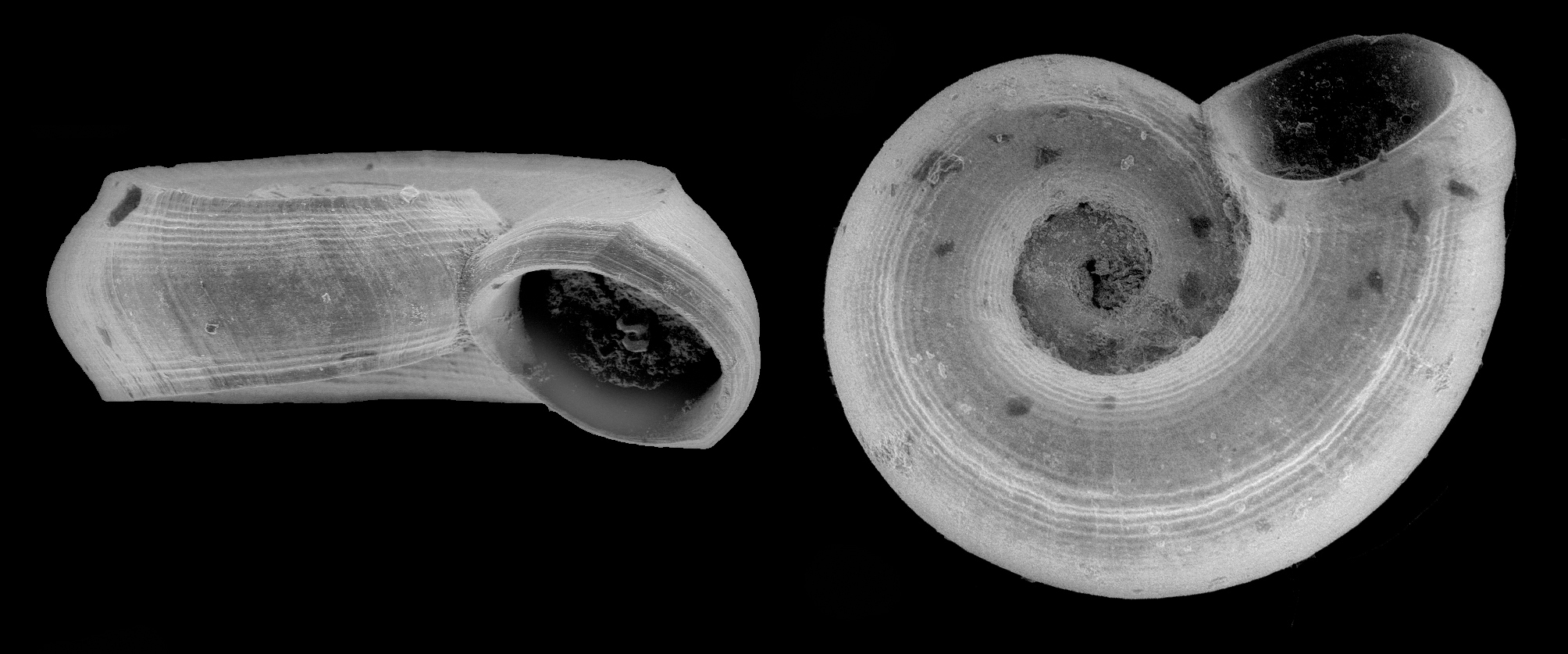
- Shell of Clenchiella abatanriver (paratype at MNHN, Paris)

Scientific classification
- Kingdom: Animalia
- Phylum: Mollusca
- Class: Gastropoda
- Subclass: Caenogastropoda
- Order: Littorinimorpha
- Superfamily: Truncatelloidea
- Family: Clenchiellidae
- Genus: Clenchiella; Abbott, 1948

Type species
- Clenchiella victoriae Abbott, 1948

= Clenchiella =

Genus of sea snails

Clenchiella is a genus of sea snails, marine gastropod molluscs in the family Clenchiellidae.

== Species ==
- Clenchiella abatanriver Rubio & Rolán, 2020
- Clenchiella bicingulata Ponder, H. Fukuda & Hallan, 2014
- Clenchiella iriomotensis Ponder, H. Fukuda & Hallan, 2014
- Clenchiella minutissima (Wattebled, 1884)
- Clenchiella varicosa Ponder, H. Fukuda & Hallan, 2014
- Clenchiella victoriae Abbott, 1948

Species brought into synonymy

- Clenchiella papuensis van Benthem Jutting, 1963: synonym of Clenchiella minutissima (Wattebled, 1884)
- Clenchiella sentaniensis van Benthem Jutting, 1963: synonym of Coleglabra sentaniensis (van Benthem Jutting, 1963) (original combination)
