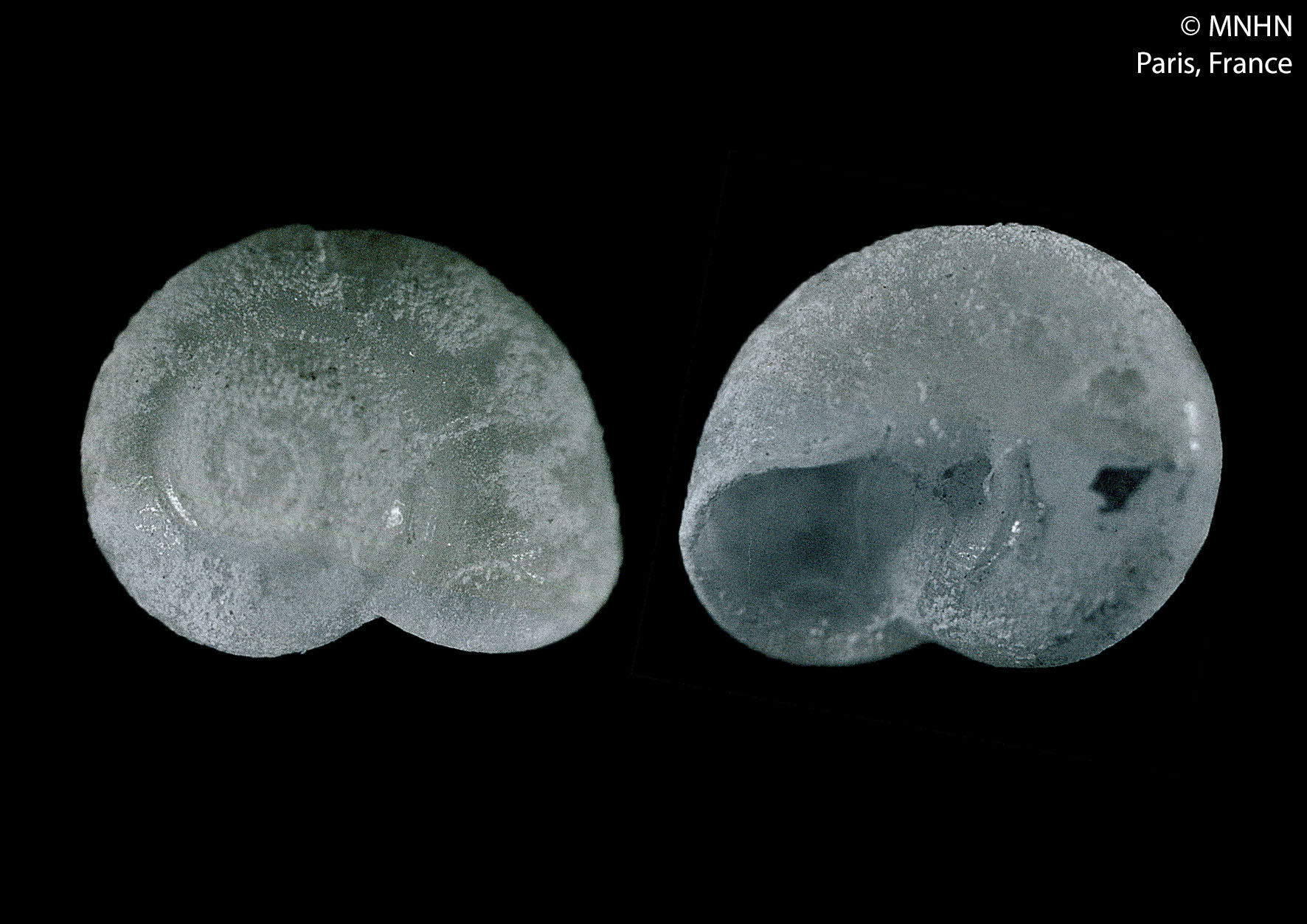
- Shell of Solariorbis petitii (syntype at MNHN, Paris)

Scientific classification
- Kingdom: Animalia
- Phylum: Mollusca
- Class: Gastropoda
- Subclass: Caenogastropoda
- Order: Littorinimorpha
- Superfamily: Truncatelloidea
- Family: Tornidae
- Genus: Solariorbis; Conrad, 1865

Type species
- † Delphinula depressa I. Lea, 1833

Synonyms
- Solariorbis (Eulerema) Pilsbry & Olsson, 1952 · alternate representation; Teinostoma (Solariorbis) Conrad, 1865; Vitrinella (Solariorbis) Conrad, 1865; Vitrinella (Striovitrinella) Olsson & McGinty, 1958

= Solariorbis =

Genus of gastropods

Solariorbis is a genus of gastropods belonging to the family Tornidae.

== Species ==
- Solariorbis allomphalus Pilsbry & Olsson, 1952
- Solariorbis ametabolus Pilsbry & Olsson, 1952
- Solariorbis annulatus (Carpenter, 1857)
- Solariorbis antillensis De Jong & Coomans, 1988
- Solariorbis arnoldi Bartsch, 1927
- Solariorbis bailyanus Pilsbry & Olsson, 1952
- Solariorbis bakeri (A. M. Strong & Hertlein, 1939)
- Solariorbis bartschi (Vanatta, 1913)
- Solariorbis blakei (Rehder, 1944)
- Solariorbis callusa (Laseron, 1958)
- Solariorbis carianus Pilsbry & Olsson, 1952
- Solariorbis carinatus (Carpenter, 1857)
- Solariorbis carinulatus (Carpenter, 1857)
- Solariorbis concinnus (C. B. Adams, 1852)
- † Solariorbis decussatus (F. Sandberger, 1859)
- † Solariorbis depressus (I. Lea, 1833) †
- Solariorbis ditropis Pilsbry & Olsson, 1952
- Solariorbis elegans Pilsbry & Olsson, 1952
- Solariorbis elegans (Olsson & McGinty, 1958)
- † Solariorbis eugenes Pilsbry, 1953
- Solariorbis exquisitus Pilsbry & Olsson, 1952
- Solariorbis gibraleonis Pilsbry & Olsson, 1952
- Solariorbis guianensis van Regteren Altena, 1966
- Solariorbis hambachi (A. M. Strong & Hertlein, 1939)
- Solariorbis hannai (A. M. Strong & Hertlein, 1939)
- Solariorbis hondurasensis (Vanatta, 1913)
- Solariorbis hypolius Pilsbry & Olsson, 1952
- Solariorbis infracarinatus (Gabb, 1881)
- Solariorbis lineopunctatus Rubio, Fernández-Garcés & Rolán, 2011
- Solariorbis liriope (Bartsch, 1911)
- Solariorbis miguelensis Pilsbry & Olsson, 1952
- Solariorbis millepunctatus (Pilsbry & Olsson, 1945)
- Solariorbis minutus (C. B. Adams, 1852)
- Solariorbis mooreanus (Vanatta, 1904)
- Solariorbis multistriatus (A. E. Verrill, 1884)
- Solariorbis narinensis Pilsbry & Olsson, 1952
- † Solariorbis oostrombusensis Lozouet, 2015
- Solariorbis pachyston (Verco, 1907)
- Solariorbis pacificus Pilsbry & Olsson, 1952
- Solariorbis pellucidus Pilsbry & Olsson, 1952
- Solariorbis petitii (P. Fischer, 1857)
- Solariorbis punctostriatus Rubio, Rolán & H. G. Lee, 2011
- Solariorbis pyricallosus (Carpenter, 1857)
- Solariorbis regularis (C. B. Adams, 1852)
- Solariorbis ruris Rubio, Fernández-Garcés & Rolán, 2011
- Solariorbis schumoi (Vanatta, 1913)
- Solariorbis seminudus (C. B. Adams, 1852)
- Solariorbis semipunctus D. R. Moore, 1965
- Solariorbis shimeri (Clapp, 1914)
- Solariorbis solidus Rubio, Fernández-Garcés & Rolán, 2011
- Solariorbis terminalis (Pilsbry & McGinty, 1946)
- Solariorbis truncatus (Gabb, 1881)
- † Solariorbis turoniensis (Glibert, 1949)

Synonyms

- Solariorbis aguayoi Corgan, 1968: synonym of Vitrinella aguayoi (Corgan, 1968) (original combination)
- Solariorbis basilissus Pilsbry, 1953 †: synonym of Solariorbis mooreanus (Vanatta, 1904)
- Solariorbis contractus (Vanatta, 1913): synonym of Vitrinella contracta (Vanatta, 1913)
- Solariorbis corylus Olsson & McGinty, 1958: synonym of Solariorbis truncatus (Gabb, 1881)
- Solariorbis decipiens Olsson & McGinty, 1958: synonym of Anticlimax crassilabris (Aguayo & Borro, 1946)
- Solariorbis euzonus Pilsbry & McGinty, 1950: synonym of Solariorbis infracarinatus (Gabb, 1881)
- Solariorbis funiculus (Dall, 1892): synonym of Vitrinella funiculus (Dall, 1892)
