= Elachorbis subtatei =

Scientific classification
- Kingdom: Animalia
- Phylum: Mollusca
- Class: Gastropoda
- Subclass: Caenogastropoda
- Order: Littorinimorpha
- Family: Tornidae
- Genus: Elachorbis
- Species: E. subtatei

Binomial name
- Elachorbis subtatei (Suter, 1907

Synonyms
- Cyclostrema subtatei Suter, 1907

Species of gastropod

Elachorbis subtatei is a minute sea snail, a marine gastropod mollusc in the family Tornidae. It is known only from New Zealand.
