= Pseudoliotia pulchella =

Scientific classification
- Kingdom: Animalia
- Phylum: Mollusca
- Class: Gastropoda
- Subclass: Caenogastropoda
- Order: Littorinimorpha
- Family: Tornidae
- Genus: Pseudoliotia
- Species: P. pulchella

Binomial name
- Pseudoliotia pulchella (Dunker, 1860)

Synonyms
- Cyclostrema bushae Dautzenberg & H. Fischer, 1907; Cyclostrema bushi Dautzenberg & H. Fischer, 1907; Cyclostrema pulchellum Dunker, 1860

Species of gastropod

Pseudoliotia pulchella is a species of sea snail, a marine gastropod mollusk in the family Liotiidae. Its original name, Cyclostrema bushae, was given for the American malacologist Katherine J. Bush (1855–1937) who had made a revision of Cyclostrema in 1897 It was reassigned to Pseudoliotia in 2018.

== Distribution ==
This marine species occurs off Madagascar.
