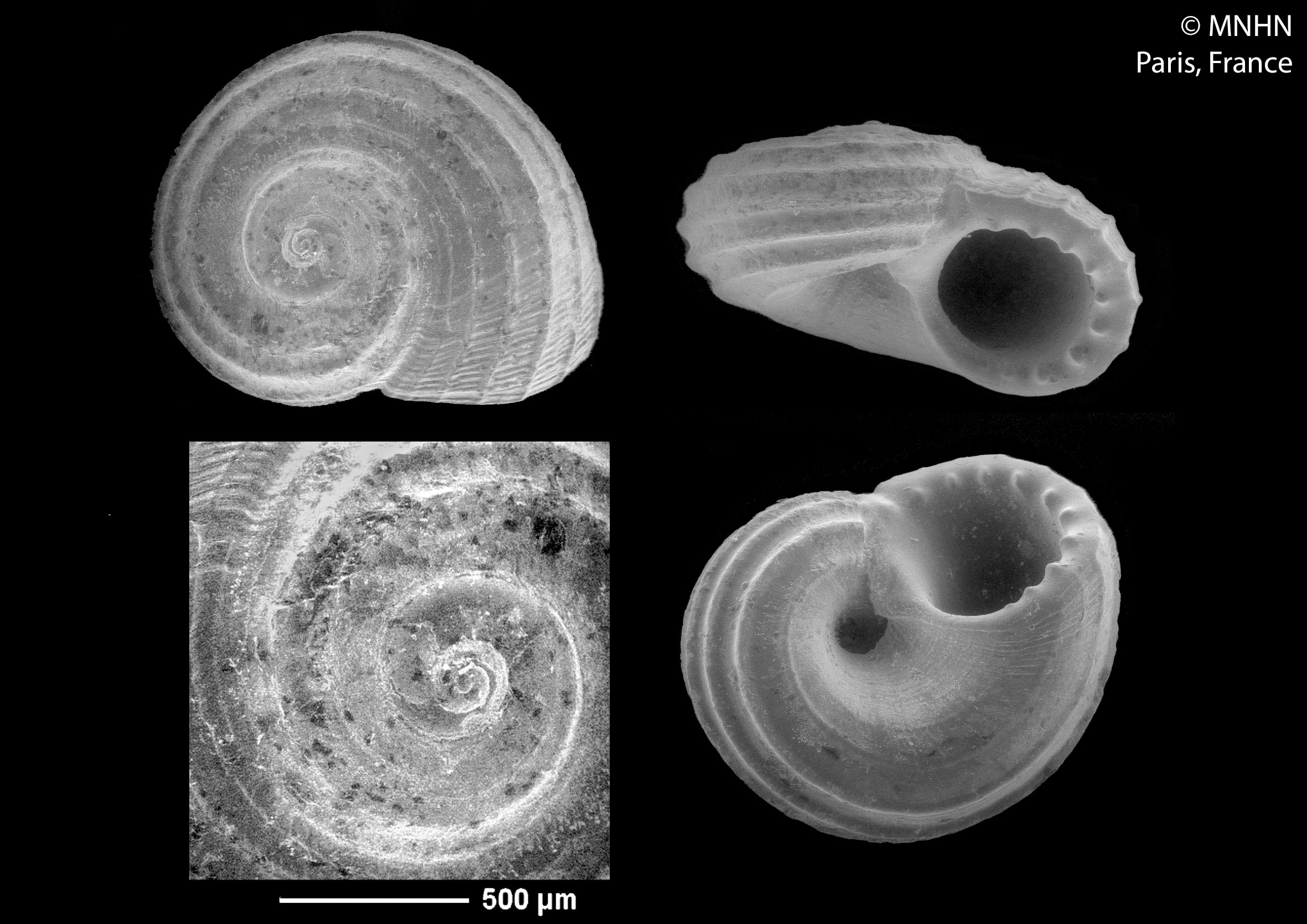
- Shell of Tuberes marianae (holotype at MNHN, Paris)

Scientific classification
- Kingdom: Animalia
- Phylum: Mollusca
- Class: Gastropoda
- Subclass: Caenogastropoda
- Order: Littorinimorpha
- Superfamily: Truncatelloidea
- Family: Tornidae
- Genus: Tuberes; Rubio & Rolán, 2017

Type species
- Tuberes solomonensis Rubio & Rolán, 2017

= Tuberes =

Genus of gastropods

Tuberes is a genus of sea snails, marine gastropod mollusks in the family Tornidae.

== Species ==
- Tuberes marianae Rubio & Rolán, 2017
- Tuberes minituber Rubio & Rolán, 2017
- Tuberes papuensis Rubio & Rolán, 2017
- Tuberes philippinensis Rubio & Rolán, 2017
- Tuberes postremus Rubio & Rolán, 2017
- Tuberes solomonensis Rubio & Rolán, 2017
- Tuberes tornatus (A. Adams, 1864)
- Tuberes vanuatuensis Rubio & Rolán, 2017
