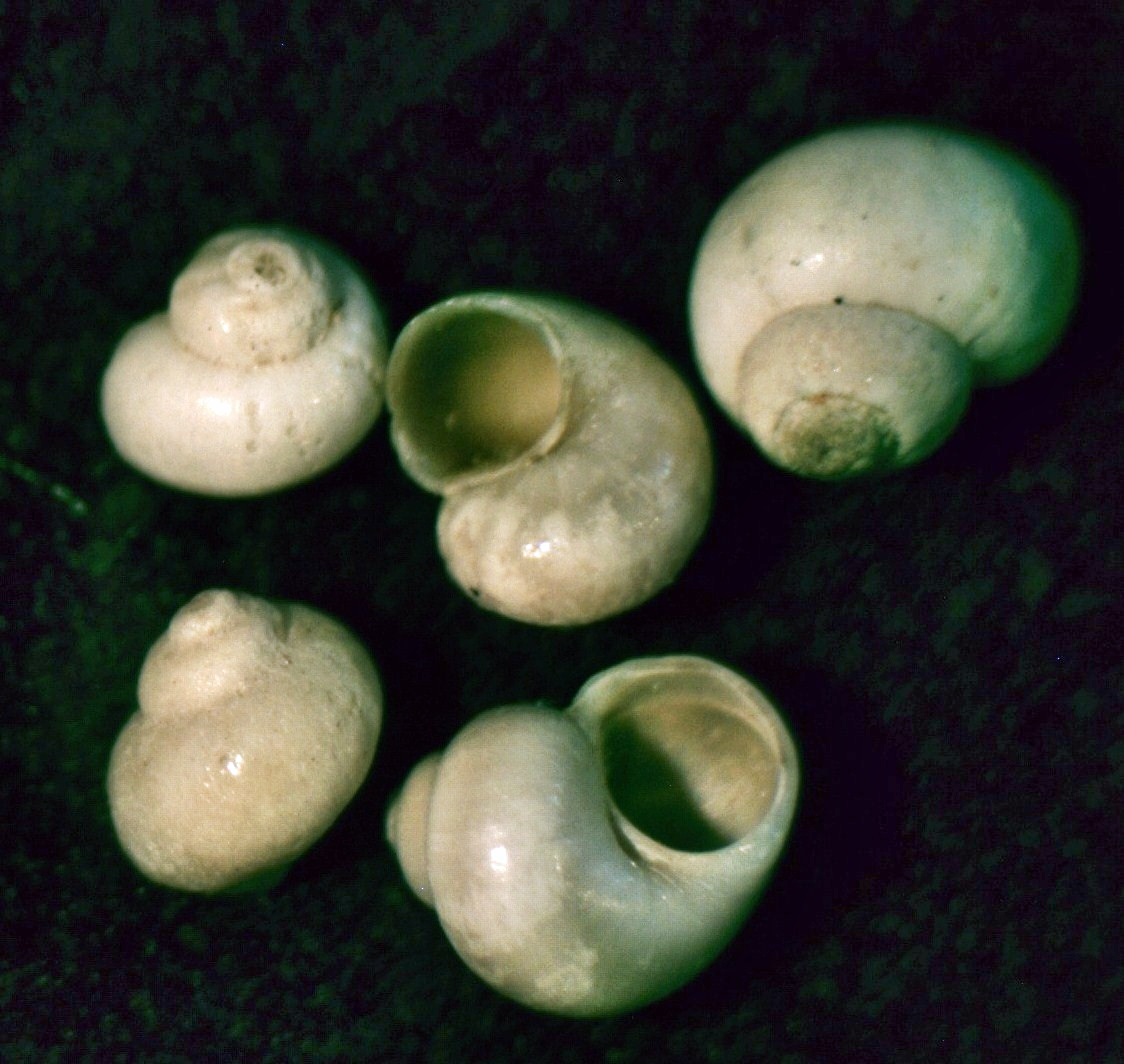
- Five shells of Hydrococcus brazieri

Scientific classification
- Kingdom: Animalia
- Phylum: Mollusca
- Class: Gastropoda
- Subclass: Caenogastropoda
- Order: Littorinimorpha
- Superfamily: Truncatelloidea
- Family: Hydrococcidae; Thiele, 1928

= Hydrococcidae =

Family of molluscs

Hydrococcidae is a family of small sea snails, marine gastropod molluscs in the clade Littorinimorpha.

== Genera ==
- Hydrococcus Thiele, 1928
  - Hydrococcus brazieri (J. E. Tennison-Woods, 1876) (synonyms : Assiminea brazieri, Ampullarina minuta Tenison Woods, 1877)
