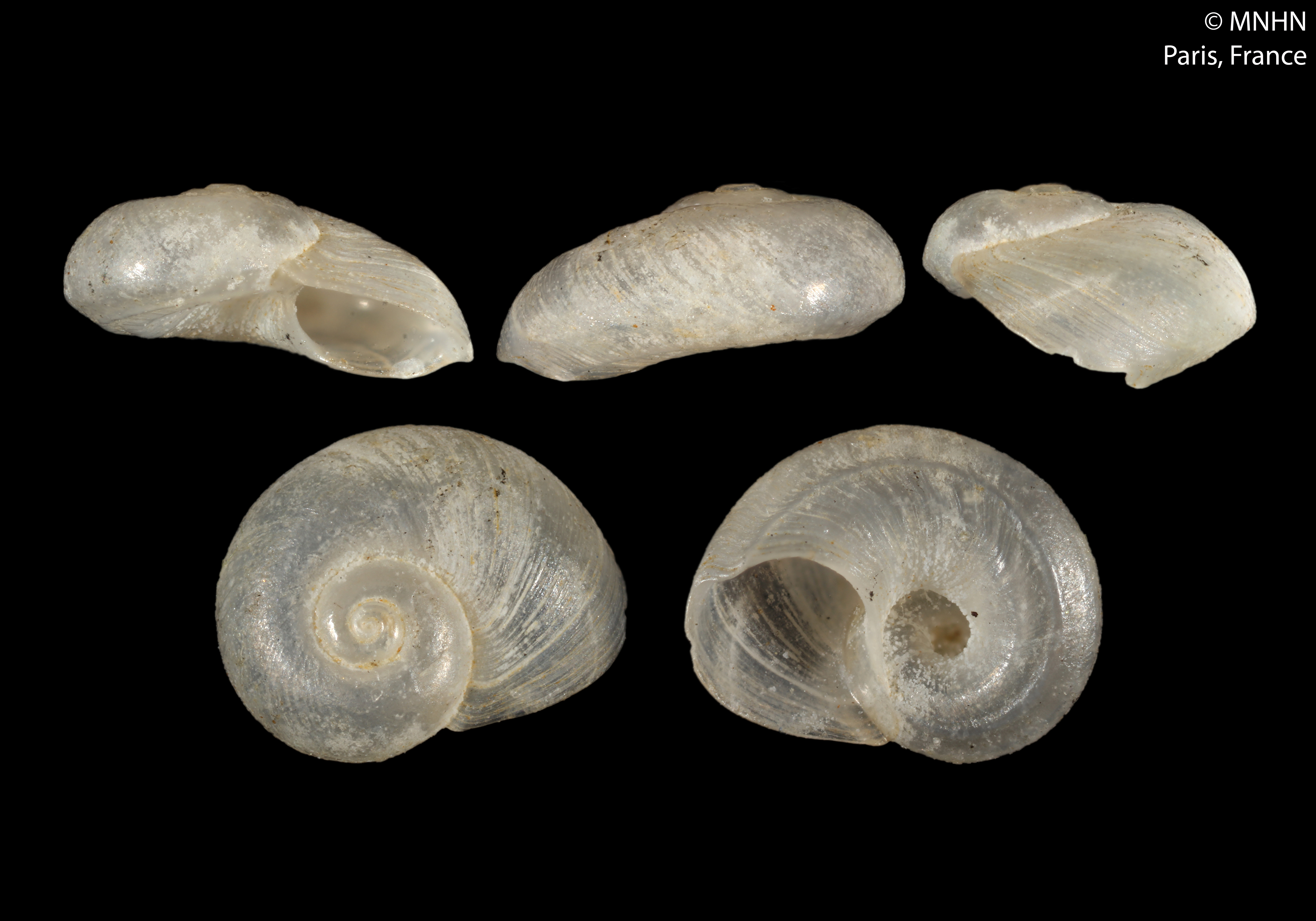
- Shells of Cochliolepis militaris (syntype at MNHN, Paris)

Scientific classification
- Kingdom: Animalia
- Phylum: Mollusca
- Class: Gastropoda
- Subclass: Caenogastropoda
- Order: Littorinimorpha
- Superfamily: Truncatelloidea
- Family: Tornidae
- Genus: Cochliolepis; Stimpson, 1858

Type species
- Cochliolepis parasitica Stimpson, 1858

= Cochliolepis =

Genus of gastropods

Cochliolepis is a genus of small sea snails, marine gastropod mollusks in the family Tornidae.

== Taxonomy ==
Rolán & Rubio (2002: 46) hold Discopsis as a valid genus, distinct from Cochliolepis Stimpson, 1858, on the grounds that the latter belongs in the family Vitrinellidae and the former in Tornidae. This should be reevaluated in the perspective that both families are considered synonyms. Adam & Knudsen (1969) may have been right in placing the West African species in Cochliolepis.

== Species ==
Species within the genus Cochliolepis include:

- Cochliolepis adamsii (P. Fischer, 1857)
- Cochliolepis albiceratus Ponder, 1966
- Cochliolepis catherinae Barnard, 1963
- † Cochliolepis differens Rubio, Rolán & Lee, 2011
- Cochliolepis holmesii (Dall, 1889)
- Cochliolepis militaris (Jousseaume, 1872)
- Cochliolepis nautiliformis (Holmes, 1859)
- Cochliolepis parasitica Stimpson, 1858
- Cochliolepis patricioi Rubio, Rolán & Lee, 2011
- Cochliolepis planispiralis Rubio, Fernández-Garcés & Rolán, 2011
- Cochliolepis planulata (G.B. Sowerby III, 1892)
- Cochliolepis striata Dall, 1889
- Cochliolepis surinamensis Van Regteren Altena, 1966
- Cochliolepis tugelae Barnard, 1963

Species brought into synonymy

- Cochliolepis albicerata Ponder, 1966 : synonym of Cochliolepis albiceratus Ponder, 1966
- Cochliolepis antarctica Numanami, 1996: synonym of Zerotula antarctica (Numanami, 1996)
- Cochliolepis costulatus (de Folin, 1870): synonym of Discopsis costulatus de Folin, 1870
- Cochliolepis dautzenbergi Adam & Knudsen, 1969: synonym of Discopsis dautzenbergi (Adam & Knudsen, 1969)
- Cochliolepis gruveli (Dautzenberg, 1912): synonym of Discopsis gruveli (Dautzenberg, 1912
- Cochliolepis jullieni Adam & Knudsen, 1969: synonym of Discopsis jullieni (Adam & Knudsen, 1969)
- Cochliolepis radians Rolán & Rubio, 1991: synonym of Discopsis radians (Rolán & Rubio, 1991)
- Cochliolepis reductus Rolán & Rubio, 1991: synonym of Discopsis reductus (Rolán & Rubio, 1991)
