= Falsicingulidae =

- Falsicingula kurilensis

Scientific classification
- Kingdom: Animalia
- Phylum: Mollusca
- Class: Gastropoda
- Subclass: Caenogastropoda
- Order: Littorinimorpha
- Superfamily: Truncatelloidea
- Family: Falsicingulidae; Slavoshevskaya, 1975

Genera
- See text

Family of gastropods

Falsicingulidae is a family of very small sea snails, marine gastropod molluscs in the clade Littorinimorpha.

== Genera ==
The only Genus within the family Falsicingulidae is:

- Falsicingula, the type genus

== Species ==
There are five accepted species within Falsicingula:

- Falsicingula aleutica (Dall, 1887)
- Falsicingula athera (Bartsch, 1967)
- Falsicingula kurilensis (Pilsbry, 1905)
- Falsicingula mundana (Yokoyama, 1926)
- Falsicingula ventricosior (Middendorff, 1851)

There are also three species that are now no longer accepted as being separate species:

- Falsicingula angustata (Pilsbry, 1901) now accepted to be Ansola angustata (Pilsbry, 1901)
- Falsicingula elegans (A. N. Golikov & Kussakin, 1967) now accepted to be Falsicingula mundana (Yokoyama, 1926)
- Falsicingula katherinae (Bartsch, 1911) now accepted to be Boreocingula martyni (Dall, 1886)
