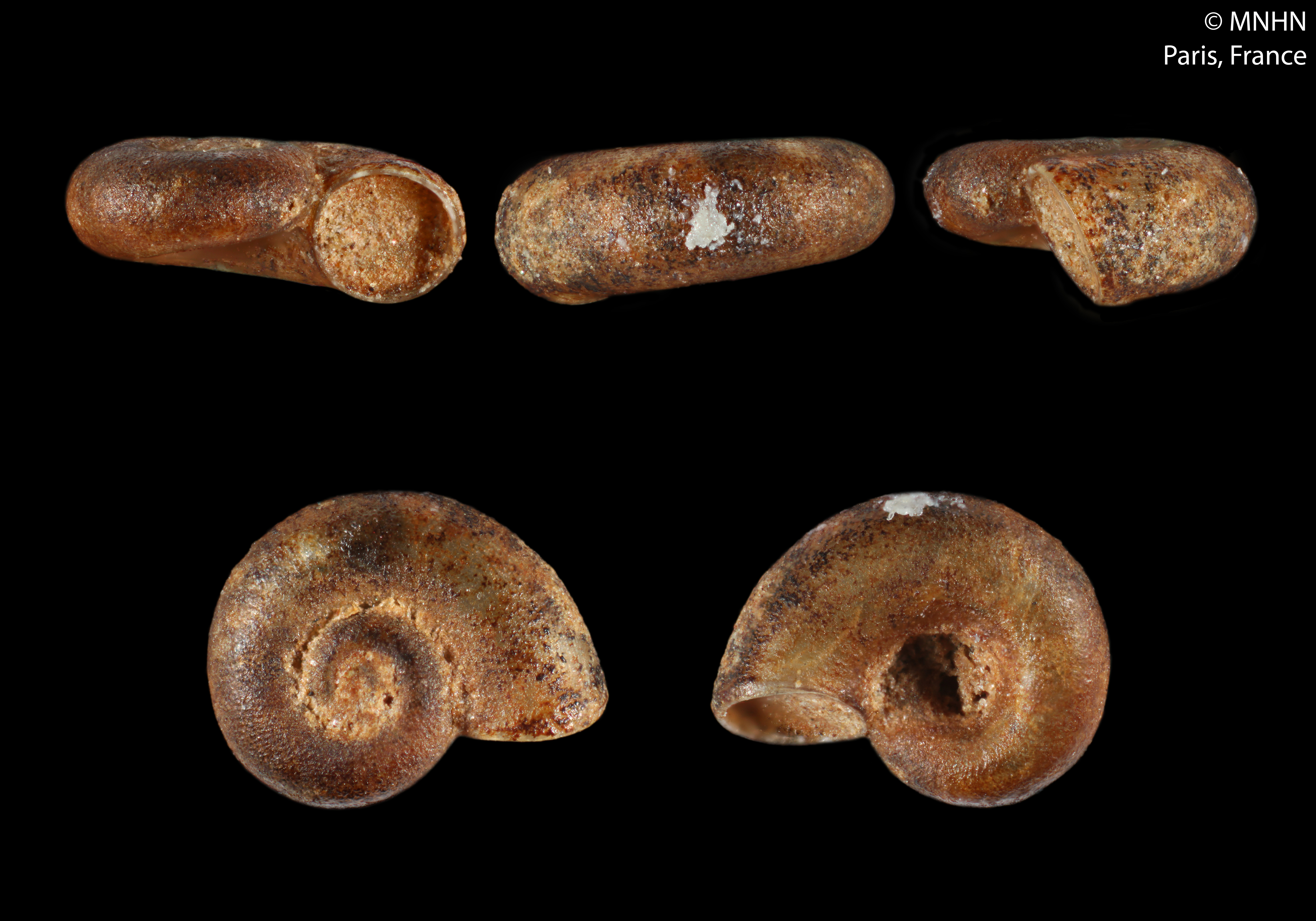
- Shell of Clenchiella minutissima (syntype at MNHN, Paris)

Scientific classification
- Kingdom: Animalia
- Phylum: Mollusca
- Class: Gastropoda
- Subclass: Caenogastropoda
- Order: Littorinimorpha
- Superfamily: Truncatelloidea
- Family: Clenchiellidae; D. W. Taylor, 1966

= Clenchiellidae =

Family of gastropods

Clenchiellidae is a family of sea snails, marine gastropod molluscs in the superfamily Truncatelloidea.

== Genera ==
- Clenchiella Abbott, 1948
- Coleglabra Ponder, H. Fukuda & Hallan, 2014
- Colenuda Ponder, H. Fukuda & Hallan, 2014
- Coliracemata Ponder, H. Fukuda & Hallan, 2014
