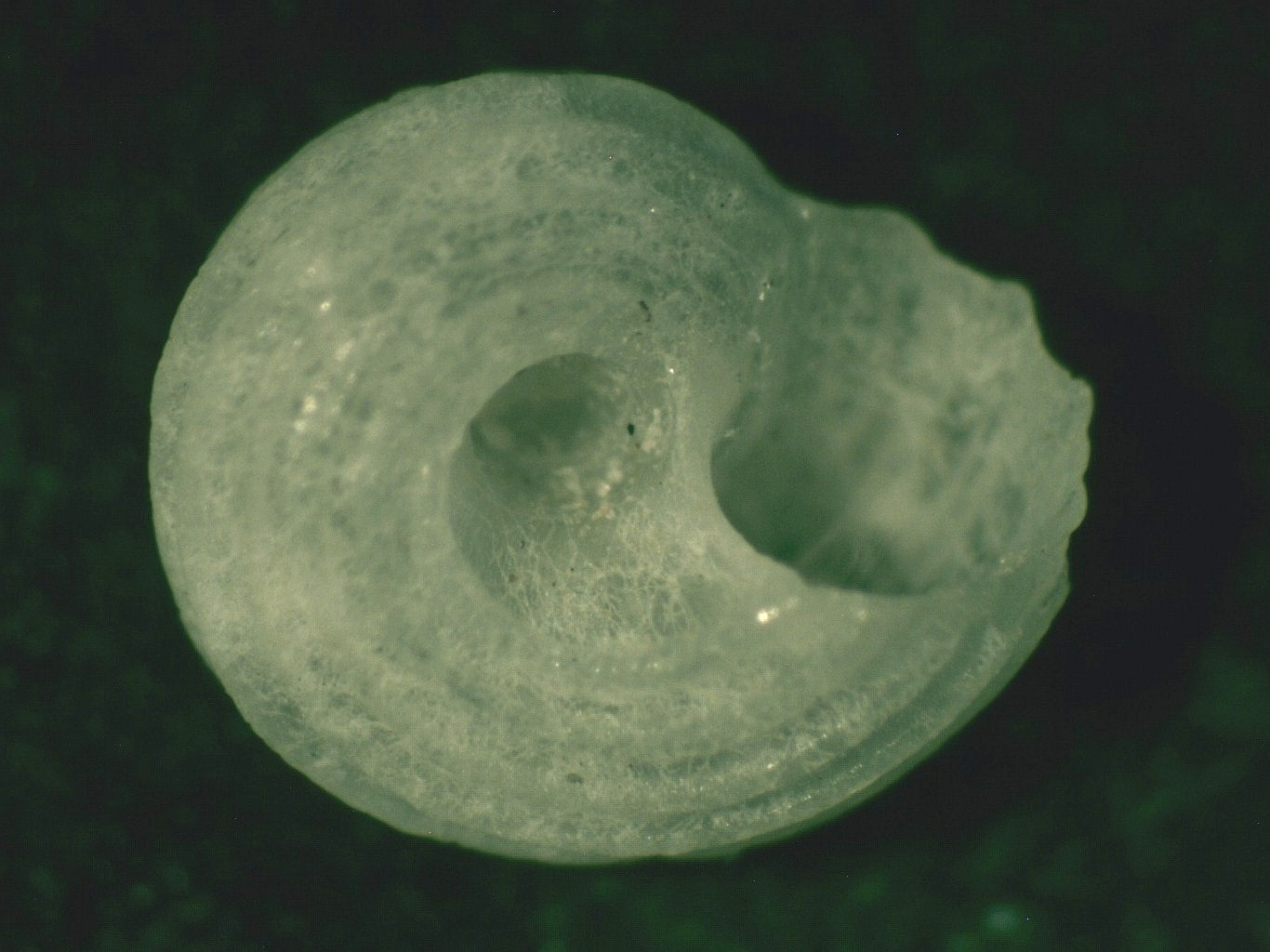
- Ventral view of a shell of Elachorbis tatei

Scientific classification
- Domain: Eukaryota
- Kingdom: Animalia
- Phylum: Mollusca
- Class: Gastropoda
- Subclass: Caenogastropoda
- Order: Littorinimorpha
- Family: Tornidae
- Genus: Elachorbis
- Species: E. tatei

Binomial name
- Elachorbis tatei (Angas, 1878)

Synonyms
- Cyclostrema tatei Angas, 1878; Circulus tatei (Angas, 1878)

= Elachorbis tatei =

Species of gastropod

Elachorbis tatei is a species of minute sea snail with an operculum, a marine gastropod mollusk in the family Tornidae.

== Distribution ==
This species can be found along the coast of Western Australia and South Australia in shallow waters and in depths up to 150 fathoms (or 275 m).

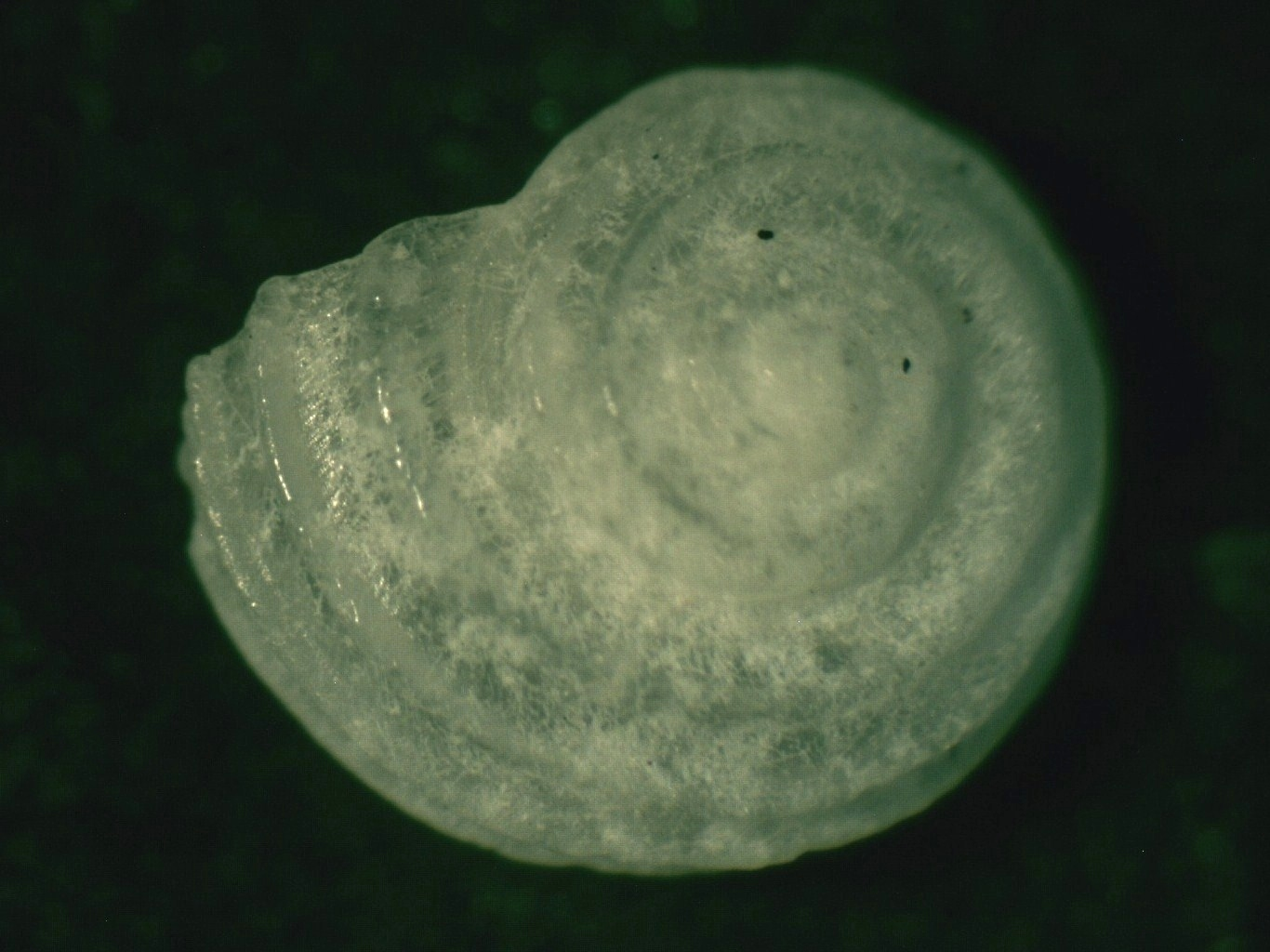
Apical view of a shell of Elachorbis tatei

== Description ==
The small shell varies in thickness. It possesses two coarse, spiral keels (a spiral ridge usually marking a change of slope in the outline of the shell) that can vary in strength or even be obsolete. The shell has a wide perspective umbilicus, and a discontinuous peristome.
