= Calopiidae =

Scientific classification
- Kingdom: Animalia
- Phylum: Mollusca
- Class: Gastropoda
- Subclass: Caenogastropoda
- Order: Littorinimorpha
- Superfamily: Truncatelloidea
- Family: Calopiidae; Ponder, 1999

Family of gastropods

Calopiidae is a family of sea snails, marine gastropod molluscs in the superfamily Truncatelloidea.
