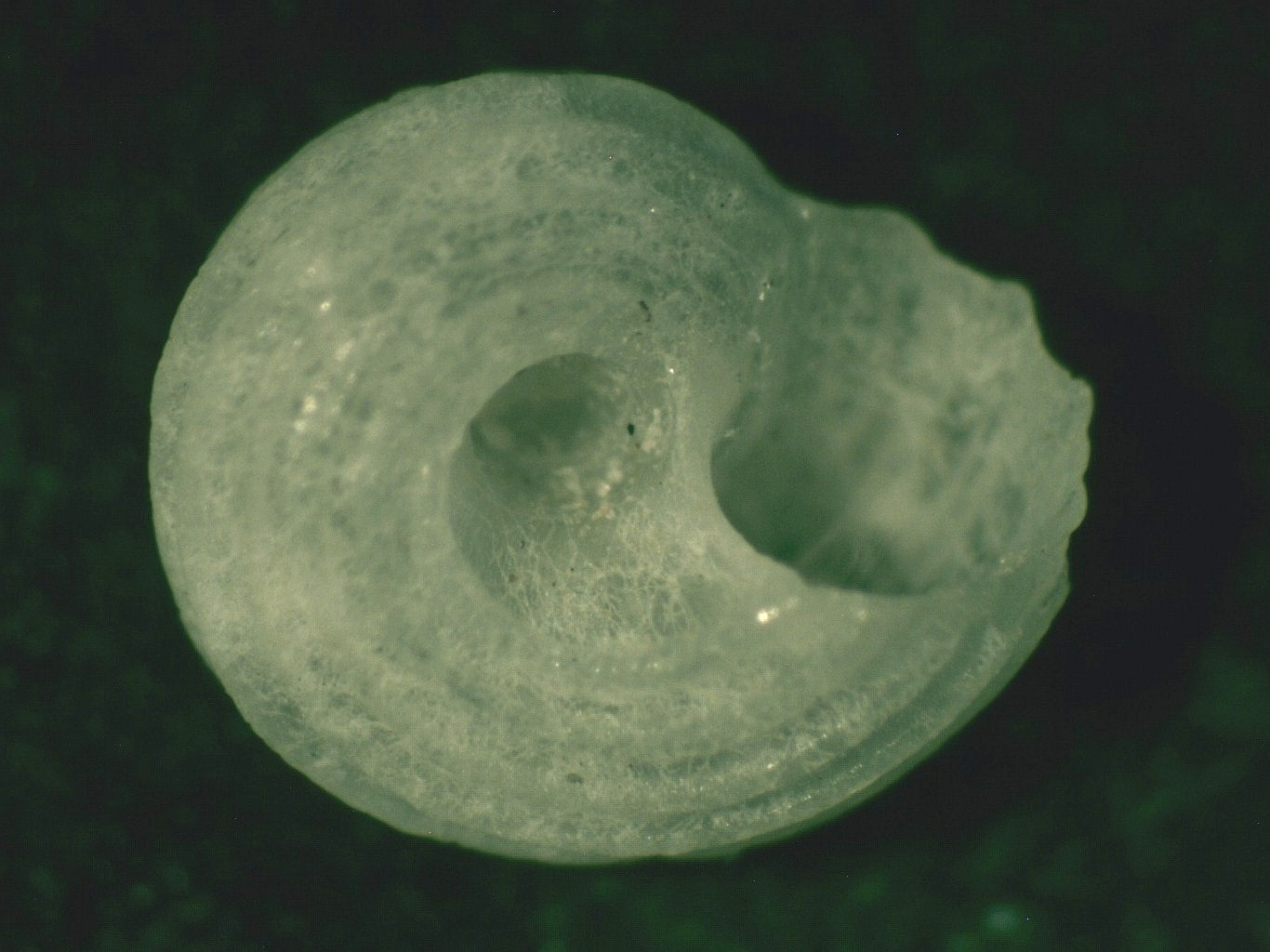
- Ventral view of a shell of Elachorbis tatei, the type species of the genus Elachorbis.

Scientific classification
- Kingdom: Animalia
- Phylum: Mollusca
- Class: Gastropoda
- Subclass: Caenogastropoda
- Order: Littorinimorpha
- Family: Tornidae
- Genus: Elachorbis; Iredale, 1914

Species
- See text

= Elachorbis =

Elachorbis Temporal range: Oligocene–Recent

Genus of gastropods

Elachorbis is a genus of minute sea snails or micromolluscs, marine gastropod molluscs in the family Tornidae.

== Taxonomy ==
The exact placement of this genus has long been contested.

Tom Iredale established Elachorbis in 1914 within the family Liotiidae. Cotton (1945) also classified Elachorbis within the family Liotiidae. Powell (1979) and ITIS (2011) classified Elachorbis within the family Cyclostrematidae (which is a synonym of Liotiidae).

Various authors have classified this genus in the Skeneidae, which is now the Skeneinae, a subfamily within the Turbinidae.

The genus Elachorbis is sometimes referred to the subfamily Vitrinellinae within the family Tornidae. However, Elachorbis is also sometimes considered to be a synonym of Circulus; Circulus is the type genus of the subfamily Circulinae within the Tornidae.

== Species ==
Species within the genus Elachorbis include:

- Elachorbis diaphana Finlay, 1924
- Elachorbis subtatei (Suter, 1907)
- Elachorbis tatei (Angas, 1878) - type species of the genus Elachorbis - synonyms: Cyclostrema tatei Angas, 1878; Circulus tatei (Angas, 1878)
