= Caledoniellidae =

Scientific classification
- Kingdom: Animalia
- Phylum: Mollusca
- Class: Gastropoda
- Subclass: Caenogastropoda
- Order: Littorinimorpha
- Superfamily: Truncatelloidea
- Family: Caledoniellidae; Rosewater, 1969

Genera
- Caledoniella Souverbie, 1869; Sigaretornus Iredale, 1936

Family of molluscs

Caledoniellidae is a family of marine gastropods in the superfamily Truncatelloidea that are specialized ectoparasites of mantis shrimp in the family Gonodactylidae. The taxonomy of this family has historically been problematic, with the type genus being assigned to various classifications within Caenogastropoda prior to more modern research, and having a junior synonym, Episthethe, by Preston in 1912, and the type species of Sigaretornus, S. planus, was originally described as Adeorbis sigaretinus by Pilsbry in 1897 before being described as its own genus by Iredale in 1936. The genus Caledoniella ranges across the Western Indo-Pacific and has been documented parasitizing the Gonodactylid genera Gonodactylus, Gonodactylolus, and Gonodactylellus.
