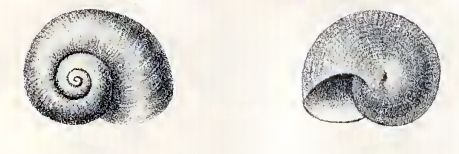
- Drawing with two views of a shell of Leucorhynchia punctata

Scientific classification
- Kingdom: Animalia
- Phylum: Mollusca
- Class: Gastropoda
- Subclass: Vetigastropoda
- Order: Trochida
- Family: Skeneidae
- Genus: Leucorhynchia
- Species: L. punctata

Binomial name
- Leucorhynchia punctata (Jousseaume, 1872)

Synonyms
- Teinostoma dalli Dautzenberg, 1912; Teinostoma punctatum Jousseaume, 1872

= Leucorhynchia punctata =

Species of gastropod

Leucorhynchia punctata is a species of sea snail, a marine gastropod mollusk in the family Skeneidae.

== Description ==
The shell has a diameter of 2.5 mm. The solid, yellowish white, subtranslucent shell has a depressed convex shape. It is more flattened below. The umbilicus is almost covered. The surface is covered by microscopic, close granular spiral striae, more apparent at the suture and around the umbilicus.

== Distribution ==
This species occurs in the Atlantic Ocean off Angola, São Tomé and Príncipe, Ghana and Guinea.
