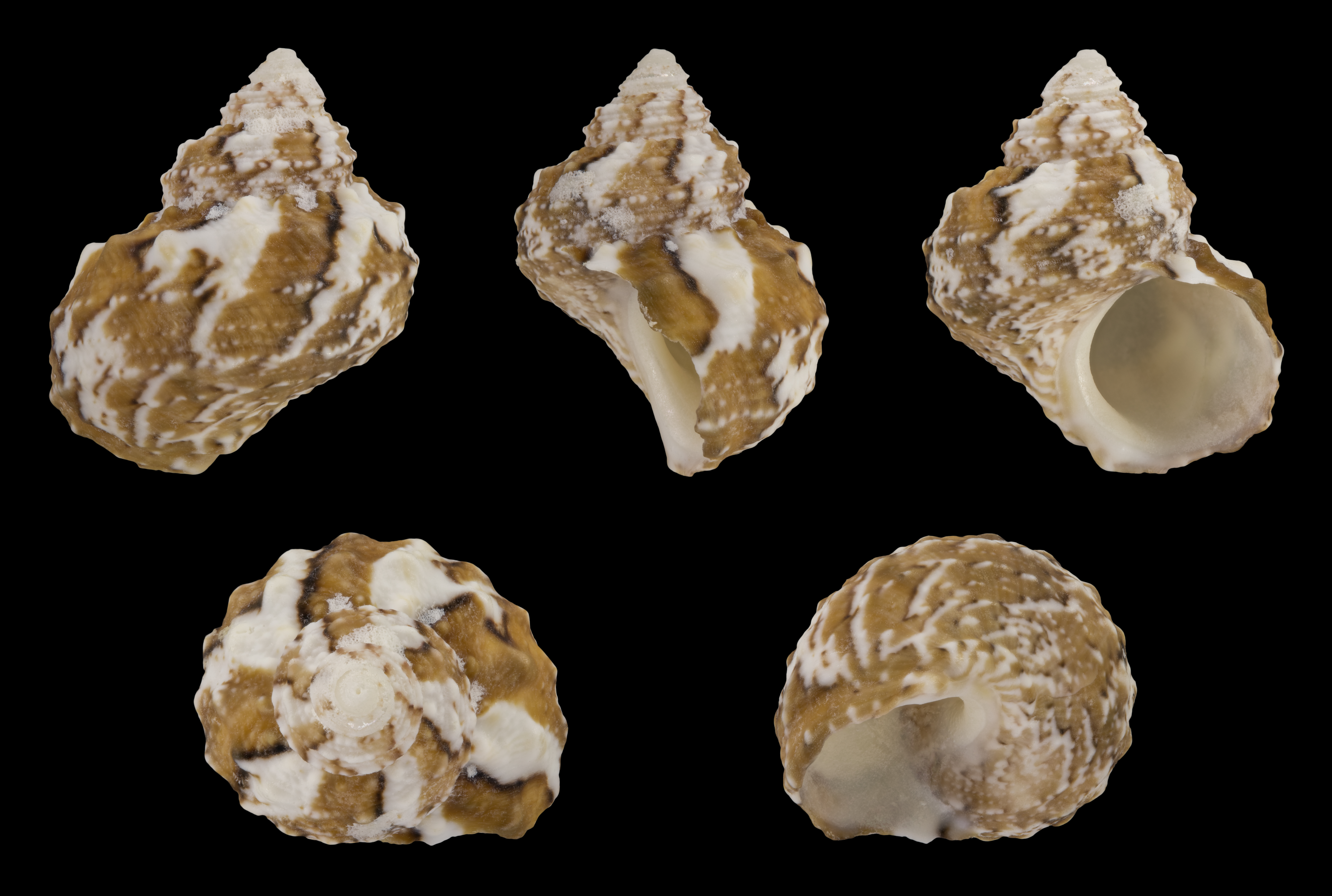

Scientific classification
- Kingdom: Animalia
- Phylum: Mollusca
- Class: Gastropoda
- Subclass: Vetigastropoda
- Order: Trochida
- Family: Turbinidae
- Genus: Turbo
- Species: T. castanea

Binomial name
- Turbo castanea Gmelin, 1791

Synonyms
- Aorotrema erraticum Pilsbry & McGinty, 1945; Lunatica granulata Röding, 1798; Lunatica tuberculata Röding, 1798; Trochus quadriseriatus Anton, 1838; Turbo ayersi Olsson, 1967; Turbo castanea f. crenulata Gmelin, 1791; Turbo castanea f. moltkiana Gmelin, 1791; Turbo castaneus Gmelin, 1791; Turbo crenulatus Gmelin, 1791; Turbo granulata Röding, 1798; Turbo hippocastanum Lamarck, 1822; Turbo mammillatus Donovan, E., 1804; Turbo muricatus Usticke, 1959; Turbo venezuelensis Weisbord, 1962; Turbo versicolor Usticke, 1959; Turbo virens Anton, 1839; Turbo (Lunatica) granulata Röding, P.F., 1798; Turbo (Marmarostoma) castanea Gmelin, 1791

= Turbo castanea =

Species of gastropod

Turbo castanea, common names chestnut turban, chestnut turban snail-brown and cat eye snail, is a species of sea snail, marine gastropod mollusk in the family Turbinidae.

== Distribution ==
Distribution of Turbo castanea include: Aruba, Belize, Bonaire, Caribbean Sea, Cayman Islands, Colombia, Costa Rica, Cuba, Curaçao, Gulf of Mexico, Hispaniola, Jamaica, Mexico, Panama, Puerto Rico, Venezuela.; in the Atlantic Ocean from North Carolina to Brazil.

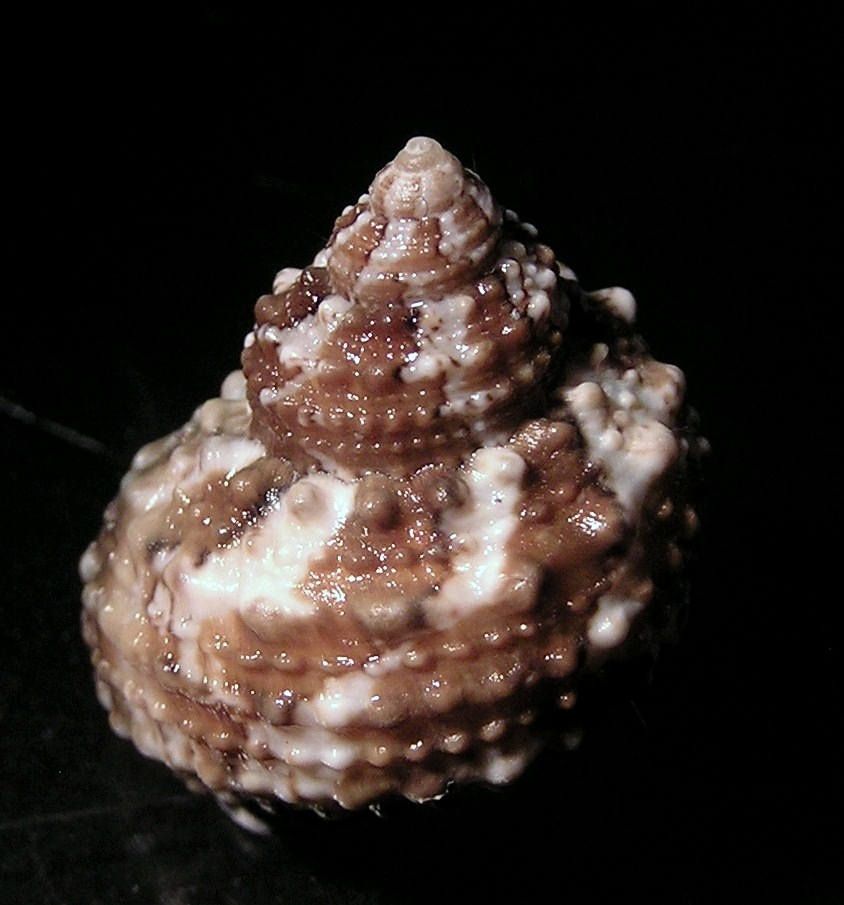
Abapertural view

== Description ==
The maximum recorded shell length is 55 mm.

This is an abundant species that is variable both in color and the prominence of the sculpture. The solid, imperforate shell has an ovate-conic shape. It is orange-colored, brown or gray, sometimes banded, flammulated, or maculated with white or brown. The conic spire is acute. The suture is subcanaliculate. The 5-6 convex whorls are somewhat flattened in the middle. They are ornamented with numerous unequal spiral granose, spinose or squamose lirae, of which the subsutural and three or four submedian are more prominent. The typical form is very sharply sculptured, the principal lirae occasionally bearing vaulted scales. The white aperture is subcircular, and subangular above. There is no umbilicus. The peristome is slightly produced below. The columella has a heavy white callus.

The operculum is castaneous within, with four rapidly increasing whorls. Its nucleus is one-third the distance across the face. The outer surface is convex and nearly smooth. It is white, or stained with brown and green around the middle.

== Habitat ==
Minimum recorded depth is 0 m. Maximum recorded depth is 141 m.
