= Spirostyliferinidae =

Scientific classification
- Kingdom: Animalia
- Phylum: Mollusca
- Class: Gastropoda
- Subclass: Caenogastropoda
- Order: Littorinimorpha
- Superfamily: Truncatelloidea
- Family: Spirostyliferinidae; Layton, Middelfart, Tatarnic & N. G. Wilson, 2019

Family of gastropods

Spirostyliferinidae is a family of small, mainly freshwater snails, (some also occur in other habitats) that have gills and an operculum, aquatic gastropod mollusks in the superfamily Truncatelloidea.

== Genera ==
- Spirostyliferina Bandel, 2006

Genera brought into synonymy

- Hoenselaaria Moolenbeek, 2009 : synonym of Spirostyliferina Bandel, 2006
