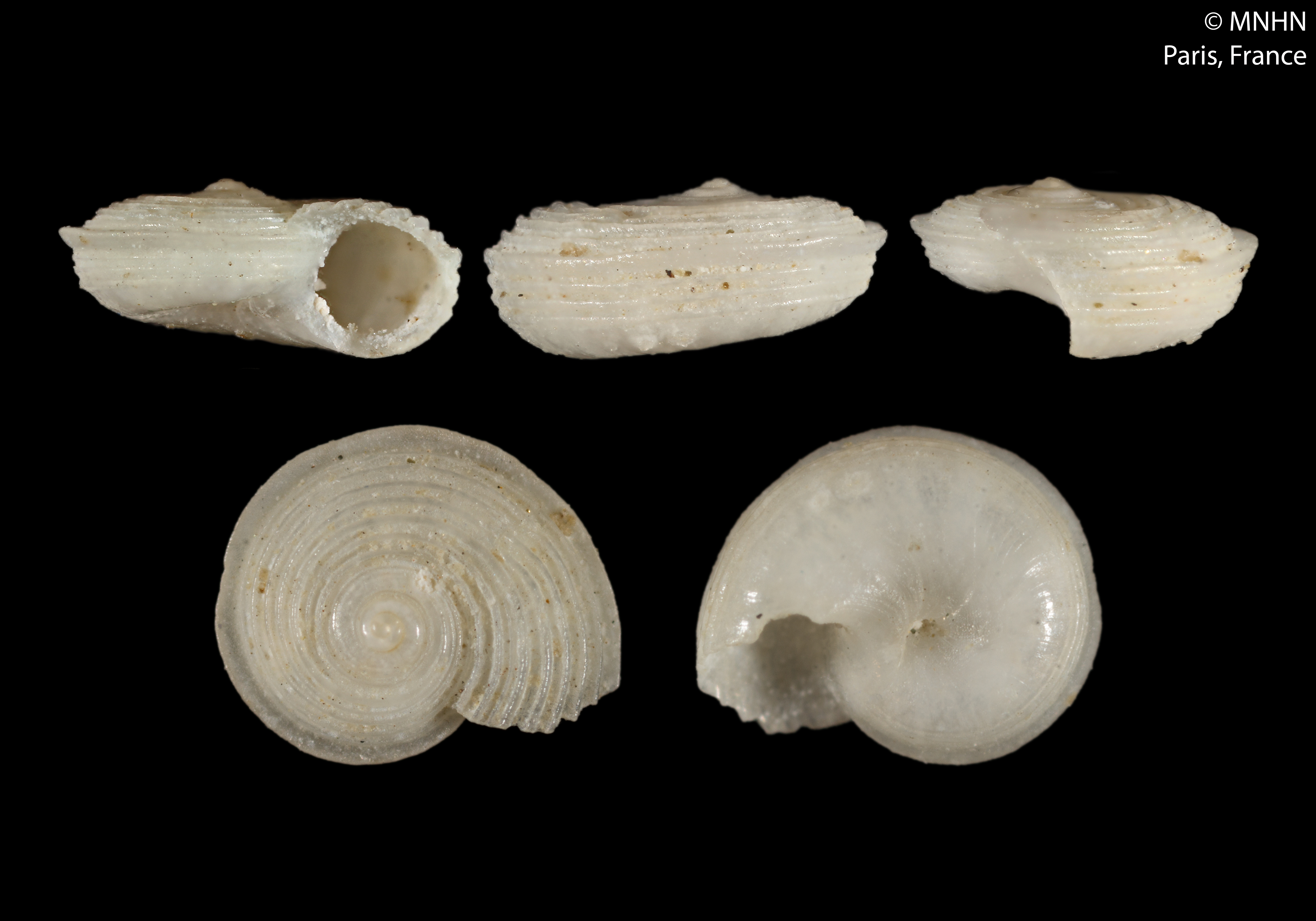
- Shell of Teinostoma deschampsi (syntype at MNHN, Paris)

Scientific classification
- Kingdom: Animalia
- Phylum: Mollusca
- Class: Gastropoda
- Subclass: Caenogastropoda
- Order: Littorinimorpha
- Superfamily: Truncatelloidea
- Family: Teinostomatidae; Cossmann, 1917

Genera
- See text

Synonyms
- Teinostomatinae Cossmann, 1917 (original rank)

= Teinostomatidae =

Family of gastropods

Teinostomatidae is a family of very small and minute sea snails with an operculum, marine gastropod mollusks in the superfamily Truncatelloidea.

== Genera ==
- Teinostoma H. Adams & A. Adams, 1853

Synonyms

- Pseudorotella P. Fischer, 1857: synonym of Teinostoma H. Adams & A. Adams, 1853
- Tinostoma P. Fischer, 1885: synonym of Teinostoma H. Adams & A. Adams, 1853 (Unjustified emendation)
