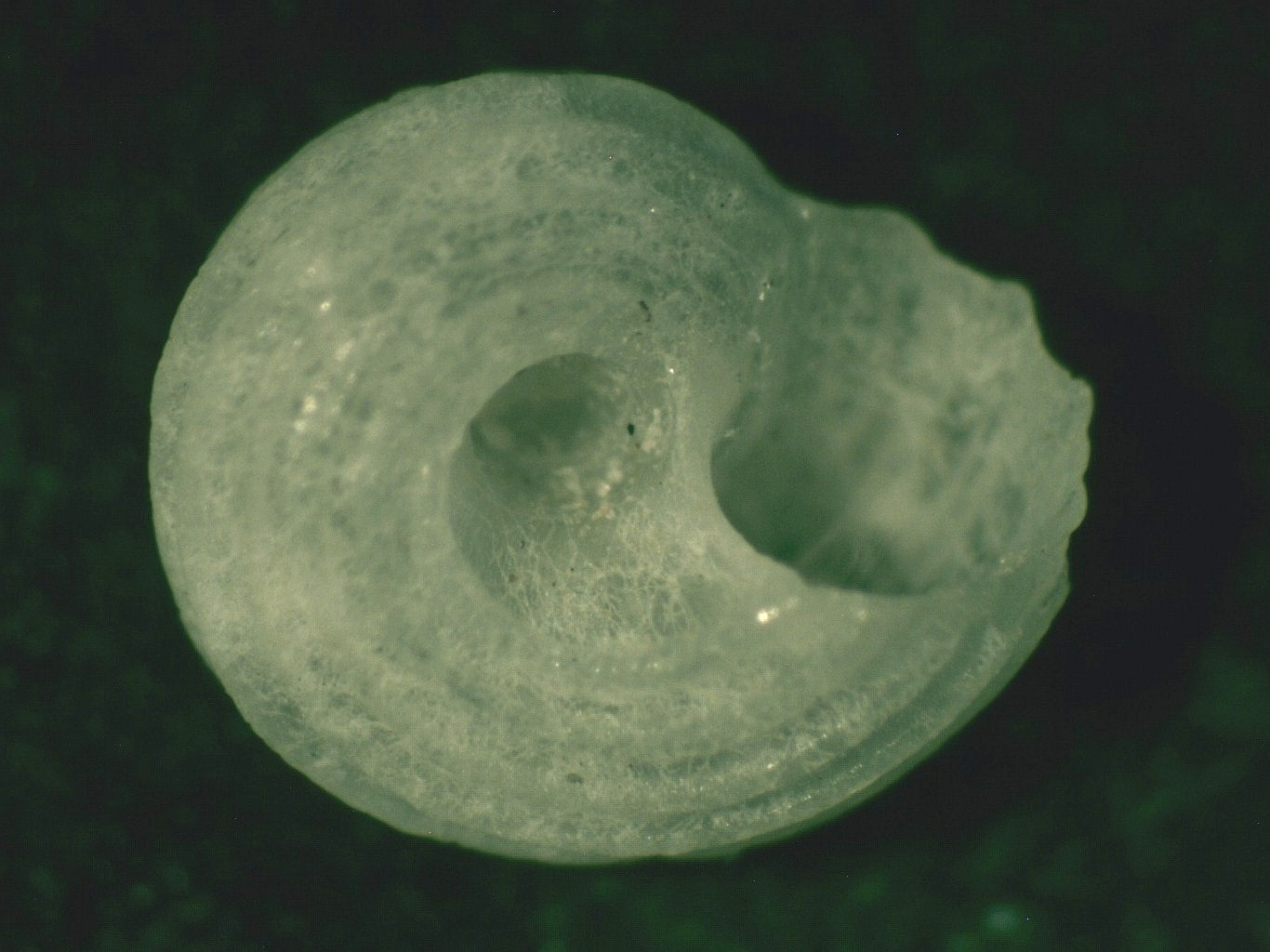
- Ventral view of a shell of Elachorbis tatei

Scientific classification
- Kingdom: Animalia
- Phylum: Mollusca
- Class: Gastropoda
- Subclass: Caenogastropoda
- Order: Littorinimorpha
- Superfamily: Truncatelloidea
- Family: Tornidae; Sacco, 1896 (1884)

Genera
- See text

Synonyms
- Adeorbidae Monterosato, 1884

= Tornidae =

Family of gastropods

Tornidae is a family of very small and minute sea snails with an operculum, marine gastropod mollusks in the clade Littorinimorpha. This family used to be known as the Vitrinellidae. Iredale has shown that the family Adeorbidae Monterosato, 1884 should be called Tornidae

Family names cited with two dates (the second one in parentheses) are those ruled by Article 40(2) of ICZN. "If ... a family-group name was replaced before 1961 because of the synonymy of the type genus, the replacement name is to be maintained if it is in prevailing usage. A name maintained by virtue of this Article retains its own author [and date, the first date cited] but takes the priority of the replaced name [the date cited in parentheses, here alluding to Adeorbidae Monterosato, 1884]

== General characteristics ==
The shells of the snails in this family are minute, colorless and glassy.

The paucispiral shell is umbilicated, auriform and depressed. The entire aperture is oblique. The shell has a simple columella, and a rounded, sharp outer lip. The corneous operculum is paucispiral, and has an eccentric nucleus.

The body of the animal differs from species in the family Trochidae by having no cirriform appendages of the foot. The radula is taenioglossate. (Thiele, 1925)

== Subfamilies ==
The following subfamilies were recognized in the 2005 taxonomy of Bouchet & Rocroi, but have now become alternate representations:

- Circulinae Fretter & Graham, 1962
- Torninae Sacco, 1896 (1884)
- Teinostomatinae Cossmann, 1917 (upgraded in 2021 to family level Teinostomatidae Cossmann, 1917)
- Vitrinellinae Bush, 1897

== Genera ==
Genera in the family Tornidae include:

- † Adeorbella Briart & Cornet, 1887
- Anticlimax Pilsbry & McGinty, 1946
- Aorotrema Schwengel & McGinty, 1942
- Canimarina Aguayo & Borro, 1946: synonym of Anticlimax Pilsbry & McGinty, 1946
- † Cantaurea Landau, da Silva & Heitz, 2016
- Caperella Laseron, 1958
- Circlotoma Laseron, 1958
- Circuitus Rubio & Rolán, 2017
- Circulter Laseron, 1958
- Cochliolepis Stimpson, 1958
- Cyclostremiscus Pilsbry & Olsson, 1945
- Discopsis de Folin, 1870
- Discreliotia Laseron, 1958
- Elachorbis Iredale, 1914
- Episcynia Mörch, 1875
- Esmeralda Pilsbry & Olsson, 1952
- Laciniorbis Martens, 1897
- Lophocochlias Pilsbry, 1921
- Lydiphnis Melvill, 1906
- † Megatyloma Cossmann, 1888
- Moeniatoma Laseron, 1958
- Neusas Warén & Bouchet, 2001
- Ovini Simone, 2013
- Panastoma Pilsbry & Olsson, 1945
- Parviturboides Pilsbry & McGinty, 1949
- Peripitoma Laseron, 1958
- Pleuromalaxis Pilsbry & McGinty, 1945
- † Pterolabrella Maxwell, 1969
- Pygmaeorota Kuroda & Habe, 1954
- Scissilabra Bartsch, 1907
- Scrupus Finlay, 1927
- Sigaretornus Iredale, 1936
- Solariorbis Conrad, 1865
- Tholostoma Laseron, 1958
- Tornus Turton & Kingston, 1830
- Tuberes Rubio & Rolán, 2017
- Uzumakiella Habe, 1958
- Vitridomus Pilsbry & Olsson, 1945
- Vitrinorbis Pilsbry & Olsson, 1952
- Woodringilla Pilsbry & Olsson, 1951

Genera brought into synonymy

- Adeorbis S.V. Wood, 1842: synonym of Tornus Turton & Kingston, 1830
- Climacia Dall, 1903: synonym of Anticlimax Pilsbry & McGinty, 1946
- Climacina Aguayo & Borro, 1946: synonym of Anticlimax Pilsbry & McGinty, 1946
- Liochrysta Laseron, 1958: synonym of Pseudoliotia Tate, 1898
- Lioprora Laseron, 1958: synonym of Canimarina Aguayo & Borro, 1946
- Miralabrum Pilsbry & Olsson, 1945: synonym of Cyclostremiscus Pilsbry & Olsson, 1945
- Ponocyclus Pilsbry, 1953: synonym of Cyclostremiscus Pilsbry & Olsson, 1945
- Pygmaerota Kuroda & Habe, 1952: synonym of Pygmaeorota Kuroda & Habe, 1954
- Soyorota Habe, 1961: synonym of Circulus Jeffreys, 1865

Alternate representations

- Subfamily Circulinae Fretter & Graham, 1962
- Subfamily Torninae Sacco, 1896 (1884)
- Subfamily Vitrinellinae Bush, 1897
