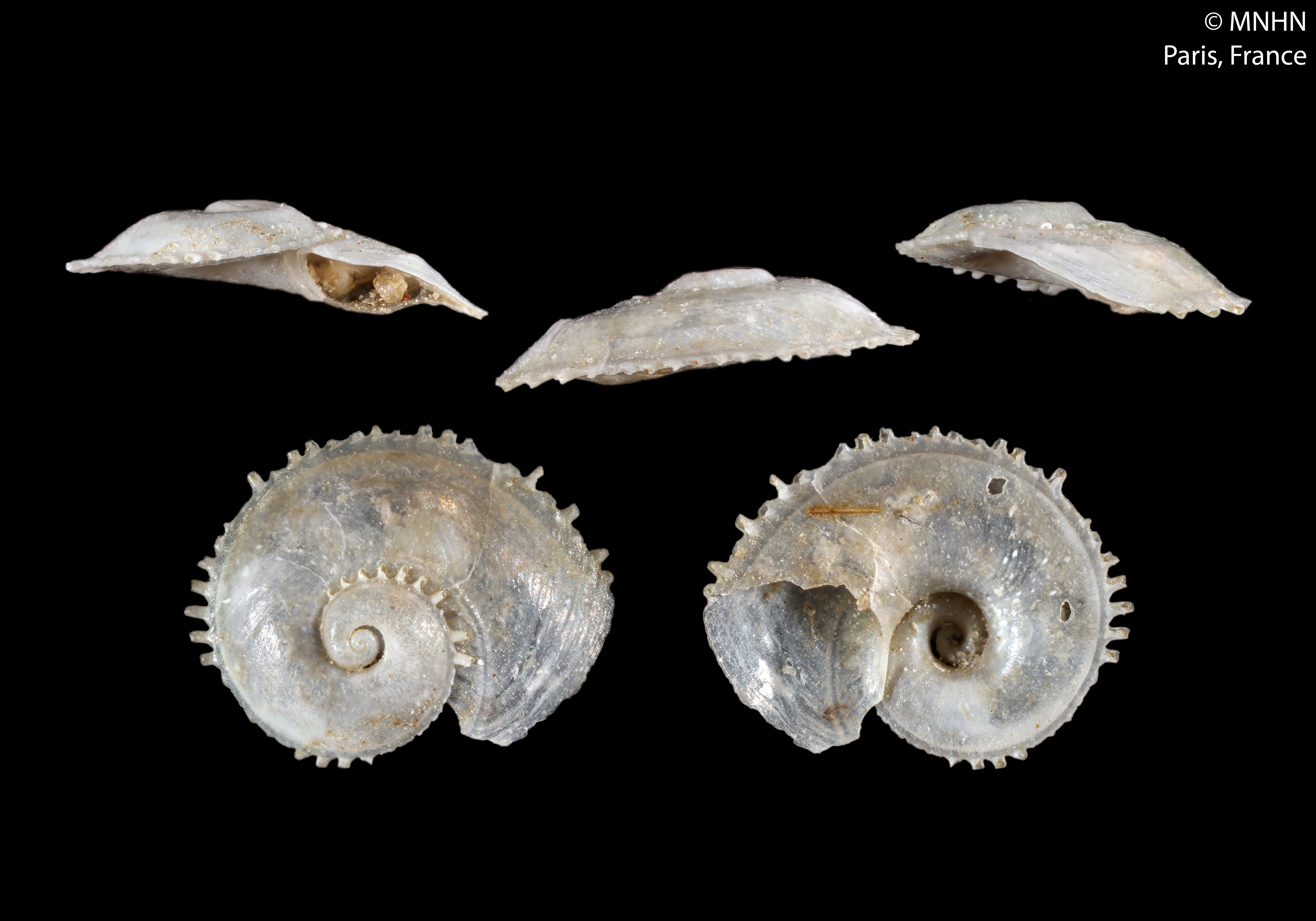
- Discopsis gruveli

Scientific classification
- Kingdom: Animalia
- Phylum: Mollusca
- Class: Gastropoda
- Subclass: Caenogastropoda
- Order: Littorinimorpha
- Superfamily: Truncatelloidea; Gray, 1840

= Truncatelloidea =

Superfamily of gastropods

Truncatelloidea is a superfamily of snails, gastropod mollusks in the clade Caenogastropoda.

The families are marine, brackish, freshwater and terrestrial.

== Families ==
- Amnicolidae Tryon, 1863
- Anabathridae Keen, 1971
- Ascorhiidae Ponder, Nimbs & Shea, 2023
- Assimineidae H. Adams & A. Adams, 1856
- Baicaliidae P. Fischer, 1885
- Beddomeiidae Ponder, Nimbs & Shea, 2023
- Bithyniidae Gray, 1857
- Bythinellidae Locard, 1893
- Caecidae Gray, 1850
- Caledoniellidae Rosewater, 1969
- Calopiidae Ponder, 1999
- Clenchiellidae D. W. Taylor, 1966
- Cochliopidae Tryon, 1866
- Elachisinidae Ponder, 1985
- Emmericiidae Brusina, 1870
- Epigridae Ponder, 1985
- Erhaiidae G. M. Davis & Y.-H. Kuo, 1985
- Falsicingulidae Slavoshevskaya, 1975
- Fontigentidae D. W. Taylor, 1966
- Helicostoidae Pruvot-Fol, 1937: synonym of Helicostoinae Pruvot-Fol, 1937 (superseded rank)
- Hydrobiidae Stimpson, 1865
- Hydrococcidae Thiele, 1928
- Iravadiidae Thiele, 1928
- Lithoglyphidae Tryon, 1866
- Lithoglyphulidae Radoman, 1973: synonym of Horatiinae D. W. Taylor, 1966
- Litthabitellidae Falniowski & Hofman, 2023
- † Mesocochliopidae X.-H. Yu, 1987
- Moitessieriidae Bourguignat, 1863
- † Palaeobaicaliidae Sitnikova & Vinarski, 2023
- Pomatiopsidae Stimpson, 1865
- Spirostyliferinidae Layton, Middelfart, Tatarnic & N. G. Wilson, 2019
- Squamapicidae L.-J. Zhang & von Rintelen, 2024
- Stenothyridae Tryon, 1866
- Tateidae Thiele, 1925
- Teinostomatidae Cossmann, 1917
- Tomichiidae Wenz, 1938
- Tornidae Sacco, 1896 (1884)
- Truncatellidae Gray, 1840
- Vitrinellidae Bush, 1897
- Unassigned to a family : Aenigmula Golding, 2014

Synonyms

- Adeorbidae Monterosato, 1884 synonym of Tornidae Sacco, 1896 (1884)
- Benedictiidae Clessin, 1880: synonym of Benedictiinae Clessin, 1880 (new rank)
- Circulidae Fretter & Graham, 1962: synonym of Vitrinellidae Bush, 1897
- Fairbankiinae Thiele, 1928: synonym of Iravadiidae Thiele, 1928
- Subfamily Hemistomiinae Thiele, 1929: synonym of Tateidae Thiele, 1925
- Hyalidae Golikov & Starobogatov, 1975: synonym of Iravadiidae Thiele, 1928
- Kolhymamnicolidae Starobogatov, 1983: synonym of Amnicolinae Tryon, 1863
- Limnoreidae B. Dybowski, 1911: synonym of Baicaliinae P. Fischer, 1885 (invalid: type genus a junior homonym)
- Paludestrinidae Newton, 1891 synonym of Hydrobiidae Stimpson, 1865
- Potamopyrgidae F. C. Baker, 1928: synonym of Tateidae Thiele, 1925
- Pseudomerelininae Starobogatov, 1989: synonym of Iravadiidae Thiele, 1928
- Pyrgulidae Brusina, 1882 (1869) synonym of Hydrobiidae Stimpson, 1865
