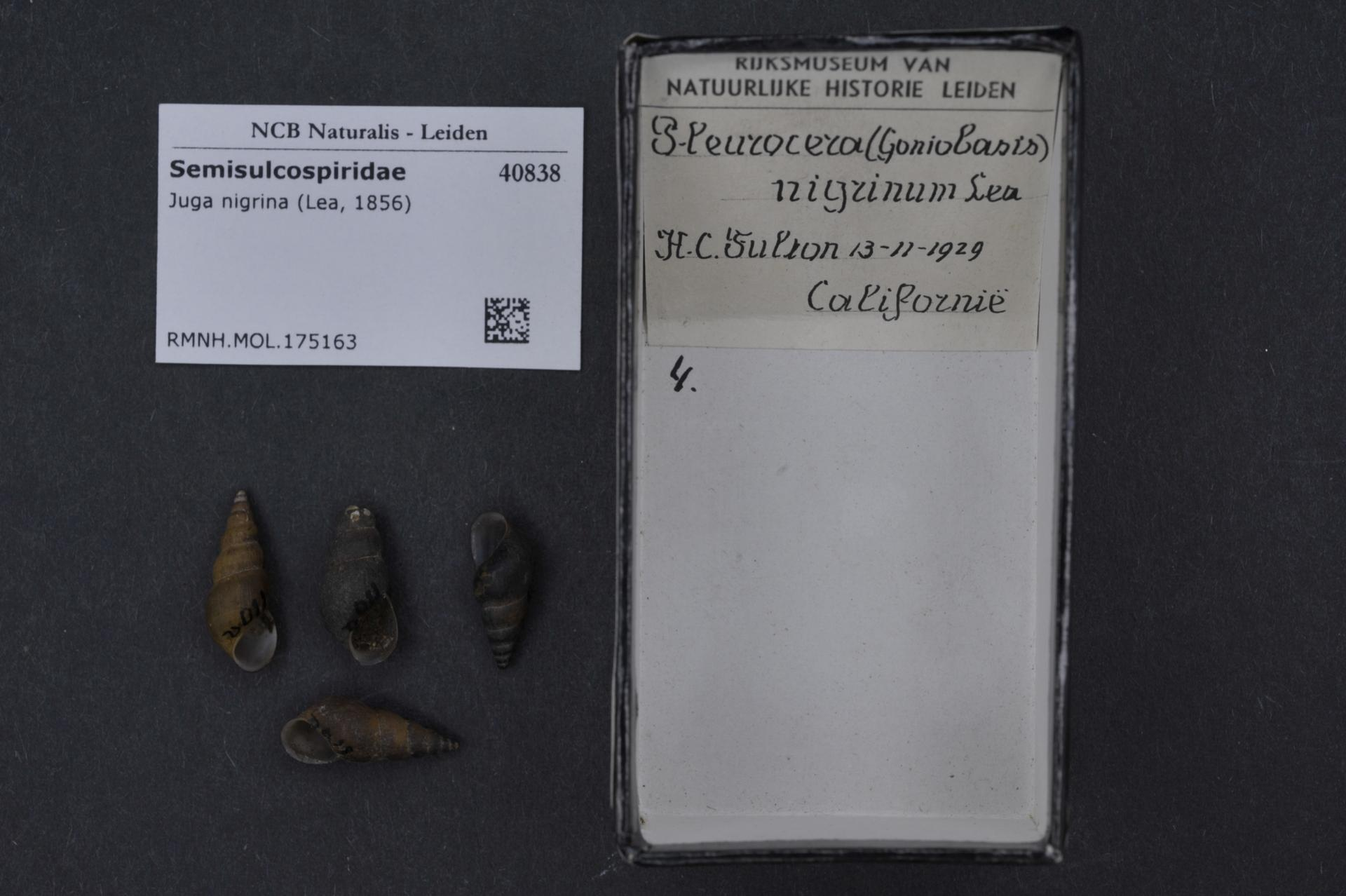
- Shells at the Naturalis Biodiversity Center

Scientific classification
- Kingdom: Animalia
- Phylum: Mollusca
- Class: Gastropoda
- Subclass: Caenogastropoda
- Order: incertae sedis
- Family: Semisulcospiridae
- Genus: Juga; H. Adams & A. Adams, 1854

= Juga =

Genus of gastropods

Juga is a genus of freshwater snails with a gill and an operculum, aquatic gastropod mollusks in the family Semisulcospiridae.

These snails are native to the rivers of the northwestern United States and adjacent British Columbia. Several species are endemic to isolated large springs in the American Great Basin.

The most abundant and widespread species, Juga plicifera, attains a height of up to 35 mm. It is sculpted with fine spiral ridges and variably developed ribs that frequently disappear in parts of the shell made as the animal matures.

== Species ==
The following species and subspecies are recognized:

Subgenus Juga s.s.

- Juga hemphilli (J. Henderson, 1935)
  - Juga hemphilli dallesensis (J. Henderson, 1935)
  - Juga hemphilli maupinensis (J. Henderson, 1935)
- Juga plicifera (I. Lea, 1838)
- Juga silicula (Gould, 1847)

Subgenus Calibasis

- Juga acutifilosa (Stearns, 1890)
  - Juga acutifilosa pittensis
  - Juga acutifilosa siskiyouensis
- Juga occata (Hinds, 1844)

Subgenus Oreobasis

- Juga bulbosa (Gould, 1847)
- Juga interioris (Goodrich, 1944)
- Juga laurae (Goodrich, 1944)
- Juga nigrina (I. Lea, 1856)

subgenus ?

- Juga chacei (Henderson, 1935)
- Juga newberryi (I. Lea, 1860)
- Juga orickensis (Henderson, 1935)

== Ecology ==
Parasites of Juga spp. include the bacterium Neorickettsia risticii, which causes Potomac horse fever along with the associated trematode vector. Juga species are also infected with the bacterium Neorickettsia helminthoeca and its associated fluke, Nanophyetus salmincola
