= Neorickettsia =

Genus of bacteria

- Specialty: Infectious disease

Neorickettsia

Scientific classification
- Domain: Bacteria
- Kingdom: Pseudomonadati
- Phylum: Pseudomonadota
- Class: Alphaproteobacteria
- Order: Rickettsiales
- Family: Anaplasmataceae
- Genus: Neorickettsia; Philip et al. 1953 (Approved Lists 1980)

Species
- See text.

Neorickettsia is a genus of bacteria. Species or strains in this genus are coccoid or pleomorphic cells that reside in cytoplasmic vacuoles within monocytes and macrophages of dogs, horses, bats, and humans.

Neorickettsia sennetsu causes Sennetsu ehrlichiosis. Unlike other forms of ehrlichiosis, Neorickettsia sennetsu is transmitted by trematodes from fish. Neorickettsia risticii causes Potomac horse fever. Neorickettsia helminthoeca is found in association with the trematode Nanophyetus salmincola, and causes salmon poisoning disease in dogs and other canids. Neorickettsia elokominica causes a similar disease, Elokomin fluke fever, in canids and other species.

== Species ==
- Neorickettsia risticii
- Neorickettsia sennetsu
- Neorickettsia elokominica
- Neorickettsia helminthoeca
