= Freshwater snail =

Gastropod mollusks that live in fresh water

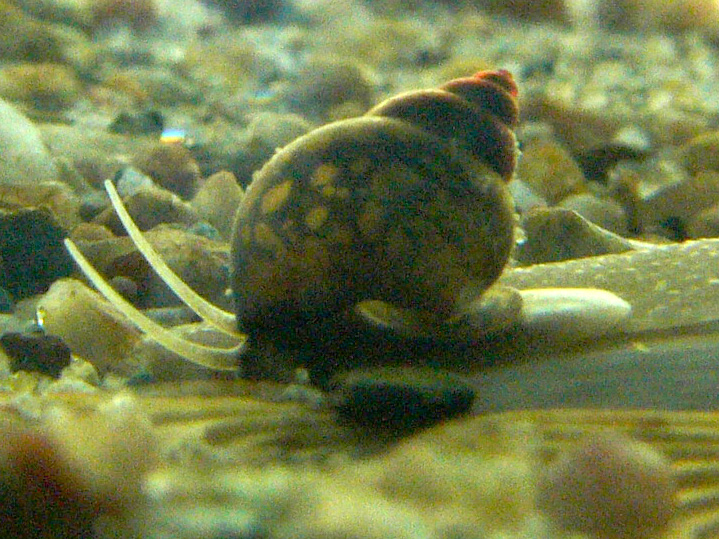
Bithynia tentaculata, a small freshwater gastropod in the family Bithyniidae

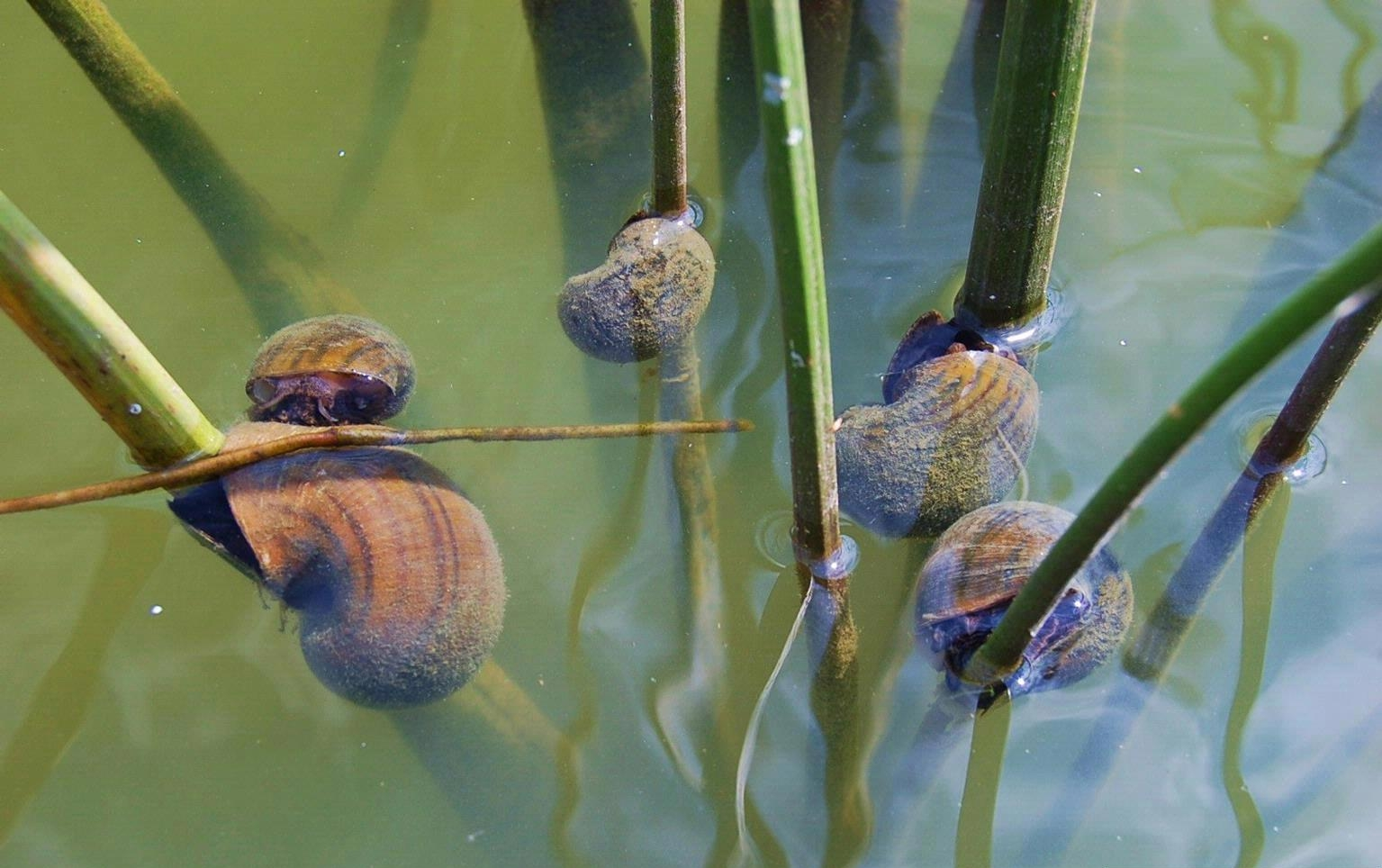
Pomacea insularum, an apple snail

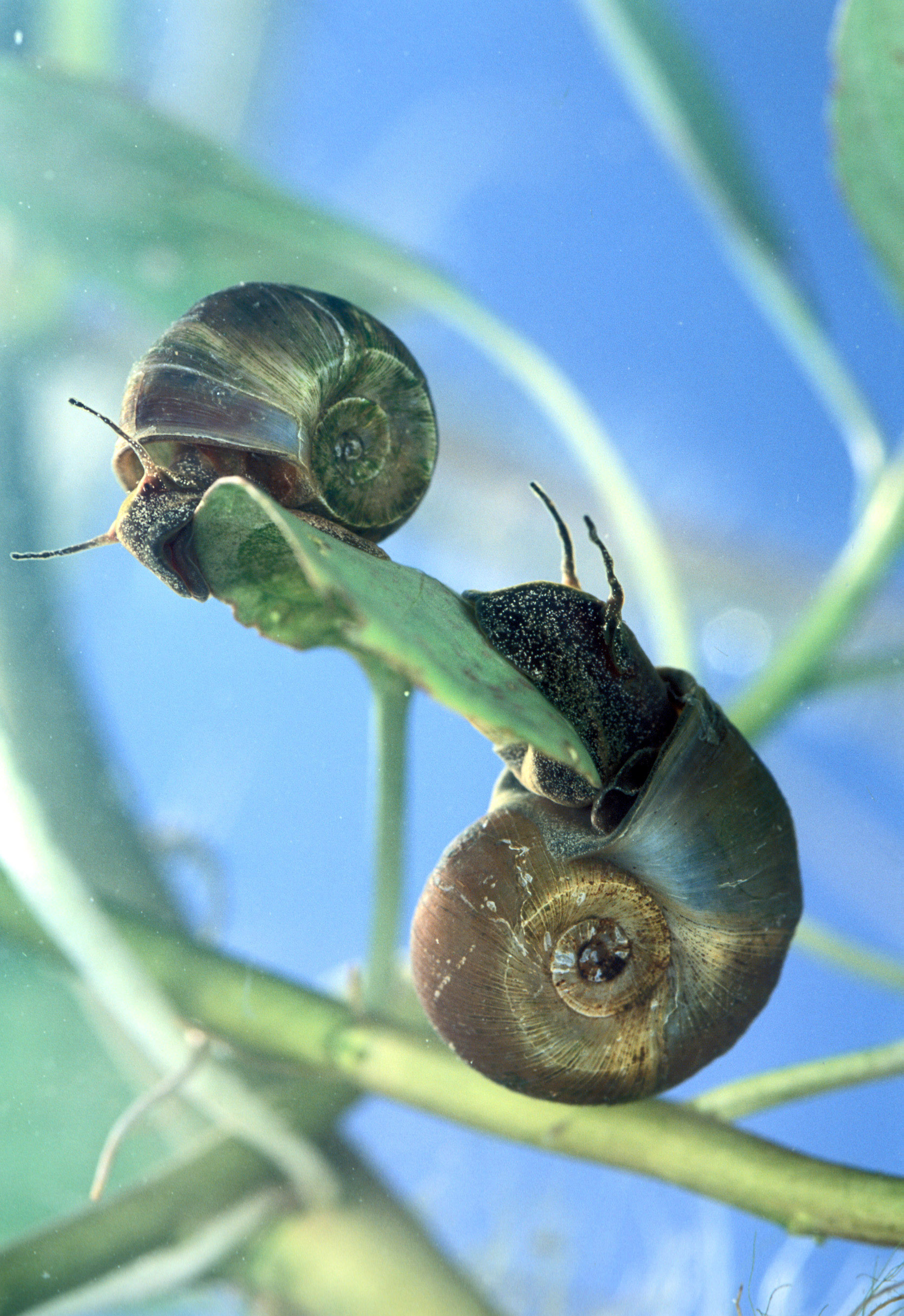
Planorbella trivolvis, an air-breathing ramshorn snail

Freshwater snails are gastropod mollusks that live in fresh water. There are many different families. They are found throughout the world in various habitats, ranging from ephemeral pools to the largest lakes, and from small seeps and springs to major rivers. The great majority of freshwater gastropods have a shell, with very few exceptions. Some groups of snails that live in freshwater respire using gills, whereas other groups need to reach the surface to breathe air. In addition, some are amphibious and have both gills and a lung (e.g. Ampullariidae). Most feed on algae, but many are detritivores and some are filter feeders.

Freshwater snails are indirectly among the deadliest animals to humans, as they carry parasitic worms that cause schistosomiasis, a disease estimated to kill between 10,000 and 200,000 people annually.

There are thousands of known species, and at least 33–38 independent lineages of gastropods have successfully colonized freshwater environments. It is not possible to quantify the exact number of these lineages yet, because they have yet to be clarified within the Cerithioidea. From six to eight of these independent lineages occur in North America.

== Taxonomy ==
According to a 2008 review of the taxonomy, there are about 4,000 species of freshwater gastropods (3,795–3,972). As of 2023, there are 5182 known species of fossil freshwater gastropods.

The following cladogram is an overview of the main clades of gastropods based on the taxonomy of Bouchet & Rocroi (2005), modified after Jörger et al. (2010) and simplified with families that contain freshwater species marked in boldface: (Marine gastropods (Siphonarioidea, Sacoglossa, Amphiboloidea, Pyramidelloidea) are not depicted within Panpulmonata for simplification. Some of these highlighted families consist entirely of freshwater species, but some of them also contain, or even mainly consist of, marine species.)

- - † Paleozoic molluscs of uncertain systematic position
  - † Basal taxa that are certainly Gastropoda
  - Patellogastropoda
  - Vetigastropoda
  - Cocculiniformia
  - Neritimorpha
    - † Paleozoic Neritimorpha of uncertain systematic position
    - † Cyrtoneritimorpha
    - Cycloneritimorpha: **Neritiliidae** and **Neritidae**
  - Caenogastropoda
    - Caenogastropoda of uncertain systematic position
    - Architaenioglossa: **Ampullariidae** and **Viviparidae**
    - Sorbeoconcha: **Melanopsidae**, **Pachychilidae**, **Paludomidae**, **Pleuroceridae**, **Semisulcospiridae** and **Thiaridae**
    - Hypsogastropoda
      - Littorinimorpha: **Littorinidae**, **Amnicolidae**, **Assimineidae**, **Bithyniidae**, **Cochliopidae**, **Helicostoidae**, **Hydrobiidae**, **Lithoglyphidae**, **Moitessieriidae**, **Pomatiopsidae**, **Stenothyridae** and **Tateidae**
      - Ptenoglossa
      - Neogastropoda: **Nassariidae** and **Marginellidae**
  - Heterobranchia
    - Lower Heterobranchia: **Valvatidae**
    - Euthyneura
      - Nudipleura
      - - Euopisthobranchia
        - Panpulmonata
          - Glacidorboidea with the only family **Glacidorbidae**
          - - Hygrophila: **Chilinidae**, **Latiidae**, **Acroloxidae**, **Lymnaeidae**. **Planorbidae** ► and **Physidae**
            - - Acochlidiacea: **Acochlidiidae**, **Tantulidae** and **Strubelliidae**
              - Eupulmonata

=== Neritimorpha ===
The Neritimorpha are a group of primitive "prosobranch" gilled snails which have a shelly operculum.

- Neritiliidae — 5 extant freshwater species
- Neritidae — largely confined to the tropics, also the rivers of Europe, family includes the marine "nerites". There are about 110 extant freshwater species.
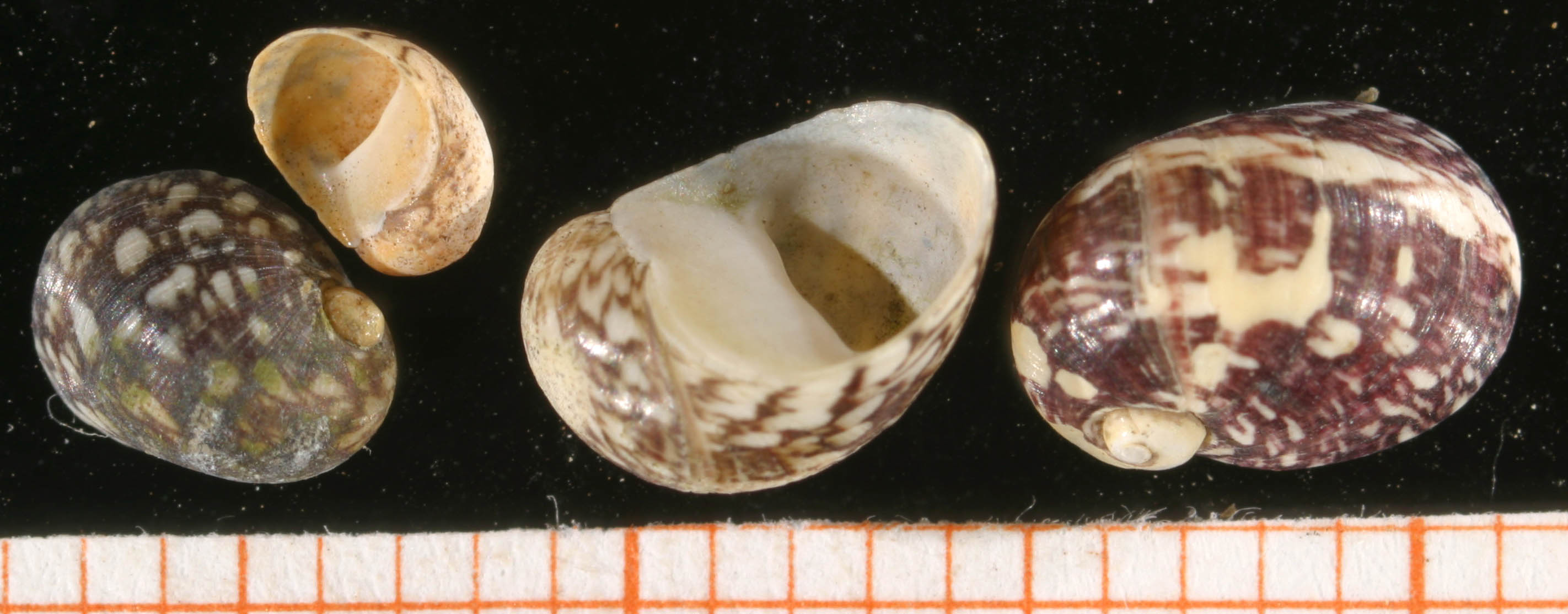
Family Neritidae, shells of Theodoxus fluviatilis.

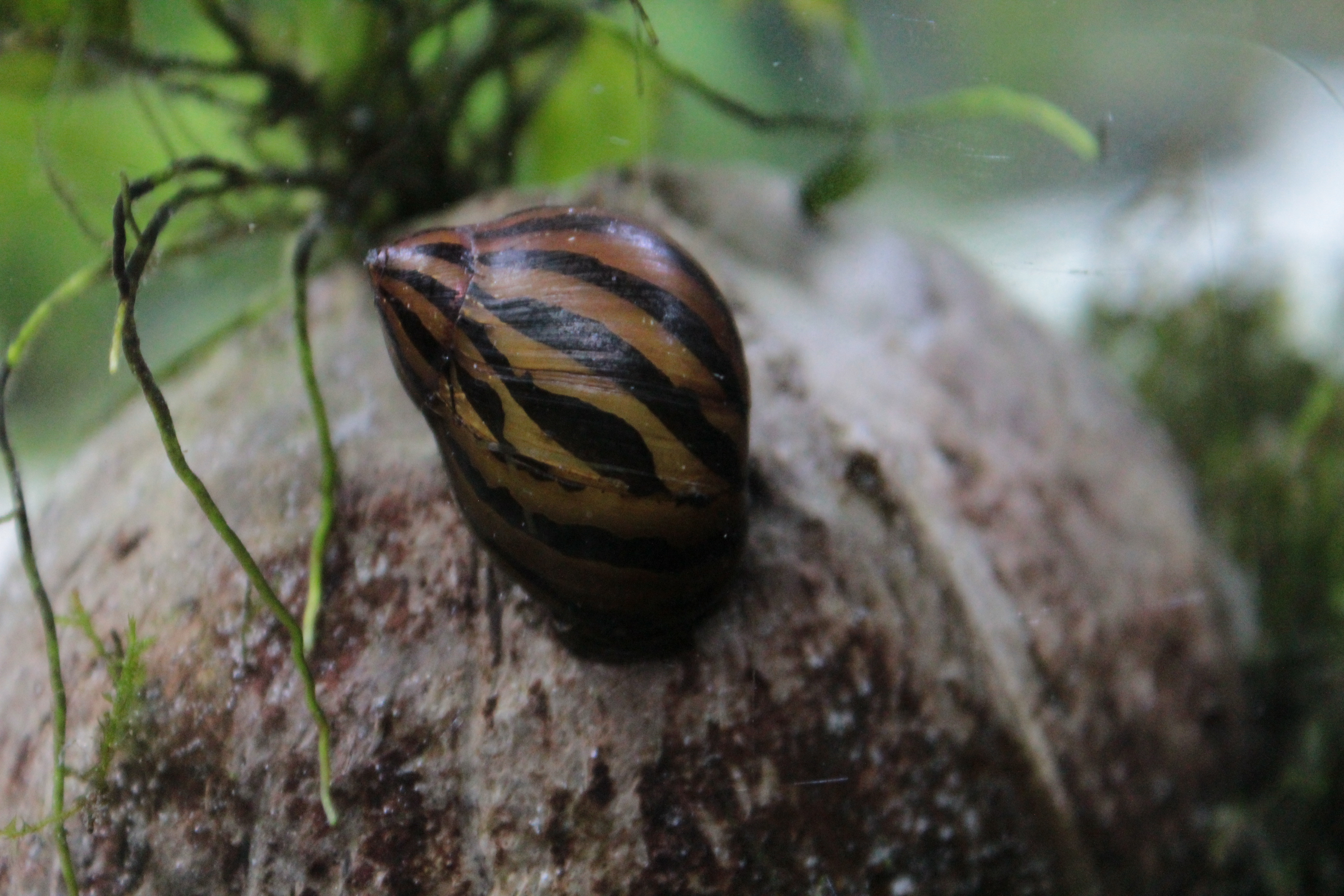
Family Neritidae, Vittina natalensis

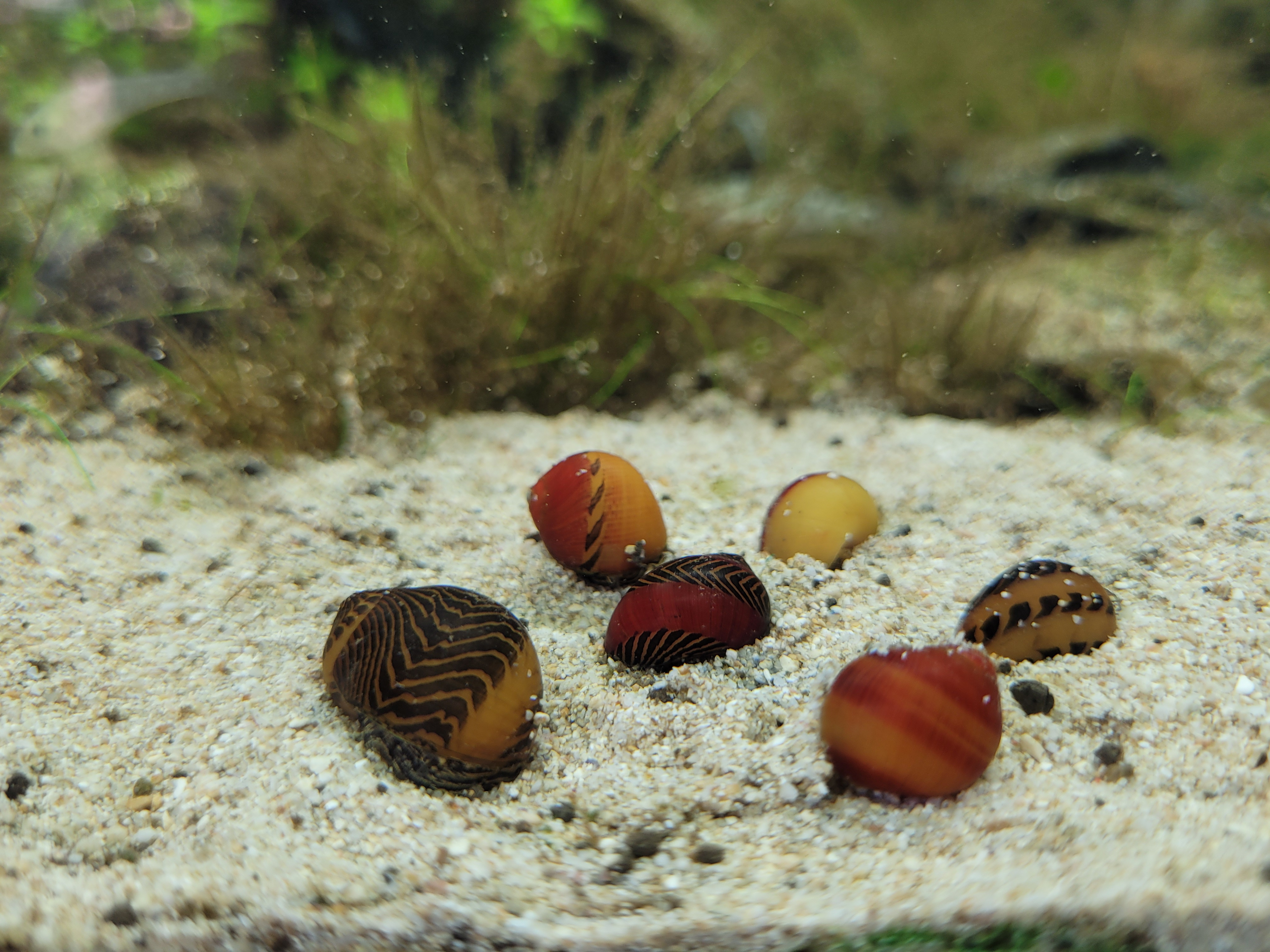
Family Neritidae, Vittina waigiensis

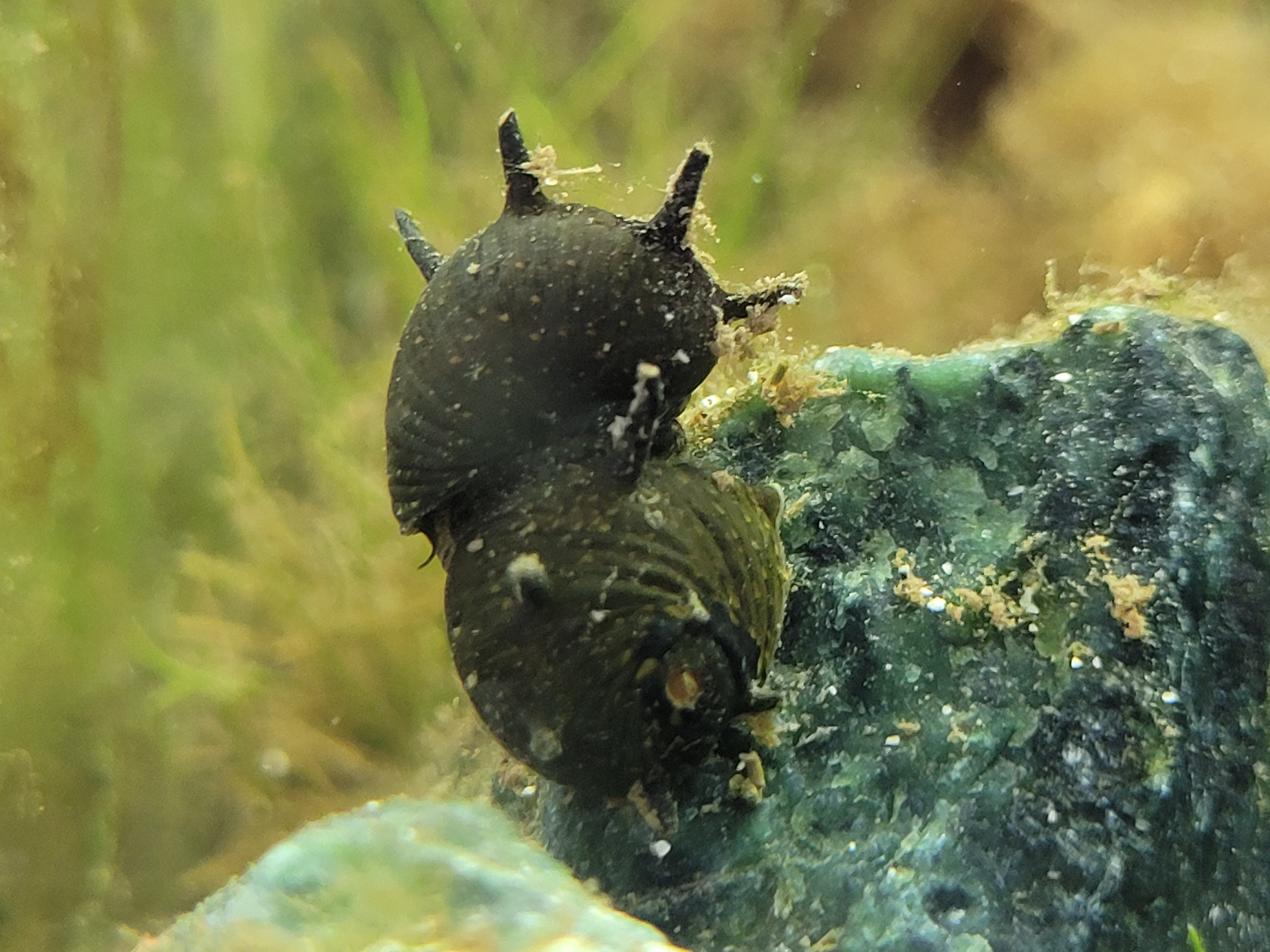
Family Neritidae, Clithon corona

=== Caenogastropoda ===
The Caenogastropoda are a large group of gilled operculate snails, which are largely marine. In freshwater habitats there are ten major families of caenogastropods, as well as several other families of lesser importance:

Architaenioglossa

- Ampullariidae — an exclusively freshwater family that is largely tropical and includes the large "apple snails" kept in aquaria. About 105–170 species.
- Viviparidae — medium to large snails, live-bearing, commonly referred to as "mystery snails". Worldwide except South America, and everywhere confined to fresh waters. About 125–150 species.
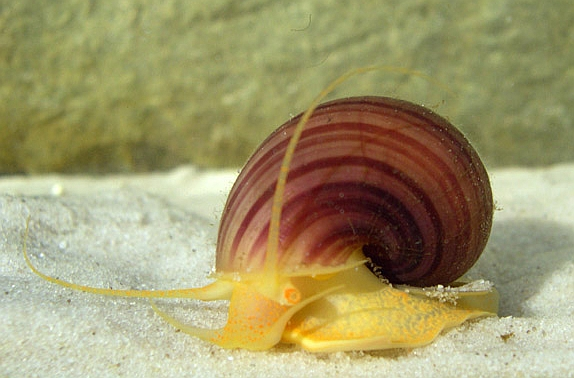
Family Ampullariidae, Pomacea bridgesii.

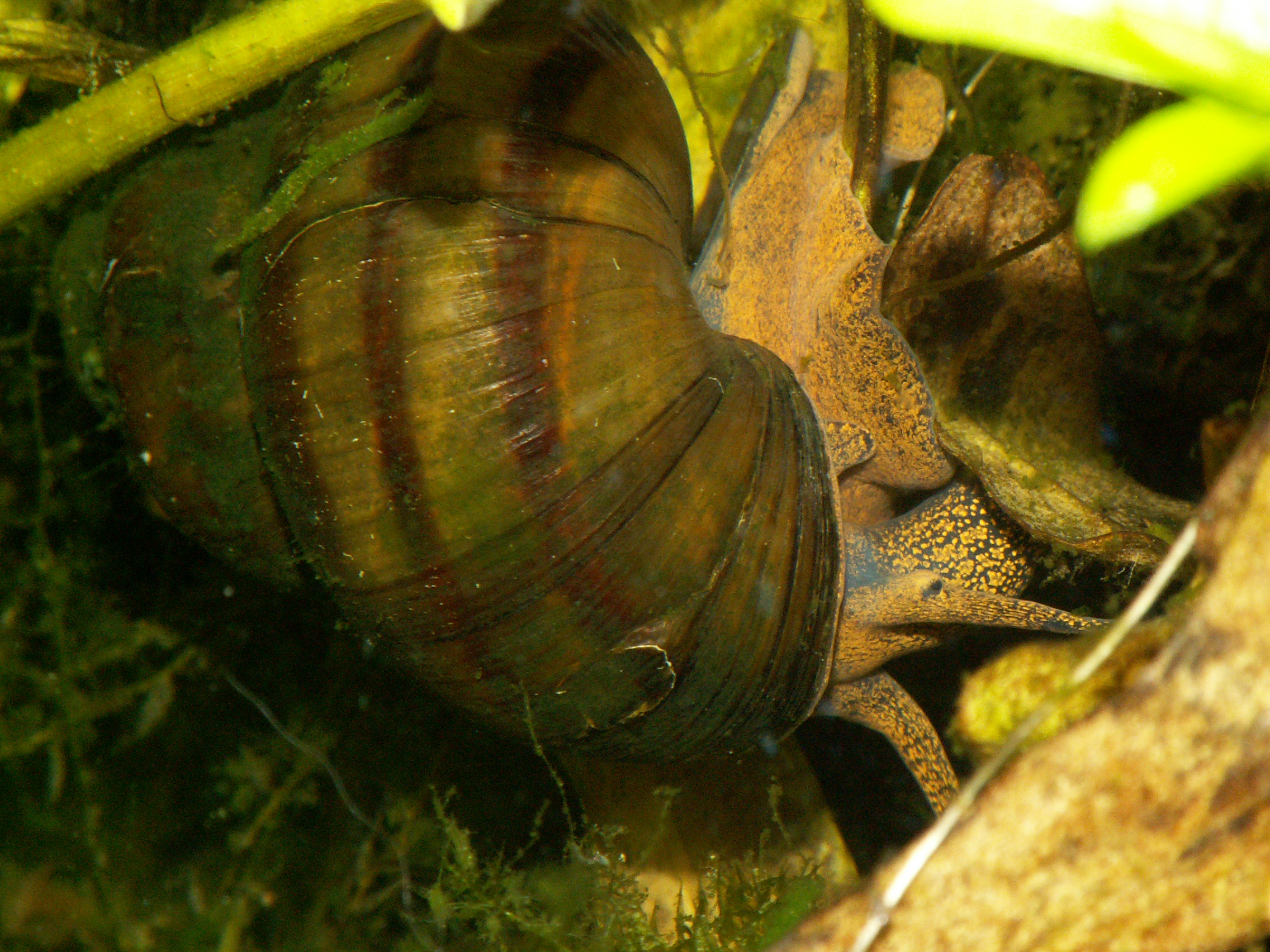
Family Viviparidae, Viviparus viviparus.

Sorbeoconcha

- Melanopsidae — family native to rivers draining to the Mediterranean, also Middle East, and some South Pacific islands. About 25–50 species.
- Pachychilidae — 165–225 species. native to South and Central America. Formerly included with the Pleuroceridae by many authors.
- Paludomidae — about 100 species in south Asia, diverse in African Lakes, and Sri Lanka. Formerly classified with the Pleuroceridae by some authors.
- Pleuroceridae — abundant and diverse in eastern North America, largely high-spired snails of small to large size. About 150 species.
- Semisulcospiridae — primarily eastern Asia, Japan, also the Juga snails of northwestern North America. Formerly included with the Pleuroceridae. About 50 species.
- Thiaridae — high-spired parthenogenic snails of the tropics, includes those referred to as "trumpet snails" in aquaria. About 110 species.
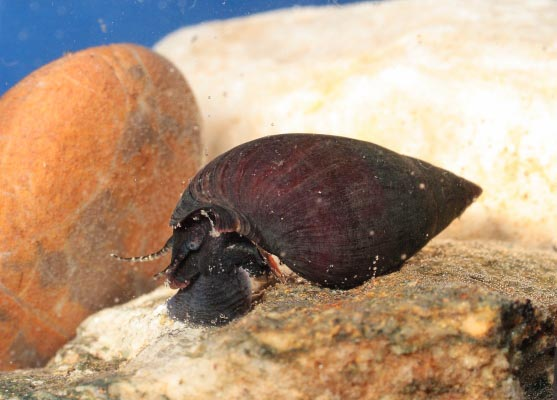
Family Melanopsidae, Melanopsis praemorsa

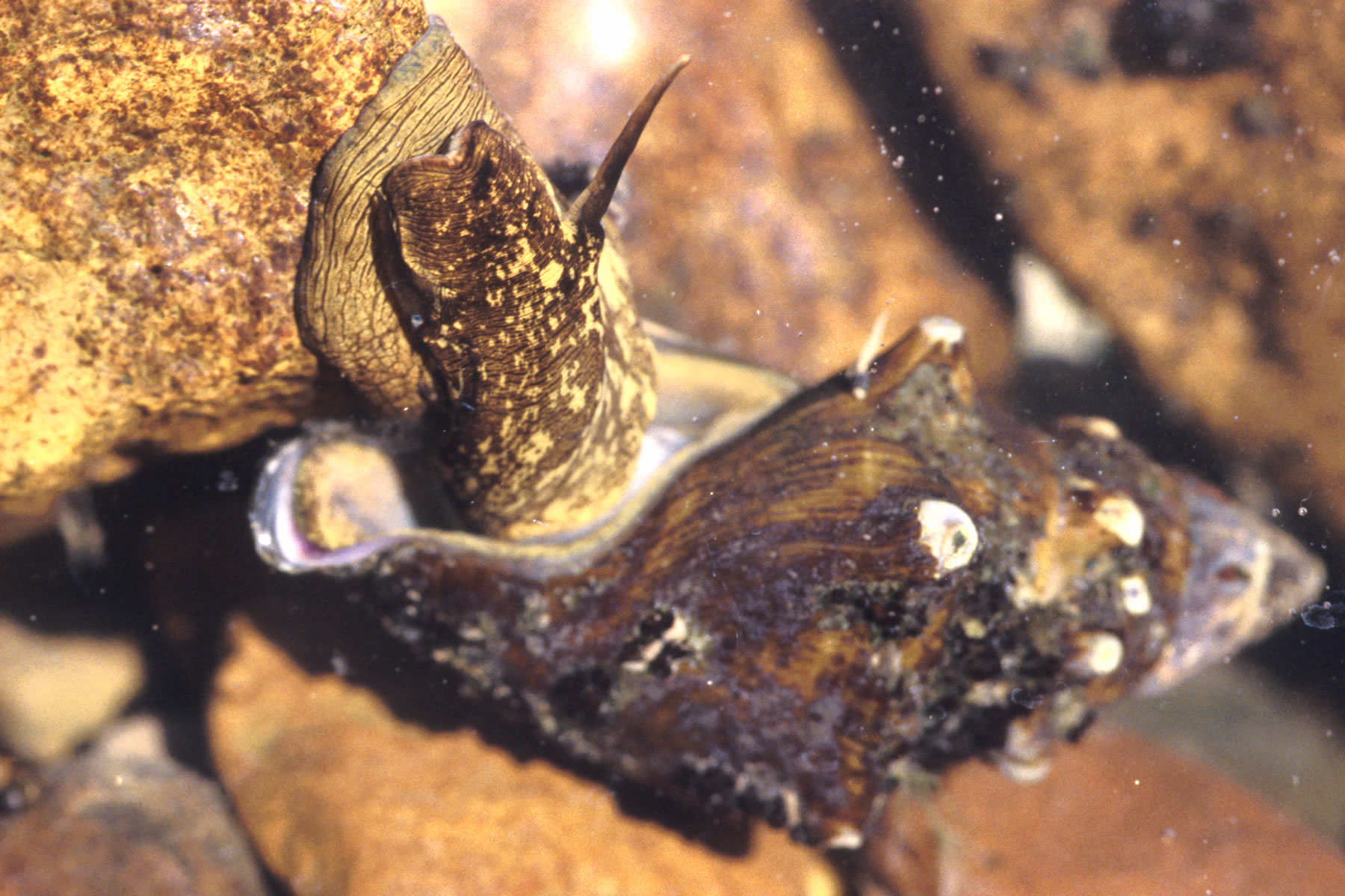
Family Pleuroceridae, Io fluvialis.

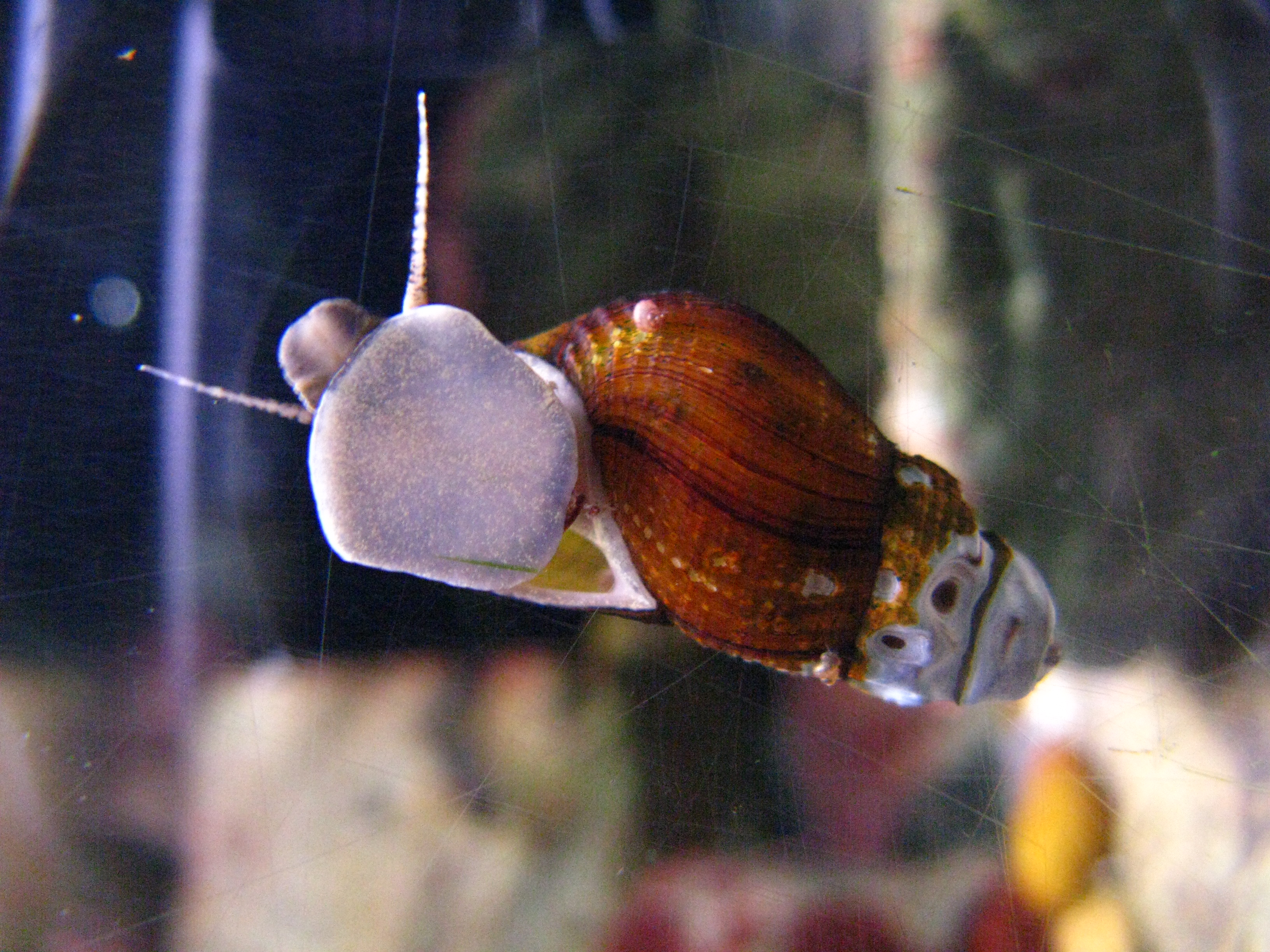
Family Semisulcospiridae, Semisulcospira kurodai.

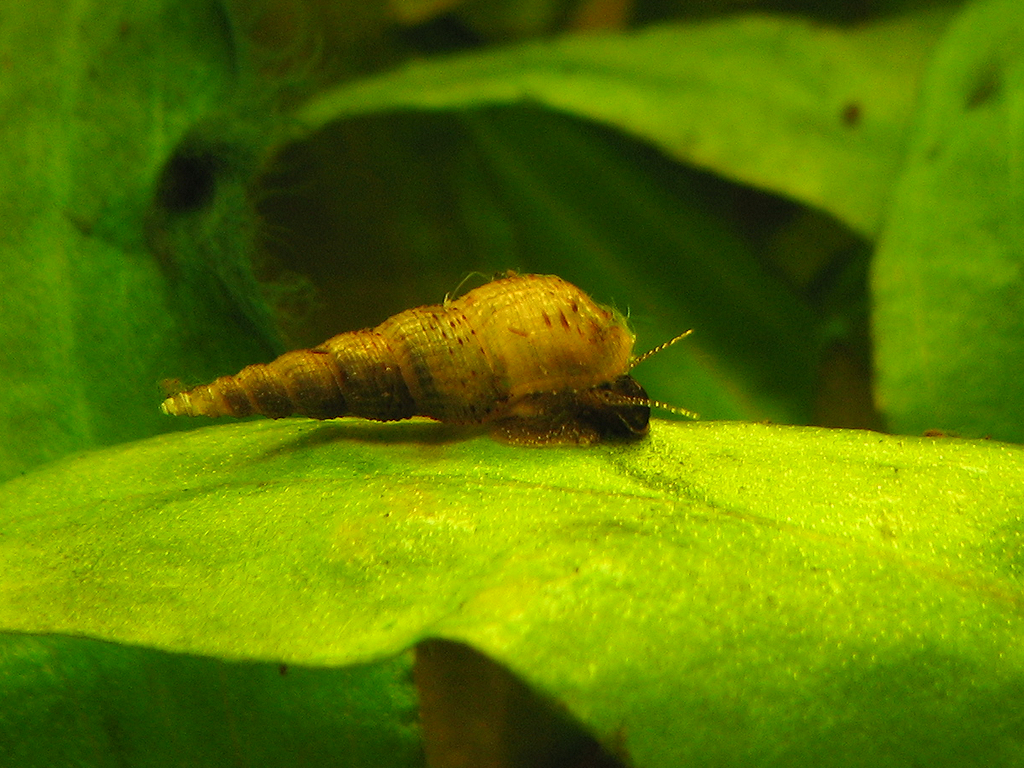
Family Thiaridae, Melanoides tuberculata.

Littorinimorpha

- Littorinidae — 9 species in the genus Cremnoconchus are freshwater living in streams and waterfalls. Other species are marine.
- Amnicolidae — about 200 species.
- Assimineidae — about 20 freshwater species, other are marine
- Bithyniidae — small snails, native to Eastern Hemisphere. About 130 species.
- Cochliopidae — about 246 species.
- Helicostoidae — the only species Helicostoa sinensis lives in China.
- Hydrobiidae — small to very small snails found worldwide. About 1250 freshwater species other are marine.
- Lithoglyphidae — about 100 species.
- Moitessieriidae — about 55 species.
- Pomatiopsidae — small amphibious snails scattered worldwide, most diverse in eastern and Southeast Asia. About 170 species.
- Stenothyridae — about 60 freshwater species, others are marine.
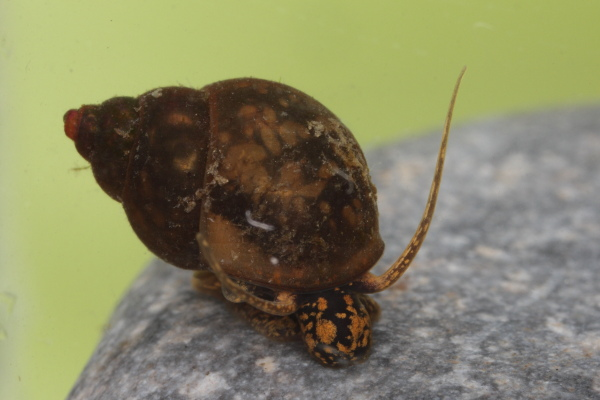
Family Bithyniidae, Bithynia tentaculata.

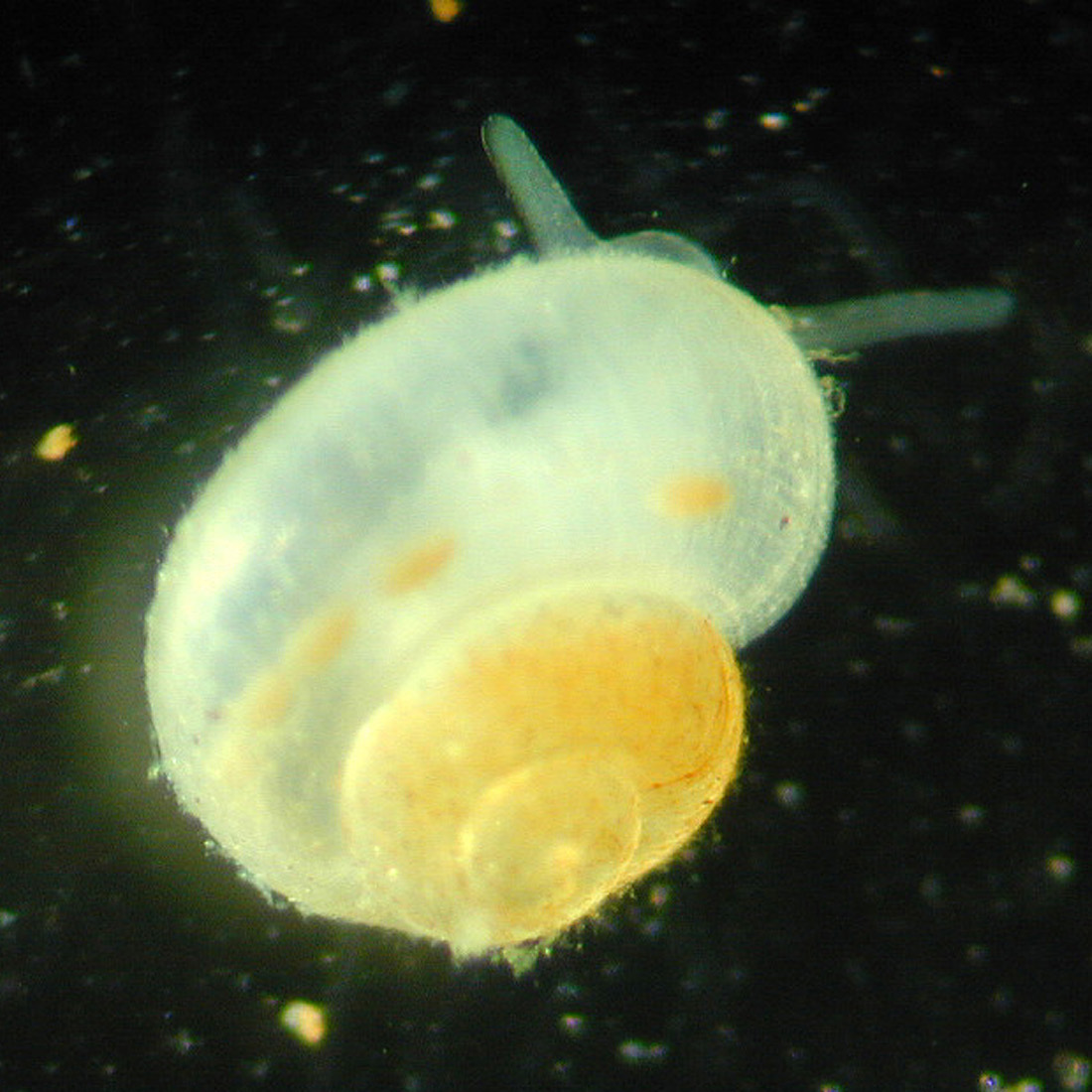
Family Cochliopidae, Antrobia culveri.

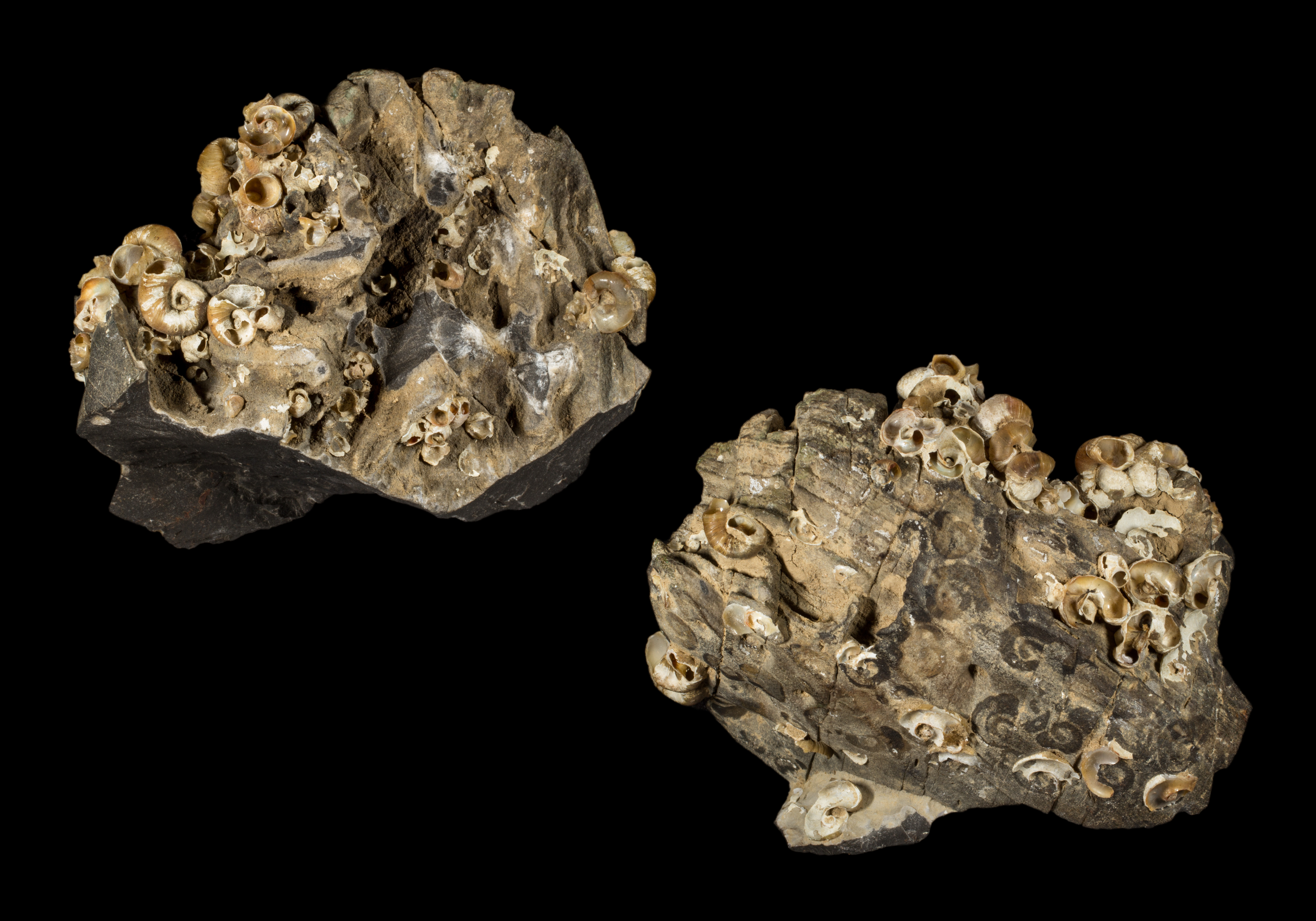
Family Helicostoidae, Helicostoa sinensis shells.

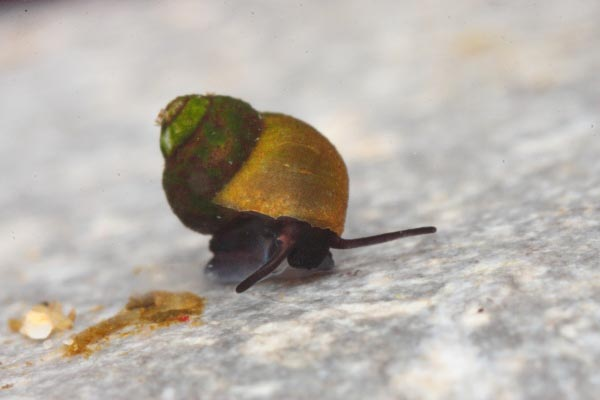
Family Hydrobiidae, Sadleriana fluminensis

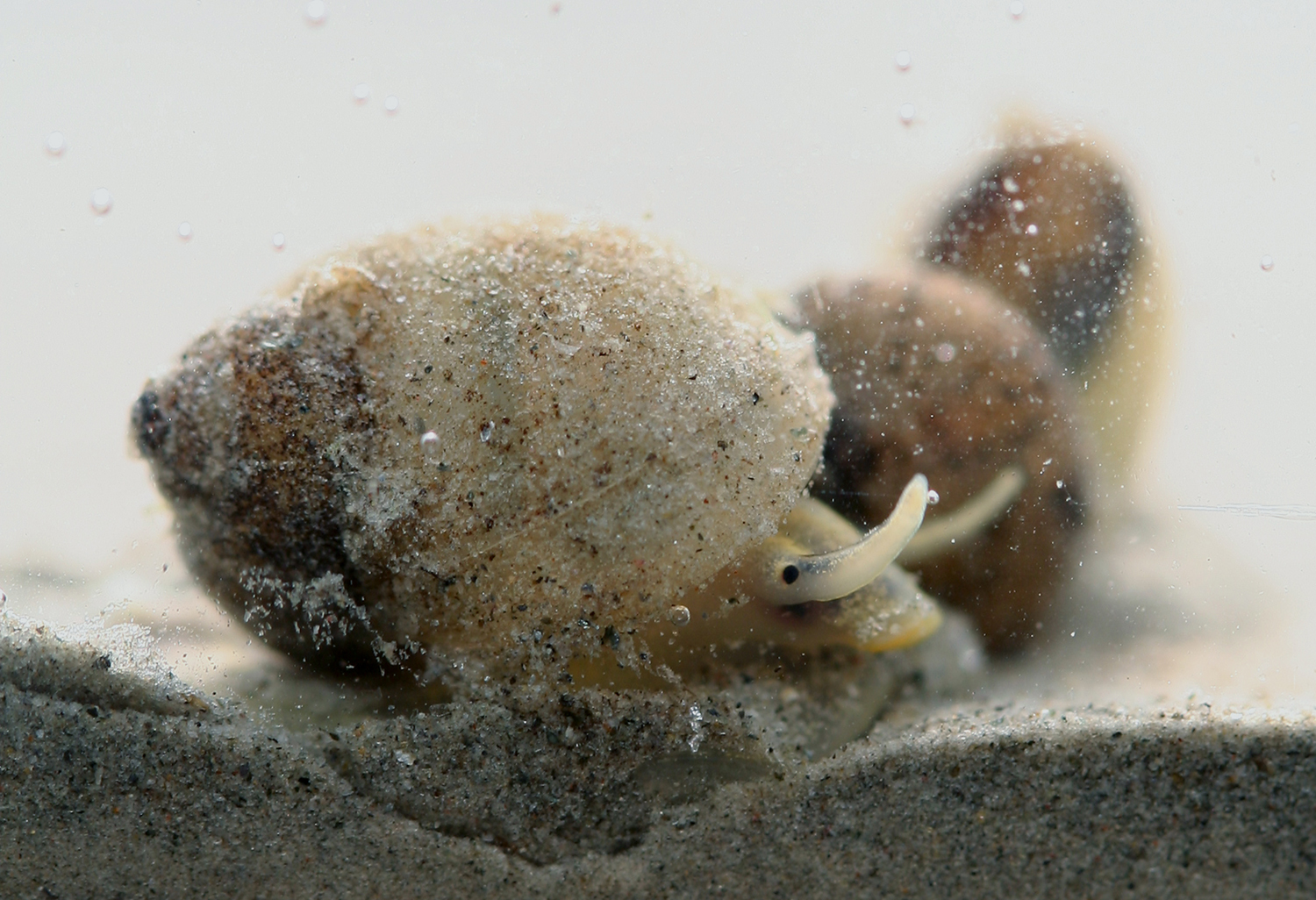
Family Lithoglyphidae, Lithoglyphus naticoides.

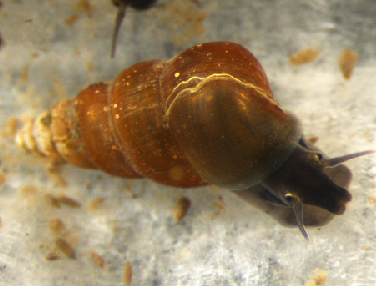
Family Pomatiopsidae, Oncomelania hupensis.

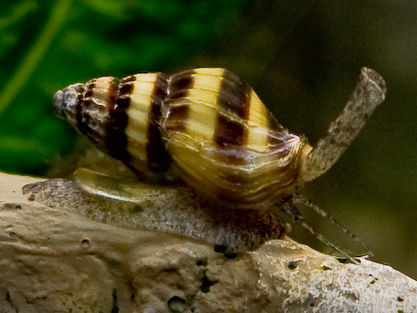
Anentome helena, family Nassariidae.

Neogastropoda

- Nassariidae — 8–10 freshwater species in the genus Anentome and Clea, native to Southeast Asia. Other Nassariidae are marine.
- Marginellidae — 2 freshwater species in the genus Rivomarginella, native to Southeast Asia. Other Marginellidae are marine.

=== Heterobranchia ===
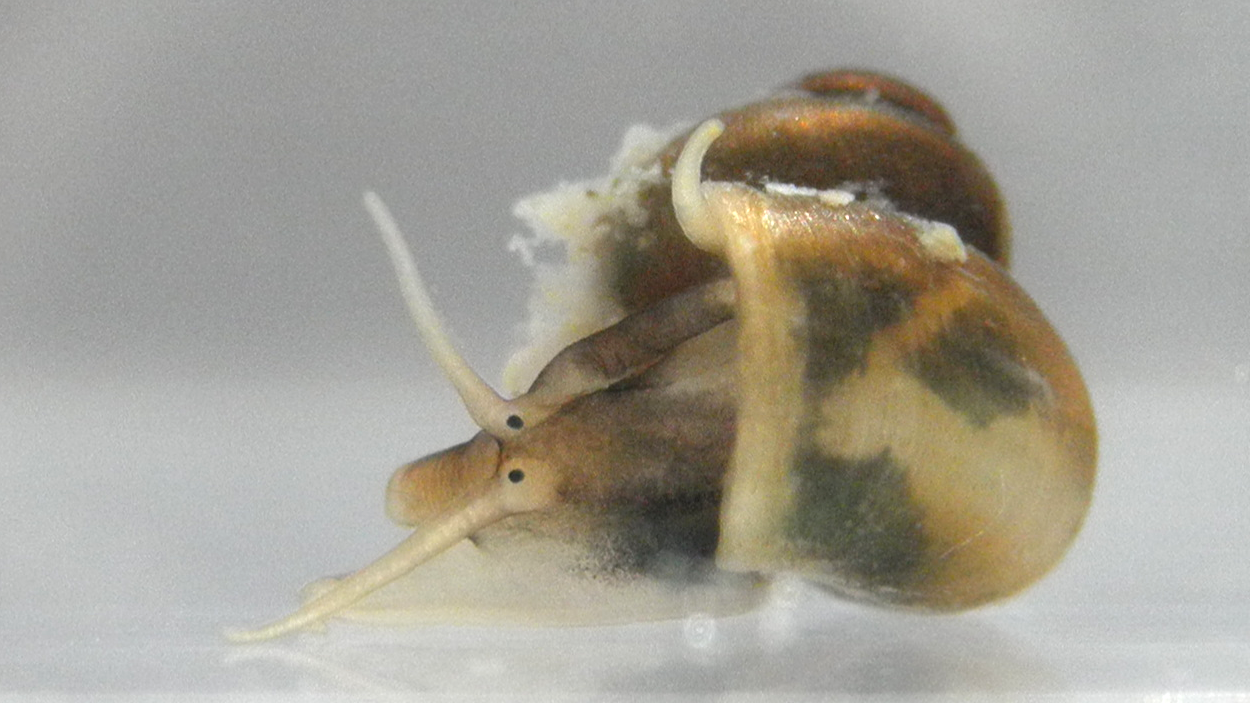
Family Valvatidae, Valvata piscinalis.

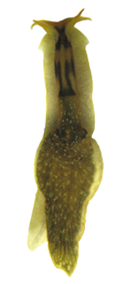
Acochlidium fijiiensis is one of very few freshwater gastropods without a shell.

Lower Heterobranchia

- Glacidorbidae — 20 species.
- Valvatidae — small low-spired snails referred to as "valve snails". 71 species.

Acochlidiacea

- Acochlidiidae (including synonym Strubelliidae) — 5 shell-less species: Acochlidium amboinense, Acochlidium bayerfehlmanni, Acochlidium fijiiensis, Palliohedyle sutteri and Strubellia paradoxa
- Tantulidae — there is only one species which is shell-less Tantulum elegans.

Pulmonata, Basommatophora

Basommatophorans are pulmonate or air-breathing aquatic snails, characterized by having their eyes located at the base of their tentacles, rather than at the tips, as in the true land snails Stylommatophora. The majority of basommatophorans have shells that are thin, translucent, and relatively colorless, and all five freshwater basommatophoran families lack an operculum.

- Chilinidae — small to medium-sized snails confined to temperate and cold South America. About 15 species.
- Latiidae — small limpet-like snails confined to New Zealand. One or three species.
- Acroloxidae — about 40 species.
- Lymnaeidae — found worldwide, but are most numerous in temperate and northern regions. These are the dextral (right-handed) pond snails. About 100 species.
- Planorbidae — "rams horn" snails, with a worldwide distribution. About 250 species.
- Physidae — left-handed (sinistral) "pouch snails", native to Europe, Asia, North America. About 80 species.
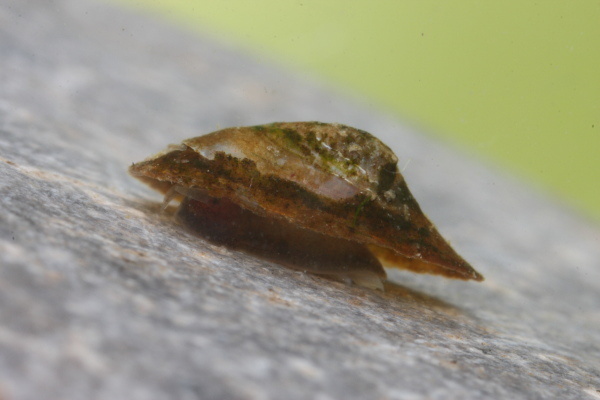
Family Acroloxidae, Acroloxus lacustris.

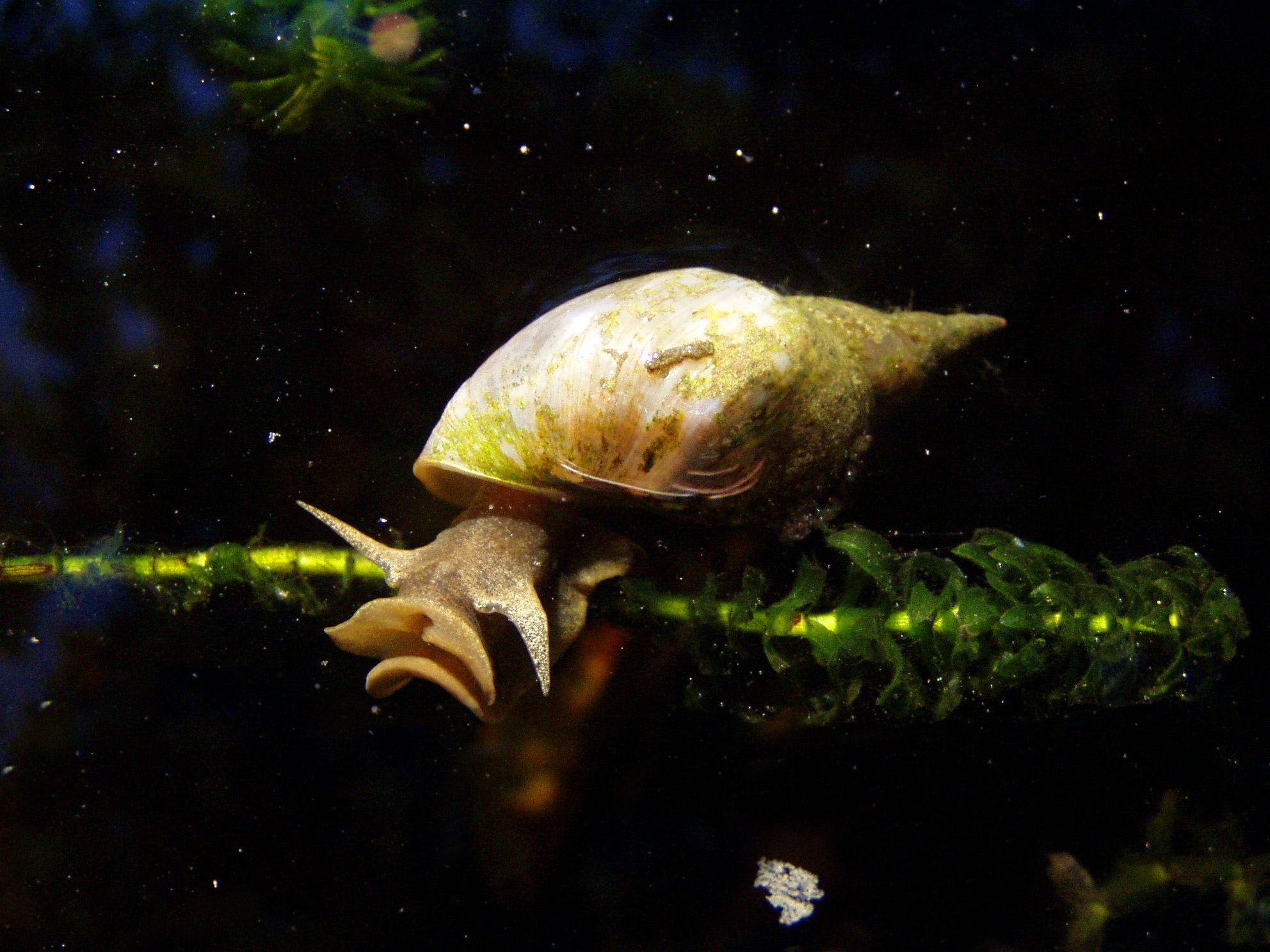
Family Lymnaeidae, Lymnaea stagnalis.

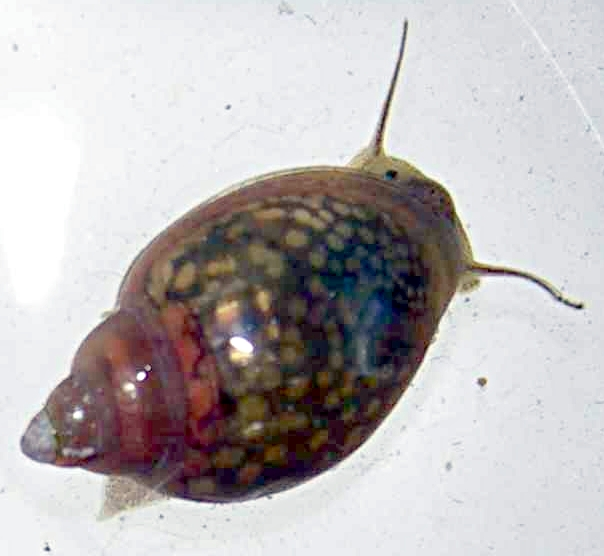
Family Physidae, Physella acuta.

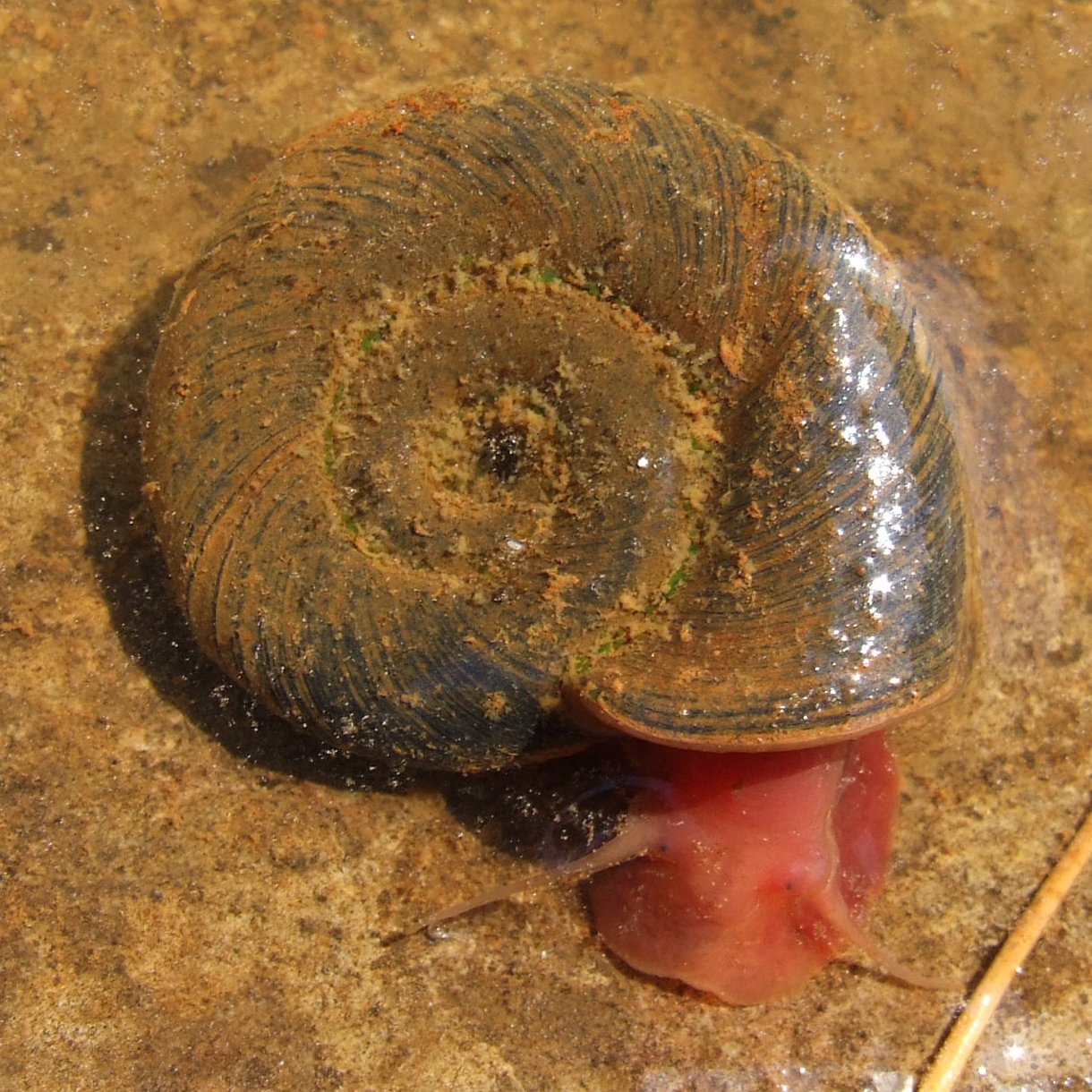
Family Planorbidae, Planorbarius corneus.

== Sexual reproduction and self-fertilization ==
The freshwater snail Physa acuta is in the subclass Heterobranchia and the family Physidae. P. acuta is a self-fertile snail that can undergo either sexual reproduction or self-fertilization. experimentally tested whether accumulation of deleterious mutations is avoided either by inbreeding populations of the snail (undergoing self-fertilization), or in outbreeding populations undergoing sexual reproduction. Inbreeding promotes the homozygous expression of deleterious recessive mutations in progeny that then exposes these mutations to selective elimination because of their deleterious affects on progeny. Outbreeding sexual reproduction allows females to choose male mating partners with smaller mutation loads that then also leads to a reduction of deleterious mutations in progeny. On the basis of their findings, Noel et al. concluded that both outbred and inbred populations of P. acuta can efficiently eliminate deleterious mutations.

== As human food ==
Several different freshwater snail species are eaten in Asian cuisine.

Archaeological investigations in Guatemala have revealed that the diet of the Maya of the Classic Period (AD 250–900) included freshwater snails.

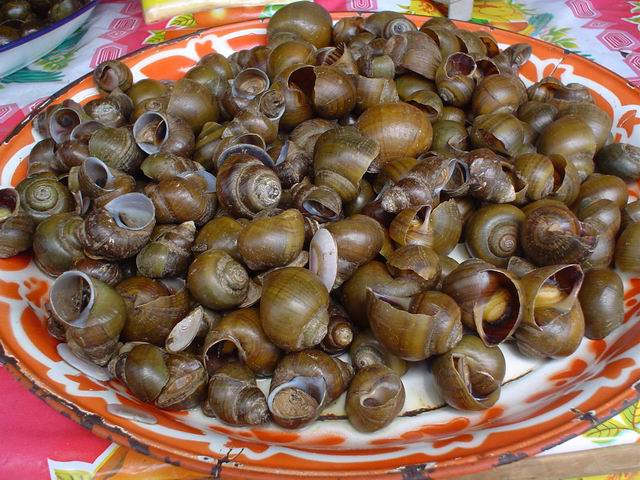
A dish of cooked freshwater snails, ampullariids and viviparids from Poipet, Cambodia

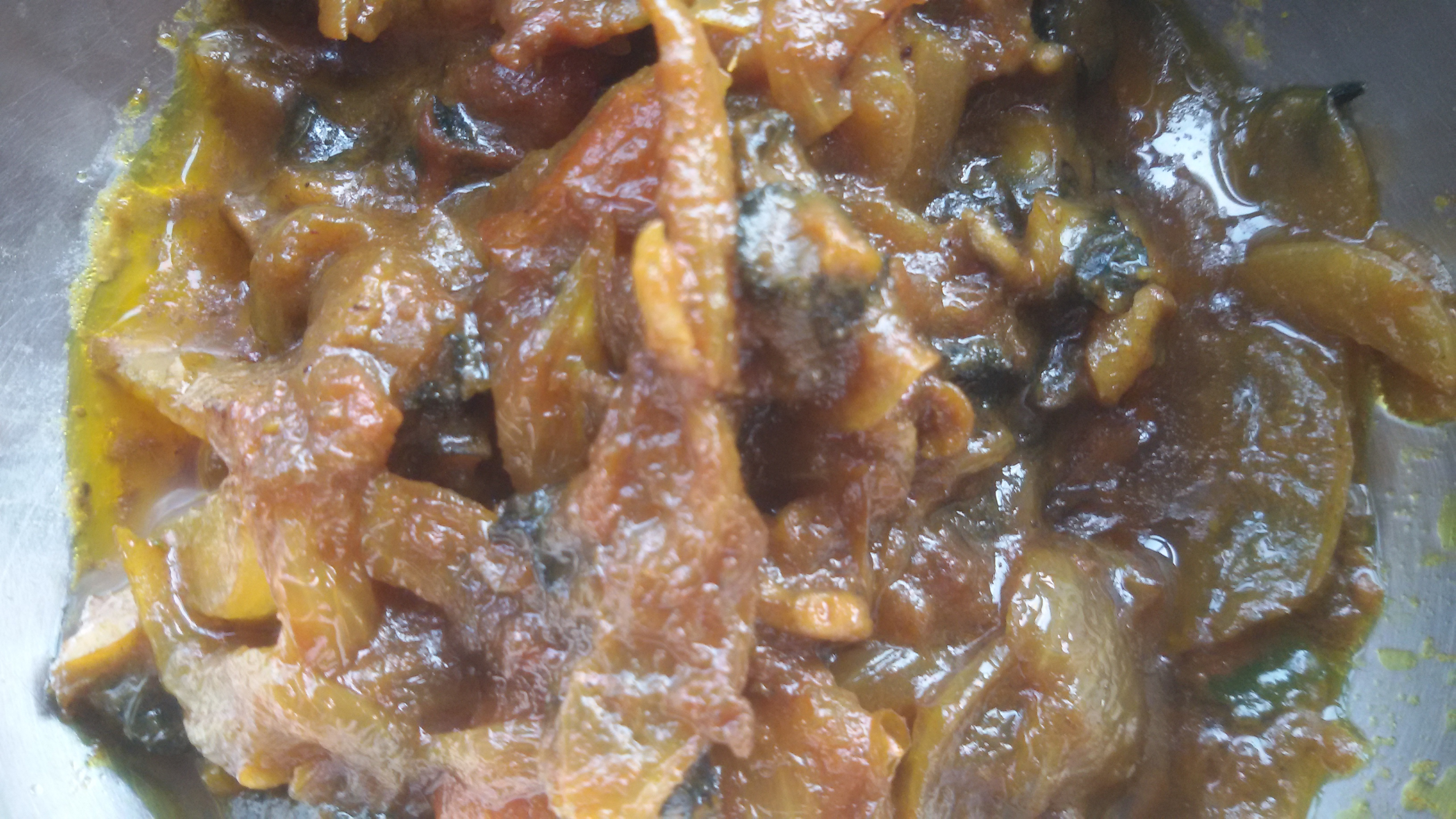
A Bengali dish of stir-fried freshwater snails with onion and garlic paste and other spices, from Kolkata, West Bengal, India

== Aquarium snails ==
Freshwater snails are commonly found in aquaria along with tropical fish. Species available vary in different parts of the world. In the United States, commonly available species include ramshorn snails such as Planorbella duryi, bladder snails such as Physella acuta, apple snails such as Pomacea bridgesii, the high-spired thiarid Malaysian trumpet snail, Melanoides tuberculata, and several Neritina species.

== Parasitology ==
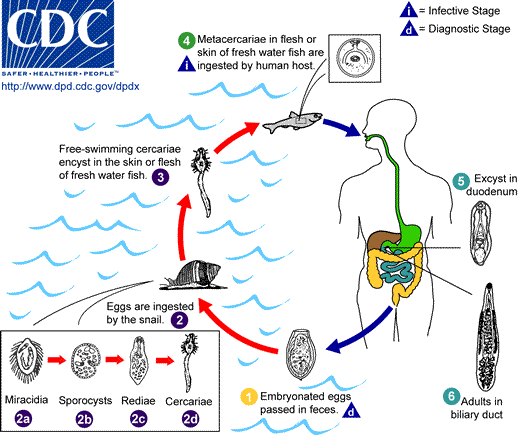
Life cycle of two liver fluke species which have freshwater snails as intermediate hosts

Freshwater snails are widely known to be hosts in the lifecycles of a variety of human and animal parasites, particularly trematodes (or "flukes"). Some of these relations for prosobranch snails include Oncomelania in the family Pomatiopsidae as hosts of Schistosoma, and Bithynia, Parafossarulus and Amnicola as hosts of Opisthorchis. Thiara and Semisulcospira may host Paragonimus. Juga plicifera may host Nanophyetus salmincola. Basommatophoran snails are even more widely infected, with many Biomphalaria (Planorbidae) serving as hosts for Schistosoma mansoni, Fasciolopsis and other parasitic groups. The tiny Bulinus snails are hosts for Schistosoma haematobium. Lymnaeid snails (Lymnaeidae) serve as hosts for Fasciola and the cercariae causing swimmer's itch. The term "neglected tropical diseases" applies to all snail-borne infections, including schistosomiasis, fascioliasis, fasciolopsiasis, paragonimiasis, opisthorchiasis, clonorchiasis, and angiostrongyliasis.

== See also ==
- Terrestrial molluscs
- Land snail
- Land slug
- Sea snail
- Sea slug
