= Neorickettsia sennetsu =

Ehrlichiaceae

Scientific classification
- Domain: Bacteria
- Kingdom: Pseudomonadati
- Phylum: Pseudomonadota
- Class: Alphaproteobacteria
- Subclass: "Rickettsidae"
- Order: Rickettsiales
- Family: Anaplasmataceae
- Genus: Neorickettsia
- Species: N. sennetsu

Binomial name
- Neorickettsia sennetsu (Misao and Kobayashi 1956) Dumler et al. 2001

Synonyms
- Rickettsia sennetsu Misao and Kobayashi 1956 (Approved Lists 1980); Ehrlichia sennetsu (Misao and Kobayashi 1956) Ristic and Huxsoll 1984

Species of bacterium

Neorickettsia sennetsu is a Gram-negative bacterium that causes Sennetsu ehrlichiosis. N. sennetsu is thought to be contracted by eating raw fish.

Genomic data suggests that N. sennetsu is more closely related to N. risticii than N. helminthoeca.

== See also ==
- Neorickettsia risticii
