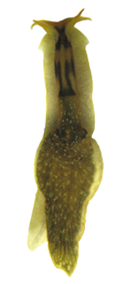
- Acochlidium fijiiensis

Scientific classification
- Kingdom: Animalia
- Phylum: Mollusca
- Class: Gastropoda
- Family: Acochlidiidae
- Genus: Acochlidium; Strubell, 1892

= Acochlidium =

Genus of gastropods

Acochlidium is a genus of freshwater slugs, aquatic gastropod molluscs in the family Acochlidiidae.

== Species ==
Species within the genus Acochlidium include:

- Acochlidium amboinense Strubell, 1892
- Acochlidium bayerfehlmanni Wawra, 1980
- Acochlidium fijiiensis Haynes & Kenchington, 1991

synonyms:

- Acochlidium paradoxum Strubell is a synonym for Strubellia paradoxa (Strubell, 1892)
- Acochlidium sutteri Wawra is a synonym for Palliohedyle sutteri
- Acochlidium weberi Bergh, 1896 is a synonym for Palliohedyle weberi
