= Juga silicula =

Scientific classification
- Kingdom: Animalia
- Phylum: Mollusca
- Class: Gastropoda
- Subclass: Caenogastropoda
- Order: incertae sedis
- Family: Semisulcospiridae
- Genus: Juga
- Species: J. silicula

Binomial name
- Juga silicula (Gould, 1847)

Synonyms
- Melania silicula (Gould); Goniobasis silicula (Lea, 1862)

Species of gastropod

Juga silicula, common name glassy juga, is a small, freshwater snail found lotic water in Washington, Oregon, and northern California. It is dark reddish-brown in color with an ovate operculum and about 3.5 whorls.

Historically, J. silicula was abundant in its range. It is currently considered a species of concern in Washington due to limited range, habitat degradation and anthropogenic factors.

J. silicula acts as a first intermediate host for the trematode parasite Cephalouterina dicamptodoni.
