= Palliohedyle =

Scientific classification
- Kingdom: Animalia
- Phylum: Mollusca
- Class: Gastropoda
- Family: Acochlidiidae
- Genus: Palliohedyle; Rankin, 1979

Genus of gastropods

Palliohedyle is a genus of gastropods belonging to the family Acochlidiidae.

Species:

- Palliohedyle sutteri (Wawra, 1979)
- Palliohedyle weberi (Bergh, 1895)
