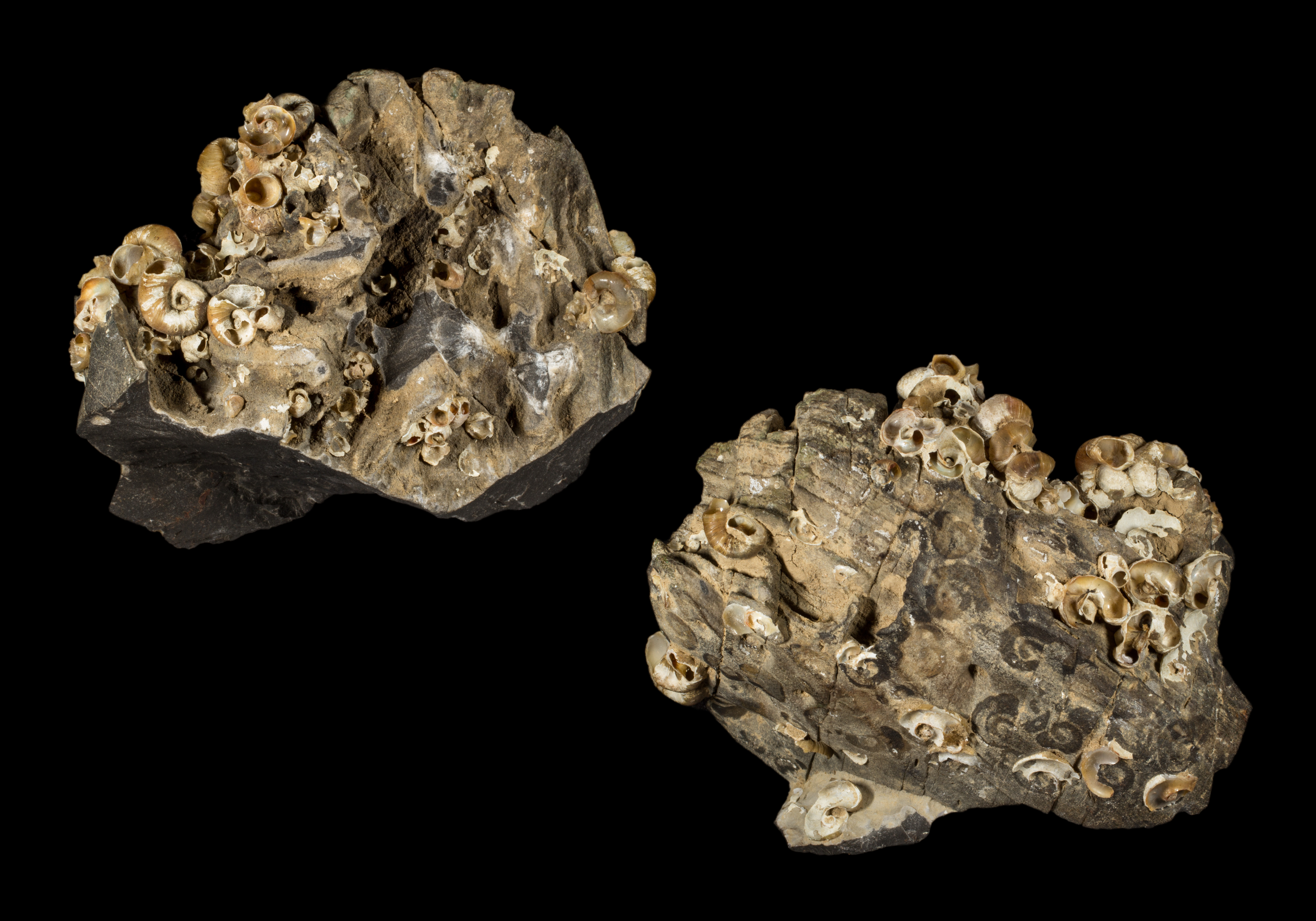
- Syntypes of Helicostoa sinensis.

Scientific classification
- Kingdom: Animalia
- Phylum: Mollusca
- Class: Gastropoda
- (unranked): clade Caenogastropoda clade Hypsogastropoda clade Littorinimorpha
- Superfamily: Truncatelloidea
- Family: Helicostoidae Pruvot-Fol, 1937
- Genus: Helicostoa Lamy, 1926
- Species: H. sinensis

Binomial name
- Helicostoa sinensis Lamy, 1926

= Helicostoa =

Genus of mollusc

Helicostoa is a monotypic genus of freshwater snail, an aquatic gastropod mollusc in the order Littorinimorpha containing the single species Helicostoa sinensis.

Helicostoa is also the only genus in the family Helicostoidae. According to taxonomy of the Gastropoda by Bouchet & Rocroi (2005) the family Helicostoidae has no subfamilies.

Helicostoa sinensis was previously tentatively placed within the superfamily Rissooidea. and before that it was in the superfamily Vermetoidea.

Helicostoa sinensis is only found in China, more specifically in the Yangtze River.

This freshwater snail lives attached or bonded to blocks of limestone.
