= Acochlidium amboinense =

Scientific classification
- Domain: Eukaryota
- Kingdom: Animalia
- Phylum: Mollusca
- Class: Gastropoda
- Family: Acochlidiidae
- Genus: Acochlidium
- Species: A. amboinense

Binomial name
- Acochlidium amboinense Strubell, 1892

Species of gastropod

Acochlidium amboinense is a species of freshwater gastropod, an aquatic gastropod mollusc within the family Acochlidiidae.
