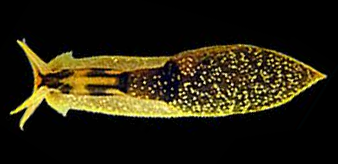
- dorsal view of Acochlidium bayerfehlmanni

Scientific classification
- Domain: Eukaryota
- Kingdom: Animalia
- Phylum: Mollusca
- Class: Gastropoda
- Family: Acochlidiidae
- Genus: Acochlidium
- Species: A. bayerfehlmanni

Binomial name
- Acochlidium bayerfehlmanni Wawra, 1980

= Acochlidium bayerfehlmanni =

Species of gastropod

Acochlidium bayerfehlmanni is a species of freshwater gastropod, an aquatic gastropod mollusc within the family Acochlidiidae.

The specific name bayerfehlmanni is in honour of Frederick Merkle Bayer and of Herman Adair Fehlmann, who made the research of Acochlidium on Palau. Type specimen are stored in Natural History Museum, Vienna and in Natural History Museum of Basel.

== Distribution ==
The type locality is Arakitoach River, Babelthuap, Palau Islands.

== Description ==
Acochlidium bayerfehlmanni has no shell. The body length is 25 mm. It has two pairs of tentacles.

It is a hermaphrodite.
