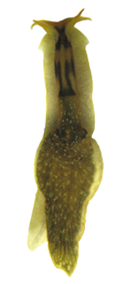
- A live individual of Acochlidium fijiiensis

Scientific classification
- Kingdom: Animalia
- Phylum: Mollusca
- Class: Gastropoda
- Subclass: Heterobranchia
- Infraclass: Euthyneura
- Subterclass: Tectipleura
- Superorder: Acochlidiimorpha
- Superfamily: Acochlidioidea
- Family: Acochlidiidae; Küthe, 1935

Diversity
- Altogether 3 genera and 6 species; 5 freshwater species, one in brackish waters

Synonyms
- Palliohedylidae Rankin, 1979

= Acochlidiidae =

Family of gastropods

Acochlidiidae are a taxonomic family of shell-less freshwater gastropods (one of them Palliohedyle weberi lives in brackish water), aquatic gastropod mollusks within the clade Acochlidiacea.

== 2005 taxonomy ==
Acochlidiidae was classified as the only family within the superfamily Acochlidioidea Küthe, 1935 in the taxonomy of Bouchet & Rocroi (2005). Palliohedylidae was in turn classified as the only family within the superfamily Palliohedyloidea.

== 2010 taxonomy ==
Schrödl & Neusser (2010) redefined the taxonomy of Acochlidiacea in 2010, placing the family Acochlidiidae in the clade Hedylopsacea.

== Genera ==
According to Schrödl & Neusser (2010), there are three genera in the family Acochlidiidae:

Acochlidium Strubell, 1892

- Acochlidium amboinense Strubell, 1892
- Acochlidium bayerfehlmanni Wawra, 1980
- Acochlidium fijiiensis Haynes & Kenchington, 1991

Palliohedyle Rankin, 1979

- Palliohedyle sutteri - synonym: Acochlidium sutteri Wawra
- Palliohedyle weberi - synonym: Acochlidium weberi Bergh, 1896

Strubellia Odhner, 1937

- Strubellia paradoxa (Strubell, 1892) - synonym: Acochlidium paradoxum Strubell
- Strubellia wawrai Brenzinger, Neusser, Jörger & Schrödl, 2011

Wallacellia Brenzinger, Glaubrecht, Jörger, Schrödl & Neusser, 2021

- Wallacellia siputbiru Brenzinger, Glaubrecht, Jörger, Schrödl & Neusser, 2021
