= Neorickettsia helminthoeca =

Scientific classification
- Domain: Bacteria
- Kingdom: Pseudomonadati
- Phylum: Pseudomonadota
- Class: Alphaproteobacteria
- Subclass: "Rickettsidae"
- Order: Rickettsiales
- Family: Anaplasmataceae
- Genus: Neorickettsia
- Species: N. helminthoeca

Binomial name
- Neorickettsia helminthoeca Philip et al. 1953

Synonyms
- Neorickettsia hemintheca [sic] Philip et al. 1953

Species of bacterium

Neorickettsia helminthoeca is a bacterium in the Neorickettsia genus that causes salmon poisoning disease.

== Salmon poisoning disease ==
Salmon poisoning disease (SPD) is a fatal disease of dogs and other canids caused by a rickettsial bacterium, Neorickettsia helminthoeca. It results from eating raw salmon, trout, or salamander and is common in the Pacific Northwest. These fish and amphibians are infected with the larvae of a fluke, Nanophyetus salmincola through an intermediate host, the snail Juga plicifera (Oxytrema is an obsolete genus). The larvae attach to the intestine of the dog and the rickettsial bacteria are released, causing severe gastrointestinal disease and systemic infection.

Neorickettsia elokominica, carried by the same fluke, causes a similar disease known as Elokomin fluke fever (EFF) in canids, bears, raccoons, and ferrets.

== Symptoms ==
Symptoms of SPD begin about one week after eating the salmon and include vomiting, diarrhea, loss of appetite, depression, high fever, and enlarged lymph nodes. Untreated, mortality reaches 90 percent. Death occurs seven to ten days after symptoms begin.

EFF has less severe symptoms than SPD, with less gastrointestinal signs and more lymph node involvement. The mortality in untreated cases is about 10 percent.

A similar disease has been identified in Brazil.

== Diagnosis ==
Diagnosis is through finding the fluke eggs microscopically in a stool sample. A needle aspiration biopsy of an enlarged lymph node will reveal rickettsial organisms within macrophages in many cases. The rickettsial infection can be successfully treated with tetracycline, and the fluke infection can be treated with fenbendazole.
