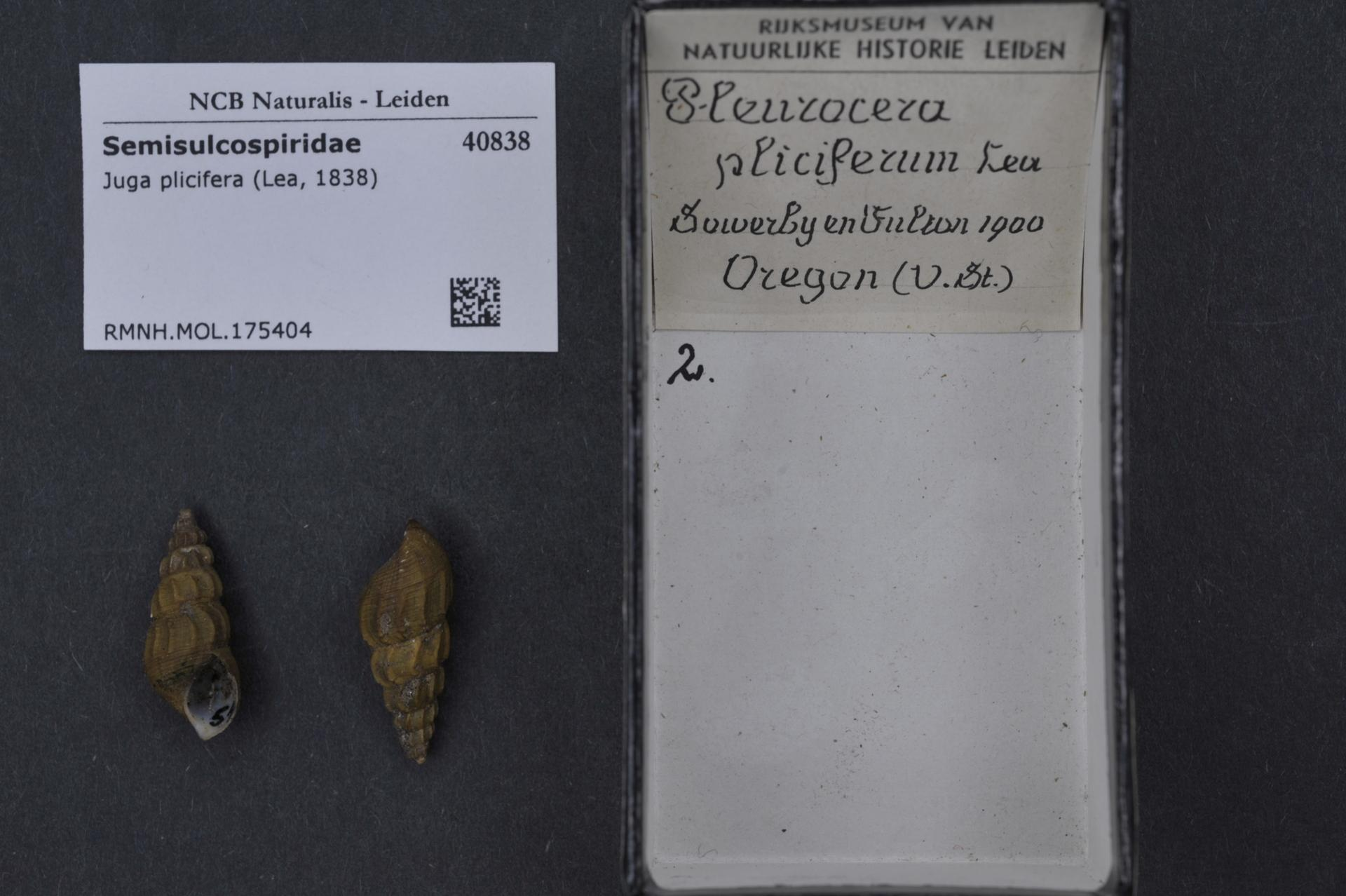
- Shells at the Naturalis Biodiversity Center

Scientific classification
- Kingdom: Animalia
- Phylum: Mollusca
- Class: Gastropoda
- Subclass: Caenogastropoda
- Order: incertae sedis
- Family: Semisulcospiridae
- Genus: Juga
- Species: J. plicifera

Binomial name
- Juga plicifera (I. Lea, 1838)

Synonyms
- Goniobasis plicifera (I. Lea, 1838); Oxytrema silicula (A. Gould, 1847)

= Juga plicifera =

Species of gastropod

Juga plicifera, common name pleated juga, and graceful keeled horn snail is a species of small freshwater snail with an ovate and corneous operculum, ranging in size from 16mm to 35mm long. The snail is dextrally coiled with about 15 whorls and 10 to 12 axial plicae on each whorl. It is an aquatic gastropod mollusk in the family Semisulcospiridae.

== Distribution ==
Juga plicifera is distributed throughout northwestern Oregon and Washington, USA, and is found in lakes, rivers, creeks, and tributaries.

== Habitat ==
Juga plicifera can be found clinging to rocks or substrate in slow flowing streams, as well as in the muddy-sand bottoms of small and medium lakes with a preference for shaded sites. It has been shown to like cool, clear water, though it has been noted to have a greater tolerance to siltation and slack water than some other members of the Juga genus (Juga newberryi).

== Ecology ==
Juga plicifera serves as an intermediate host for Nanophyetus salmincola.

== Conservation ==
Juga plicifera is assessed as a vulnerable species in Oregon by NatureServe. Population in Washington do not have an assessed conservation status.

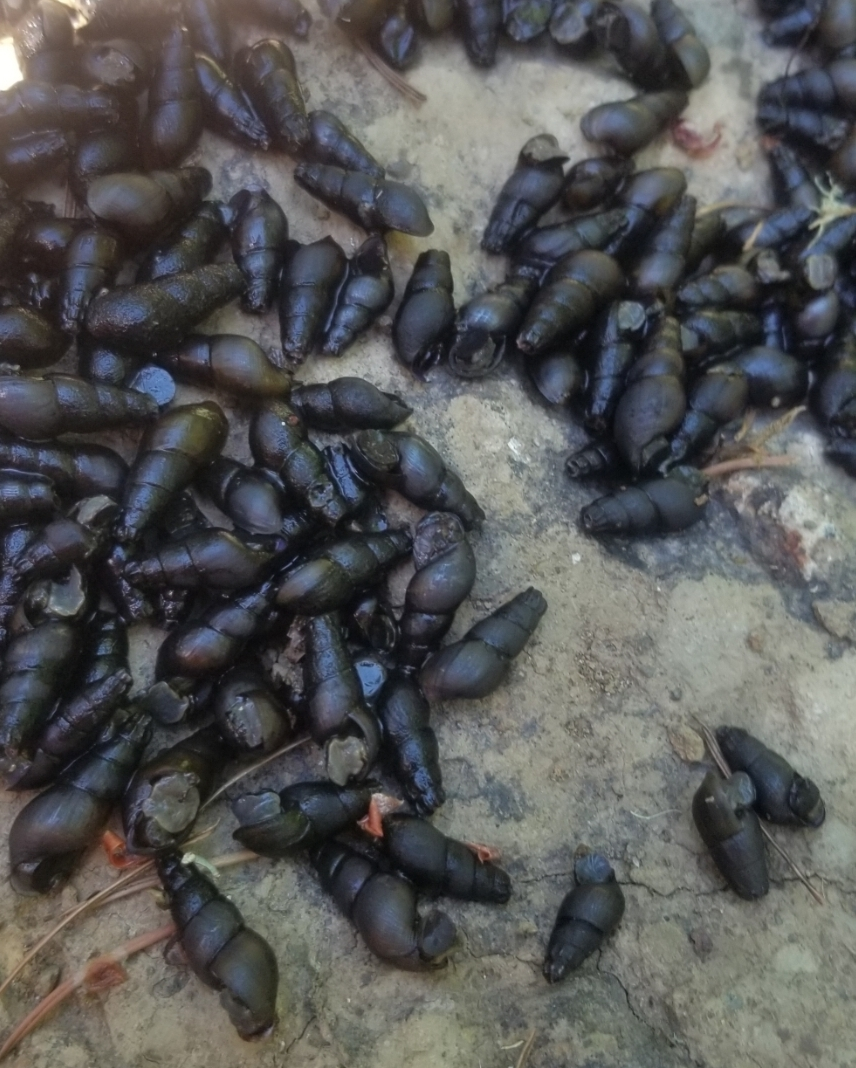
J. plicifera observed in a stream in the Willamette Valley of Oregon
