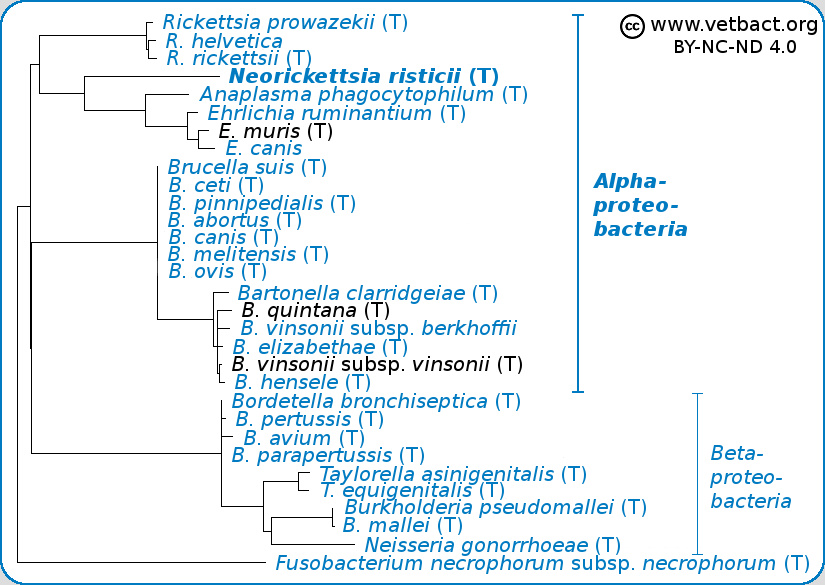
- Neorickettsia risticii phylogenetic tree based on 16S rRNA gene sequences

Scientific classification
- Domain: Bacteria
- Kingdom: Pseudomonadati
- Phylum: Pseudomonadota
- Class: Alphaproteobacteria
- Subclass: "Rickettsidae"
- Order: Rickettsiales
- Family: Anaplasmataceae
- Genus: Neorickettsia
- Species: N. risticii

Binomial name
- Neorickettsia risticii (Dumler et al., 2001)

Synonyms
- Ehrlichia risticii

= Neorickettsia risticii =

Species of bacterium

Neorickettsia risticii, formerly Ehrlichia risticii, is an obligate intracellular gram-negative bacterium that typically lives as an endosymbiont in parasitic flatworms, specifically flukes. N. risticii is the known causative agent of equine neorickettsiosis (also known as Potomac horse fever or PHF), which gets its name from its discovery near the Potomac River in Maryland and Virginia. N. risticii was first recovered from horses in this region in 1984 but was recognized as the causative agent of PHF in 1979. Potomac horse fever is currently endemic in the United States but has also been reported with lower frequency in other regions, including Canada, Brazil, Uruguay, and Europe. PHF is a condition that is clinically important for horses since it can cause serious signs such as fever, diarrhea, colic, and laminitis. PHF has a fatality rate of approximately 30%, making this condition a concern for horse owners in endemic regions. N. risticii is typically acquired in the middle to late summer near freshwater streams or rivers, as well as on irrigated pastures. This is a seasonal infection because it relies on the ingestion of an arthropod vector, which is more commonly found on pasture in the summer months. Although N. risticii is a well known causative agent for PHF in horses, it may act as a potential pathogen in cats and dogs as well. Not only has N. risticii been successfully cultured from monocytes of dogs and cats, but cats have become clinically ill after experimental infection with the bacteria. In addition, N. risticii has been isolated and cultured from human histiocytic lymphoma cells.

== Taxonomy, morphology, and identification ==
Neorickettsia risticii is a member of the order Rickettsiales and family Anaplasmataceae within the class Alphaproteobacteria. N. risticii are obligate intracellular organisms of equine monocytes/macrophages and glandular intestinal epithelium. Individual organisms are small, pleomorphic (coccoid to ellipsoidal) gram negative aerobes that lack LPS and peptidoglycan in their cell walls. They have two cell forms: a reticular body type form that is large and light, and a smaller elementary body type form that is electron-dense. They can exist as individual cells or as morulae (colonies similar in appearance to mulberries) and replicate in parasitophorous vacuoles via binary fission within the host cell. Identification can be done based on cell culture isolation, serology, or PCR assay. However, N. risticii is rarely identified in monocytes from peripheral blood smears. PCR assays can be performed on blood and feces (antemortem identification) or on fresh or formalin fixed tissues (postmortem identification). N. risticii can be viewed using light microscopy with a variety of stains: Giemsa and Romanowsky stains will mark the bacteria dark blue to purple, Machiavello will stain red, and hematoxylin eosin (H&E) will stain pale blue.

== Transmission ==
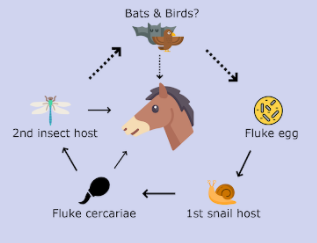
Proposed life cycle and mode of transmission of Neorickettsia risticii

The exact mode of transmission of N. risticii has been undetermined for many years due to its complex life cycle. N. risticii is transmitted vertically inside a trematode (fluke), Acanthatrium oregonense, and the transmission of N. risticii is closely related to the life cycle of the fluke. As the fluke develops and gets into the next host, N. risticii is passed on to the next host along with it. The proposed mode of transmission involves two intermediate hosts (an aquatic snail and an aquatic insect such as caddisflies and mayflies). The egg of the fluke is ingested by an aquatic snail. Then, the cercaria form of the fluke develops and emerges from the snail into the environment. The cercaria then invades the second intermediate host, the larval or nymph stage of an aquatic insect. The cercaria develops into a metacercaria as the insect develops into an adult. The adult insect is then ingested by an insectivore such as a bat or a swallow. It is thought that bats and swallows serve as the definitive hosts for the fluke and natural reservoirs of N. risticii.

It is proposed that horses can be exposed to N. risticii through two routes. Horses can be exposed through skin penetration by infected cercaria form of the fluke. This is commonly seen when horses are grazing near contaminated water sources. Another route of exposure is through directly ingesting the second intermediate host, aquatic insects, containing the infected metacercariae.

== Pathogenesis ==
It is proposed that N. risticii is an obligate intracellular bacterium which prefer replicating in monocytes of the host. Once phagocytized by the monocyte, the pathogen prevents lysosomal fusion with the phagosome thus escaping the host defense mechanism. Once N. risticii establishes infection inside the host, the primary targets are the epithelial cells, mast cells, and macrophages located in the host's large intestine. The infected intestinal epithelial cells suffer from impaired electrolyte transport and loss of microvilli, which contribute to decreased electrolyte absorption and increased water loss in the large intestine. Therefore, diarrhea is one of the common clinical signs of equine neorickettsiosis.

== Clinical significance ==
Neorickettsia risticii is the infectious cause of equine neorickettsiosis, or the colloquially termed Potomac horse fever (PHF). This disease is acquired when horses ingest a trematode host that is infected with the bacteria. Because of the presence of the arthropod vector, it seems that this disease is of concern in the summer, when warmer weather permits these vectors to be present on pasture. N. risticii is able to stay inside these trematodes through their development stages, and can also be transmitted to future generations through a transovarial transmission route. Once infected, the horse is not contagious to other horses, as the infection must be spread by the intermediate host ingestion.

This disease can cause horses to become feverish, experience liquid diarrhea, show a quiet demeanor and go off their food, which can lead to colic and laminitis. Intestinal lesions previously seen with PHF include pronounced enterocolitis with ulcerative erosions and evident reduction in villus projections. The lesions will result in the horse having severe gastrointestinal disease, and reduced ability to absorb nutrients. Lesions that were linked to the presence of the bacteria in the blood include hepatitis, kidney tubule inflammation, loss of renal arterial blood supply, and inflammation of the adrenal glands. There are also changes to the blood in response to infection, and early PHF can result in reduced white blood cells, including low neutrophils and low lymphocytes, while progression of PHF can result in an inflammatory response and increased white blood cells. Replication of N. risticii happens within the epithelial lining of the intestines, and within myeloid cells such as macrophages, monocytes, and mast cells. The condition can be fatal in 3 out of 10 horses that are infected, but up to one-third of horses infected have been shown to be asymptomatic, so there is variability in the disease presentation. Due to the severe symptoms associated with the disease, and fatality rate, this condition is of concern for horse owners.

If a pregnant mare is infected with N. risticii and has symptoms of PHF, there is a chance that it may cause abortion and lesions in the fetus. Studies have been done on mares that were infected either naturally or artificially with N. risticii and experienced abortion. The fetuses had lesions of liver inflammation, heart inflammation, enterocolitis, and inflammation of the mesenteric lymph nodes. Abortion seems to be a notable complication of PHF, as was showcased in a study that infected pregnant mares with N. risticii resulting in abortion in just over half of the subjects. This infection does not cause inflammation of the placenta, and lesions are generally absent from the placenta or very minor, yet it does cause lesions in the fetus itself, which is quite unique. PHF is not a well documented cause for equine abortion, and is often not chosen as a differential diagnosis. However, it could be argued that N. risticii requires more research in this area, and could be a more common cause of equine abortion than was previously thought.

== Diagnostics ==
Diagnosis of Potomac horse fever (PHF) is most commonly based on serological techniques and therefore requires collecting a blood sample from an infected horse. Neorickettsia risticii is detected in the blood using an indirect immunofluorescent antibody (IFA) test or by PCR identification. The IFA serological test detects the presence of IgG and IgM antibodies against N. risticii in the blood, however does not differentiate whether an animal is actively infected or has had previous exposure. The use of IFA at a single point in time does not provide an accurate diagnosis and therefore requires IFA testing at multiple time points to detect increasing antibody titres. Increasing antibody titres in conjunction with clinical signs is suggestive of an active PHF infection. PCR assays can be performed on both the blood and stool of an infected animal and allows the detection of N. risticii in these samples. PCR is the test of choice in vaccinated animals because these animals will have antibodies against N. risticii, which interferes with the IFA test.

Cell culture isolation can also be used for the detection and isolation of Neorickettsia risticii, although it is a more time-consuming technique that requires specialized equipment and is not routinely used as a diagnostic method. N. risticii is an obligate intracellular microorganism and as such is more technically difficult to culture, isolate, and ship to a diagnostic laboratory. Cell culture isolation detects the presence of live bacteria and can be used to isolate bacteria from an infected animal, the environment, or a parasitic host. Strain variation among isolates can be determined by identifying surface antigens or by performing whole-genome sequencing. Molecular analysis surface antigens has found significant genetic and phenotypic variation in strains of N. risticii, these variations may contribute to vaccination failures.

== Treatment and prevention ==
The main clinical presentation of Neorickettsia risticii is Potomac horse fever (PHF). Timely diagnosis and treatment of PHF is important for preventing the disease from progressing and causing clinical signs such as laminitis, endotoxemia and colic. Successfully preventing this progression can greatly increase an infected horse's chance of survival. Treatment of PHF utilizes a combination of antimicrobial and supportive therapy. Oxytetracycline has been found to be the most successful antimicrobial treatment for PHF and has been correlated to increased survival time. When treatment is delayed until after the onset of clinical signs, additional therapy with doxycycline, demeclocycline or rifampin has been associated with higher antibody titer levels than those of untreated animals. In addition to antimicrobial treatment, supportive therapy for pain management, dehydration and gastrointestinal function should also be utilized to treat laminitis, endotoxemia and colic, respectively. Laminitis can be treated with a combination of cryotherapy and an opioid, such as butorphanol or morphine. Intravenous lactated Ringer's solution can be given for fluid and electrolyte replenishment and Flunixin Meglumine can be used to treat signs of colic, both of which can help offset signs of endotoxemia and prevent endotoxic shock.

There are currently two types of vaccines for Potomac horse fever available. One is an inactive monovalent vaccine that protects against PHF only, and the other is an inactive multivalent vaccine that is combined with a rabies vaccination. There is some evidence to show that the multivalent PHF/rabies vaccine provides lower immunogenicity in contrast to the monovalent PHF vaccine when it is given with a separate rabies vaccine. The efficacy of these vaccines has been reported to be quite poor due to the fact that they contain only one of several strains of N. risticii, but studies have also shown that vaccinated horses that do become infected tend to show less severe clinical signs when compared to unvaccinated horses. The vaccines are recommended to be given annually, but horses in endemic regions can be given a second dose three to four weeks following the initial vaccine to help increase the effectiveness. Pregnant mares should also be given an additional vaccine four to six weeks prior to foaling.

== See also ==
- Neorickettsia sennetsu
