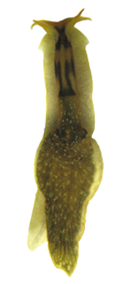
- Acochlidium fijiiensis

Scientific classification
- Domain: Eukaryota
- Kingdom: Animalia
- Phylum: Mollusca
- Class: Gastropoda
- Family: Acochlidiidae
- Genus: Acochlidium
- Species: A. fijiiensis

Binomial name
- Acochlidium fijiiensis Haynes & Kenchington, 1991

Synonyms
- Acochlidium fijiiense Acochlidium fijiense

= Acochlidium fijiiensis =

Species of gastropod

Acochlidium fijiiensis is a species of freshwater slug, an aquatic gastropod mollusc within the family Acochlidiidae.

This species lives in two rivers on Fiji.
