= Palliohedyle sutteri =

Conservation status
- Critically Endangered (IUCN 3.1)

Scientific classification
- Kingdom: Animalia
- Phylum: Mollusca
- Class: Gastropoda
- Family: Acochlidiidae
- Genus: Palliohedyle
- Species: P. sutteri

Binomial name
- Palliohedyle sutteri (Wawra, 1979)

Species of gastropod

Palliohedyle sutteri is a species of gastropods belonging to the family Acochlidiidae.

The species inhabits freshwater environments.
