= Potomac horse fever =

Bacterial disease of horses

Potomac Horse Fever (PHF) is a potentially-fatal febrile illness affecting horses caused by the intracellular bacterium Neorickettsia risticii. PHF is also known as Shasta River Crud and Equine Monocytic Ehrlichiosis. It was first described in areas surrounding the Potomac River northwest of Washington, D.C., in the 1980s, but cases have been described in many other parts of the United States, such as Minnesota, California, and Pennsylvania. Currently, it is found in more than 40 U.S. states and Canada.

== Cause ==
The causative agent of PHF is Neorickettsia risticii (formerly Ehrlichia risticii), an intracellular rickettsial bacterium.

== Transmission ==
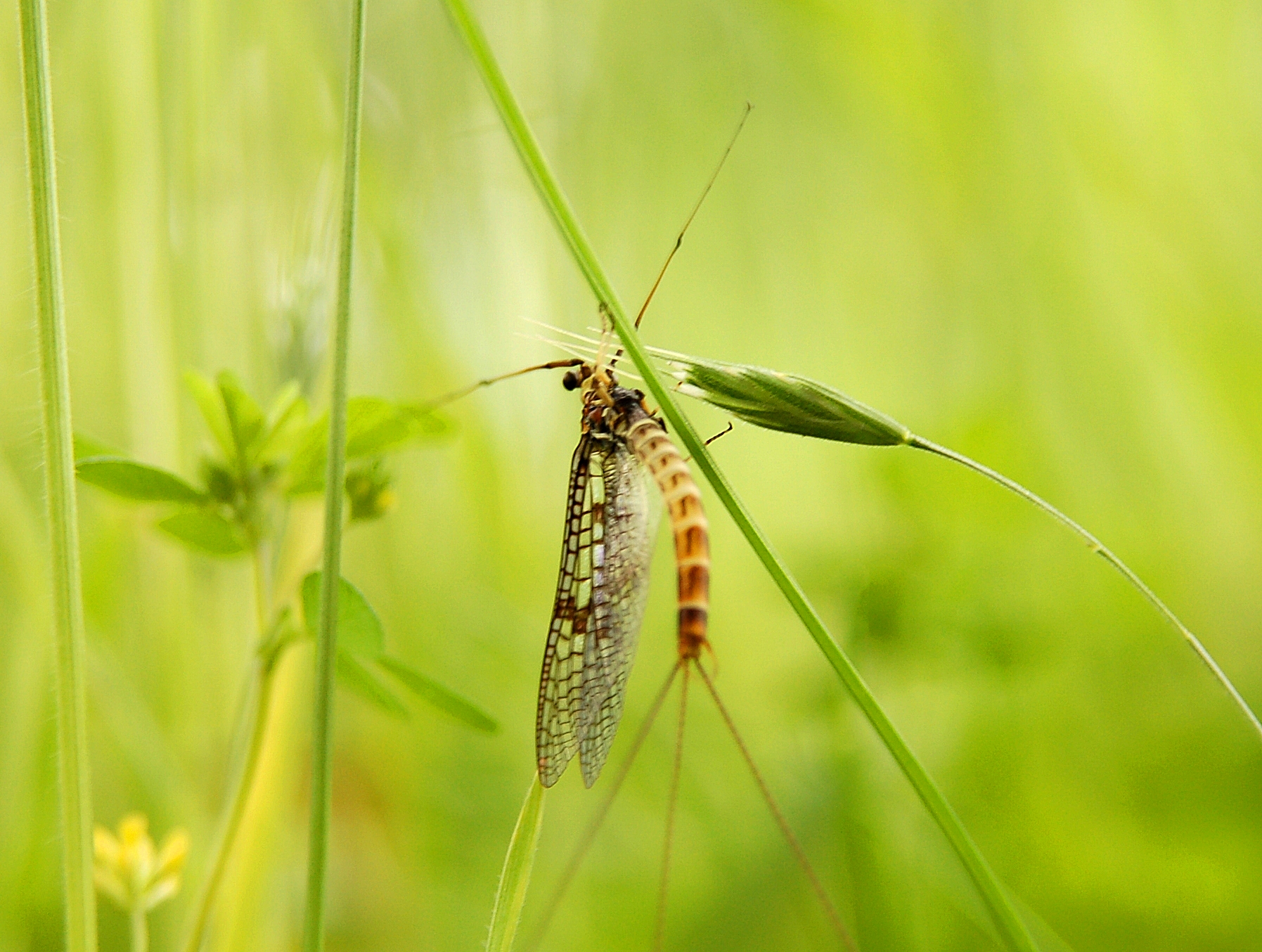
Accidental ingestion of the mayfly is thought to be one of the main modes of transmission of PHF.

The vector of Neorickettsia risticii is believed to be a trematode (fluke). The life cycle of the fluke takes it through freshwater snails and back into water, where it is ingested by the larval stages of several aquatic insects, including caddis flies and mayflies. It is thought that the main mode of infection is by accidental ingestion of infected adult insects, who may fly into barns and die in stalls or on pastures after enclosure. Experimental infection has been produced with oral administration of infected insects and subcutaneous inoculation of N. risticii. All attempts to transmit the disease using ticks have failed.

Several outbreaks of PHF have been found to coincide with mass emergences of burrowing mayflies of the genus Hexagenia; these insects hatch en masse and may be found littering the ground in nearby stables, where they are attracted by light. The entire natural history and life cycle of N. risticii has yet to be elucidated, but bats and birds may be wild reservoirs of infection. Unlike other causes of acute colitis in horses, such as Salmonella and Clostridium, PHF is not spread directly from horse to horse.

== Signs and symptoms ==
Signs and symptoms of PHF include acute-onset fever, depression (sometimes profound), inappetence, mild colic-like symptoms, decreased manure production, profuse watery non-fetid diarrhea endotoxemia, edema due to protein imbalances, abortion by pregnant mares, and acute laminitis (20 to 40 percent of cases). Infected horses founder usually within three days of the initial symptoms, thought to be secondary to endotoxemia. Death may occur and is usually due to severe laminitis leading to founder.

Horses may not always display any other symptoms beyond a fever.

== Diagnosis ==
Diagnosis of PHF is accomplished by measuring antibody titers or PCR testing to look for the bacterium in the blood and feces. However, most veterinarians opt to initiate treatment right away, as the disease can progress quite quickly. Veterinarians may also run complete blood counts and chemistry and electrolyte panels to determine the course of care. Radiographs may be taken to track the progress of laminitic horses.

== Treatment ==
N. risticii responds well to tetracycline antibiotics. Mild cases may be treated with oral doxycycline, while severe cases are usually treated with intravenous oxytetracycline.

Supportive care for severe cases is aimed at minimizing the effects of endotoxemia and preventing laminitis. This may include intravenous fluids and electrolytes to counteract the diarrhea; NSAIDs such as Banamine (flunixin meglumine); intravenous dimethyl sulfoxide; administration of products such as Biosponge or activated charcoal via nasogastric tube to bind endotoxins; polymyxin B or plasma for endotoxemia; supportive shoeing; low doses of intramuscular acepromazine; and pentoxifylline.

== Prevention ==
While a vaccine is available for PHF, it does not cover all strains of the bacterium, and recent vaccine failures seem to be on the rise. Additionally, the vaccine usually produces a very weak immune response, which may only lessen the severity of the disease rather than prevent it. The vaccine is administered twice a year, in early spring and in early summer, with the first one inoculation given before the mayflies emerge and the second administered as a booster.

Some veterinarians have started making recommendations for farm management to try to prevent this disease:

- Maintaining riparian barriers along bodies of water may encourage aquatic insects to stay near their places of origin
- Turning off outside lights around the barn will prevent insects from being attracted
- Cleaning water buckets and feed areas frequently and keeping food covered will reduce the chance that the horse will accidentally ingest infected insects
