= Nanophyetus =

Scientific classification
- Kingdom: Animalia
- Phylum: Platyhelminthes
- Class: Trematoda
- Order: Plagiorchiida
- Family: Troglotrematidae
- Genus: Nanophyetus; Chapin, 1927
- Species: N. salmincola

Binomial name
- Nanophyetus salmincola (Chapin, 1926) Chapin, 1927

Synonyms
- Troglotrema salmincola; Nanophyetus schikhobalowi (Russian form)

Genus of flukes

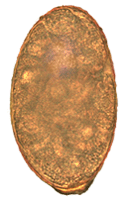
An egg of Nanophyetus salmincola

Nanophyetus salmincola is a food-borne intestinal trematode parasite prevalent on the Pacific Northwest coast. The species may be the most common trematode endemic to the United States.

The life cycle of the N. salmincola requires three hosts. The first intermediate host is an Juga plicifera stream snail. The second intermediate host is a salmonid fish, though some non-salmonid fishes also play a role. Lastly, the definitive host is most commonly a canid, though many other mammals are also definitive hosts, including humans. Transmission of N. salmincola to the definitive host occurs upon ingestion of parasite-infected fish.

The parasite is most known for its association with "salmon poisoning disease", which, left untreated, is fatal to dogs and other canids. However, canids are affected by the Neorickettsia helminthoeca bacteria, for which N. salmincola acts as a vector, and not by the parasite itself.

Very few known cases of naturally acquired human infection with N. salmincola are found in the literature, though it is likely that many cases are unreported, since most people are asymptomatic, or symptomatic with non-specific symptoms like gastrointestinal discomfort. Disease caused by N. salmincola, or nanophyetiasis, is easily preventable by thoroughly cooking fish before consumption. There are no known cases of human infection by the Rickettsia bacteria carried by N. salmincola.

A subspecific parasite, Nanophyetus schikhobalowi, is endemic to Siberia, where human cases of nanophyetiasis have been reported in scientific literature since 1931.

== Discovery ==
The first record of salmon poisoning disease (SPD) was reported in northwestern Oregon in 1814 when a writer for Henry's Astoria Journal noted the death of dogs after consumption of raw salmon. At first, investigators believed that SPD was caused by poisonous blood in the ingested fish. In 1911, small white cysts were observed in the kidneys of disease-causing salmon and trout, but the cysts were mistakenly identified as amebae. Small trematodes in the intestines of dogs that died after eating infected salmon were finally found in 1925 and the cysts present in the salmon were correctly identified as intermediate stages of the trematode. In an experimental follow-up study, researchers showed that the small intestinal parasite did in fact cause SPD in dogs, and that the cysts did develop into the adult worm found in the intestine.

The trematode was first named by Chapin as Nanophyes salmincola in 1926, as a member of the family Heterophyidae. Upon further examination of the morphology, Chapin reassigned the trematode to the family Troglotrematidae and renamed the parasite Nanophyetus salmincola, since Nanophyes was already taken. Discussions regarding the correctness of classification of the parasite continued as the trematode received further scientific attention and its morphology and behavior was further scrutinized. Ultimately, Nanophyetus salmincola was agreed upon, though Troglotrema salmincola remains a synonym.

In 1931, Skrjabin and Podjapolskaja describe a similar parasite, Nanophyetus schikhobalowi, which was endemic to East Siberia. Argument regarding whether or not N. schikhobalowi and N. salmincola were the same or different species recurred until 1966 when the two were granted subspecific status in order to reflect their biological and geographic differences, but little significant morphological differences. Since its discovery, N. schikhobalowi has been known to naturally infect humans and research reveals surveys indicating rates of infection in endemic Siberian villages of up to 98%.

In contrast, N. salmincola was not recognized to be a source of an infection until a researcher purposefully infected himself in a scientific experiment in 1958. Besides Philip experimentally infecting himself with the North American N. salmincola, the first naturally acquired human intestinal infection cases were observed between September 1974 and October 1985. The study revealed 10 patients who presented with positive N. salmincola stool samples and either gastrointestinal complaints or otherwise unexplainable peripheral blood eosinophilia. 7 patients recalled ingestion of undercooked or raw fish. Of those who were not given effective treatment, symptoms and/or eggs in stools persisted for 2 or more months before spontaneously resolving. It was hypothesized that the movement, attachment, and irritation of the adult worms in the small intestine mucosa was the likely cause of gastrointestinal symptoms and peripheral eosinophilia.

Two years after the first 10 cases of human infection with N. salmincola were reported in 1987, Fritsche et al. reported ten additional cases of human nanophyetiasis. Five presented with gastrointestinal complaints and the other five had unexplained peripheral eosinophilia. Nine out of ten recalled eating inadequately cooked fish. This time, praziquantel was the effective treatment of choice.

In 1990, the first case of human infection with N. salmincola without ingestion of raw or undercooked contaminated fish was reported. A man was infected through hand contamination while handling highly infected, fresh-killed, coho salmon. A diagnosis of nanophyetiasis was made based on gastrointestinal discomfort, peripheral blood eosinophilia and a positive stool sample. Treatment with praziquantel was effective.

None of the human cases of infection with either the North American or Siberian subspecies reveal infection by the Neorickettsia helminthoeca carried within the trematode, which was discovered in 1950. Infection by rickettsia helps to explain the more fatal outcome afflicting canids.

== Clinical presentation in humans ==
Upon infection with N. salmincola, humans are normally asymptomatic. If symptoms are present, they are usually non-specific and mistaken for indication of other gastrointestinal problems. Symptoms include "diarrhea, unexplained peripheral blood eosinophilia, abdominal discomfort, nausea and vomiting, weight loss, and fatigue". Eggs of N. salmincola appear in stools approximately one week after ingestion of infected fish.

== Pathology in dogs ==
Nanophyetiasis in dogs is much more serious than in humans. Scientists noticed almost 200 years ago that dogs that consumed raw fish sometimes died rather quickly. This "salmon poisoning", while associated with the trematode Nanophyetus salmincola, is not caused by the worm. The sickness is caused by Neorickettsia helminthoeca, a rickettsial bacteria that uses the N. salmincola as a host. Although only canines are susceptible to the disease raccoons show a raised temperature and lymphatic infection after being infected by the rickettsia, but both soon subside. The incubation period in dogs is 5–7 days, although it may take as long as 33 days. After onset, there is a sharp fever coupled with anorexia, vomiting and dysentery. The rickettsia attacks the canine's lymph system causing enlarging and eventually hemorrhaging many of the lymphnodes. The disease can spread to other tissues such as leukocytes. Death occurs 10–14 days after signs first appear.

== Transmission ==
Nanophyetus salmincola is transmitted most commonly by the ingestion of raw, undercooked, or smoked salmon or steelhead trout. Usually this is meant to be ingestion of the muscle of the fish but there have been cases reported in which the suspected agent of transmission was steelhead roe. Researchers hypothesize, in fish with especially high worm burdens, that the N. salmincola may migrate to many of the fishes’ tissues, not just the muscle tissue. In a case in 1990, nanophyetiasis was diagnosed in an individual who is thought to have acquired the disease by simple handling of fresh-killed salmon. The infected individual, ironically, was a researcher studying N. salmincola in juvenile Coho salmon who had inadvertently initiated the infection by hand-to-mouth contact during the 3-month-long study.

== Reservoir ==
The reservoirs for N. salmincola are raccoons, mink, and skunks. Reservoirs are organisms that harbor parasites within themselves without suffering any signs of pathology, and spreading the parasites through their natural behavior. For example, raccoons naturally spread N. salmincola because they frequently eat fish and defecate parasitic eggs in or near the water, where subsequent larval stages can continue their life cycle.

== Vector ==
Vectors are organisms that transmit parasites from one host to another. Juga plicifera stream snails are biological vectors for a larval stage of N. salmincola. Salmonid and some non-salmonid fish are vectors of the metacercariae of N. salmincola. Both fresh and ocean water fish can be parasitic vectors. Fish that act as second intermediate hosts are different species of the families Salmonidae, Cottidae, and Cyprinidae. Among the thirty-four natural and experimental secondary hosts found in scientific literature are the coastal cutthroat trout, rainbow trout, coho salmon, chum salmon, and kokanee salmon. More infection occurs in salmonid fish, rather than non-salmonid fish. In particular, salmonid fish of the genera Salmo, Oncorhynchus, and Salvelinus play a significant role in the N. salmincola life cycle. The parasite itself is also a vector for Neorickettsia helminthoeca.

== Definitive hosts ==
Definitive hosts include fish-eating birds and mammals. The most common definitive hosts are the domestic dog, cat, and red fox. Humans are also definitive hosts for N. salmincola. A long list of experimental definitive hosts include the hamster and wood rat. An experimental study failed to infect two white rats and two white mice. Trematodes exist along the whole length of the small intestine in smaller animals like hamsters, while they exist only in the upper end of the small intestine in larger animals like dogs.

== Incubation period ==
After ingestion of fish infected with N. salmincola, it takes about 1 week for symptoms to occur, namely for eggs to be detected in the stool.

== Morphology ==
Eggs of N. salmincola are light brown, ovoid, and operculate at one end, with a small blunt projection at the other end. They measure 0.087 mm to 0.097 mm by 0.038 mm to 0.055 mm. There are normally 5 to 16 eggs in the uterus, and their heaviness allows them to sink rapidly in water.

N. salmincola is a digenic trematode, which means that it is an unsegmented worm that is flattened dorsoventrally. Adult worms alternate shape from "a sphere to a long blunt rod". The worms are 0.8 to 1.1mm long and 0.3 to 0.5 mm wide and are hermaphroditic, having both male and female reproductive organs in the same organism. The two large oval testes are 0.2 to 0.3 mm long and the round ovary is 0.07 to 0.11 mm in diameter. N. salmincola has a prominent cirrus pouch, or hollow organ surrounding the male copulatory organ, but no seminal vesicle. True to its character as a trematode, it has an oral sucker 0.15 to 0.18 mm in diameter, and a ventral sucker 0.12 to 0.13 mm in diameter. The oral and ventral suckers are used to grasp and crawl actively about the intestinal tissue of its host, though the worm leaves no extensive mechanical damage.

== Life cycle ==
The adult lays eggs within the vertebrate host. The vertebrate passes out the eggs in its feces. The first larval stage, the miracidia, develop within the eggs, hatch, and swim away. The miracidia then penetrate the first intermediate host, the Juga plicifera stream snail. After further development in the stream snail, N. salmincola larva develop into rediae, which give rise to cercariae. The cercariae emerge from the snail and penetrate the second intermediate host, the salmonid (some non-salmonid) fish. The parasites develop into metacercaria and encyst within the kidneys, muscles, and fins of the salmonid fish. The parasites enter its final host, including canids and humans, upon ingestion of the infected fish, and develop into adult worms that produce eggs to be passed in the host's feces.

== Detailed information regarding the life cycle stages ==
Eggs and miracidia: The eggs passed in the feces are unembryonated. Experimental studies demonstrate that eggs collected in room water temperature require 75 days to 200 days to hatch., The hatching rate of miracidia from eggs increases with decreasing temperatures, and egg mortality increases with increasing temperatures. Fully developed miracidia within the eggs contract and elongate repeatedly, and newly emerged miracidia swim in "characteristic, long graceful curves". The miracidia seem to have no attraction to host snails, bumping into the snails without attempting to penetrate and infect them.

Rediae: The rediae are the second larval stage of the trematode life cycle, that develops from the miracidum and contains germ cells that develop into cercariae. The rediae are found in the second intermediate host, the snail. Rediae can range from 0.45 mm to 3 mm, and the larger rediae can contain up to 76 cercariae. Rediae and cercariae are found in all tissues of the host snail, but primarily in the gonads and the digestive gland., Rediae destroy the gonads, invade the hepatopancreas, damage it by 1) increased pressure from rapid growth, 2) active ingestion by the parasites, and 3) the disposition of parasitic wastes. Furthermore, parasites take up glycogen and lipids from the hepatopancreas.

Cercariae: The cercariae measure 0.31 mm to 0.47 mm by 0.03 mm to 0.15 mm and live up to 48 hours in water. They have a tendency to infect snails that are at least 2.5 cm in length, though smaller snails have also been observed to shed cercariae. Cercariae shed intermittently by the thousands, entering the mantle cavity of the snail, and drifting out with the "exhalent water current on the right side of the snail’s head"., Cercariae from snails in brackish water of a low salinity were found to survive longer than snails in freshwater.

Once cercariae are shed from the snail, it contracts repeatedly until it contacts a fish and penetrates under its skin within 30 seconds to 2 minutes. The cercariae penetrate further into the renal portal blood system, into the kidney and deeper tissues into the base of the tail. Penetrations sights are easily visible, as the skin, fins, and tails of the fish appear to be heavily eroded and damaged. Cercariae can also indirectly infect the fish, if the fish eat the cercariae orally.

Metacercariae: The cercariae lose their tails in the act of penetration and encyst as metacercariae in almost any tissue of the salmonid fish. The new cyst wall is thin, transparent, and easily ruptured. If the cyst wall breaks, the metacercariae crawl out and re-encyst a few hours later in a tougher, larger cyst wall. While cysts can be found in all tissues of the fish, most encystment occurs in the kidneys and body muscles of the salmonid fish, and in the gills and fins of the non-salmonid fish. Cercariae penetrate less deeply in non-salmonid fish than in salmonid fish. Infected fish experience a decrease in their swimming activity and loss of equilibrium, and it is not uncommon for fish to have as many as 1000 to 2000 metacercariae in its tissues.,

Importantly, metacercariae can be destroyed either by cooking or freezing infected fish.

Snail: The Juga plicifera host snail is prevalent in coast streams and prefers large rocks, bridges, old planks, and debris on stream bed bottoms. It rarely migrates into shallow water. The infection of snails is high in comparison to the number of cercariae it sheds, since larval development continues slowly over a long period of time. Evidence of mixed infection varied between studies, but snails with large numbers of N. salmincola were not parasitized by other trematodes. It was also found that monthly incidence of infection in snails ranged from 9–52% after examining over 3000 snails every month for 10 months, and that mature cercariae infected snails in a seasonal manner. Mature cercariae were more likely to infect snails in late April to November.

Neorickettsia helmintheoca Neorickettsia helmintheoca is the etiological agent for salmon poisoning disease, found to be present in all stages of the trematode. It is 0.3 micrometers in size and a purple Giemsa stain indicates that it is Gram negative. Thus far, only canids are susceptible to disease by rickettsia and it is still uncertain how the rickettsia leave the trematode vector and reaches the host tissues. Experiments do show that the bacteria lead to necrosis of lymph follicles, ulceration, and severe hemorrhage in its host.

== Diagnostic tests ==
1. History of eating raw fish
2. Examination of feces for eggs of N. salmincola

Because only a few eggs are contained within each adult worm, patients with light infections are likely to have negative stool tests. Using trichrome stained preparations rather than formalin-ethyl acetate concentrates was more sensitive to identify cases.

== Management and therapy ==
Praziquantel, 20 mg/kg body weight, three times a day. Praziquantel causes immobilized contraction of the worm, such that it can no longer grasp the intestinal walls, and can be eliminated from the body. Three 2-g doses of niclosamide or two 50 mg/kg doses of bithionol have also been effective when praziquantel was either not available or treatment was refused. However, a single 2-g dose of niclosamine was ineffective, as was 100 mg orally of mebendazole twice a day for three days. If diarrhea recurs, general supplements may also be needed in order to maintain electrolyte balance and meet nutritional requirements.

== Epidemiology ==
Nanophyetus salmincola is limited to the geographic range of its intermediate hosts, primarily the US Pacific Northwest. Stream snails are found west of the Cascade Mountains in Oregon, north to the Olympic Peninsula in Washington, and in part of northern California. It is "the most common systemic trematode in the United States".

== Public health and prevention strategies ==
- Cook fish thoroughly
- Freeze fish for at least 24 hours
- Fish away from known snail endemic places (otherwise make especially sure to cook fish thoroughly)
- Take precautions when handling fish (prevent hand-to-mouth transmission of the metacercariae and be wary of hand contamination from heavily infected fish)
- Check fish periodically for signs of infection, such as cysts or sites of irritation from penetration of the cercarariae (pertinent to fishing companies, fish markets, and restaurants)
- Report sources of infected fish (bodies of water, fish companies, restaurants)
- Eat raw fish only from trusted sources, such as reputable restaurants
- Use molluscicides if can be practically used in smaller bodies of water
- Keep dogs away from streams, making sure they defecate away from snail habitats
