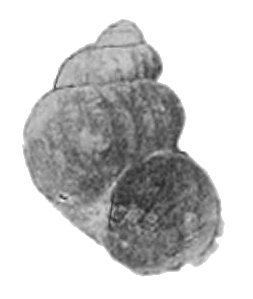
- Apertural view of a shell of Teratobaikalia macrostoma

Scientific classification
- Kingdom: Animalia
- Phylum: Mollusca
- Class: Gastropoda
- Subclass: Caenogastropoda
- Order: Littorinimorpha
- Family: Baicaliidae
- Genus: Teratobaikalia
- Species: T. macrostoma

Binomial name
- Teratobaikalia macrostoma (Lindholm, 1909)

Synonyms
- Baicalia (Teratobaicalia) macrostoma f. lyogyra Lindholm, 1924; Baikalia (Teratobaikalia) macrostoma Lindholm, 1909

= Teratobaikalia macrostoma =

Species of gastropod

Teratobaikalia macrostoma is a species of a freshwater snail with an operculum, an aquatic gastropod mollusk in the family Baicaliidae.

Teratobaikalia macrostoma is the type species of the genus Teratobaikalia.

== Distribution ==
Teratobaikalia macrostoma lives in the northern and central parts of Lake Baikal, in depths from 2 to 100 m. The type locality is Maloe More in Baikal.

== Description ==
The shell has 4.5-5 whorls. The width of the shell is 7.5–9 mm. The height of the shell is 8.75-11.5 mm.

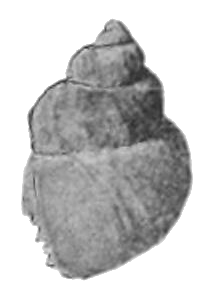
Lateral view of a shell.

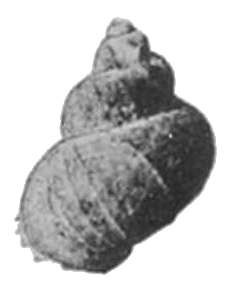
Abapertural view of a shell.

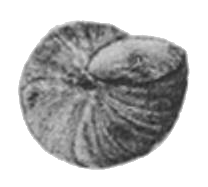
Umbilical view of a shell.
