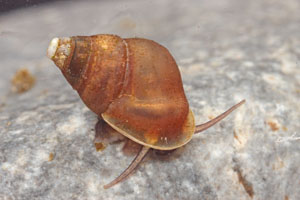
- Emmericia patula

Scientific classification
- Kingdom: Animalia
- Phylum: Mollusca
- Class: Gastropoda
- Subclass: Caenogastropoda
- Order: Littorinimorpha
- Superfamily: Truncatelloidea
- Family: Emmericiidae; Brusina, 1870

= Emmericiidae =

Family of molluscs

Emmericiidae is a family of freshwater gastropods in the superfamily Truncatelloidea, living in lakes and rivers. There are a few species alive in the type genus, Emmericia, but the vast majority of species are extinct. Emmericia was first described by the notable Croatian malacologist Spiridion Brusina in November 1870, although its type species, E. patula, was originally classified as Paludina patula by Leonardo Brumati in 1838. Measuring the number of extant Emmericia species is highly problematic. The family Fontigentidae has previously been considered to be a subfamily, Fontigentinae, of Emmericiidae; however, more recent phylogenetic analysis recovers them as the sister group of the Bythinellidae, with Emmericiidae being more distantly related.

== Genera ==
Genera within the family Emmericiidae include:

† Choerina Brusina, 1882

Emmericia Brusina, 1870 - type genus

† Kuiperia Schlickum, 1961

† Schuettemmericia Schlickum, 1961

† Staadtiellopsis Schlickum, 1968

† Zilchiola Kadolsky, 1993

Synonyms

† Euchilus (Zilcheuchilus) Schlickum, 1965: synonym of † Choerina Brusina, 1882

† Euchilus (Schuettemmericia) Schlickum, 1961: synonym of † Schuettemmericia Schlickum, 1961

† Nystia (Staadtiella) Schlickum, 1968: synonym of † Schuettemmericia Schlickum, 1961

† Nystia (Staadtiellopsis) Schlickum, 1968: synonym of † Staadtiellopsis Schlickum, 1968

Incertae Sedis

† Jucaria Robles: Taxon inquirendum, may never have been published.
