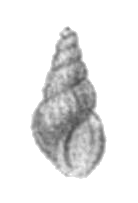
- Apertural view of a shell of Maackia raphidia

Scientific classification
- Kingdom: Animalia
- Phylum: Mollusca
- Class: Gastropoda
- Subclass: Caenogastropoda
- Order: Littorinimorpha
- Family: Amnicolidae
- Genus: Maackia
- Species: M. raphidia

Binomial name
- Maackia raphidia (Bourguignat, 1860)

Synonyms
- Bithynia raphidia Bourguignat, 1860

= Maackia raphidia =

Species of gastropod

Maackia raphidia is a species of freshwater snail with an operculum, an aquatic gastropod mollusk in the family Amnicolidae.

== Distribution ==
Maackia raphidia lives in the Angara River. The type locality is “lac Baikal”, lake Baikal.

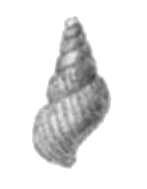
Abapertural view of a shell of Maackia raphidia
