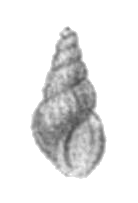
- Apertural view of a shell of Maackia raphidia

Scientific classification
- Kingdom: Animalia
- Phylum: Mollusca
- Class: Gastropoda
- Subclass: Caenogastropoda
- Order: Littorinimorpha
- Family: Amnicolidae
- Genus: Maackia; Clessin, 1880

= Maackia (gastropod) =

Genus of gastropods

Maackia is a genus of freshwater snails with an operculum, an aquatic gastropod mollusk in the family Amnicolidae.

== Species ==
- Maackia angarensis (Gerstfeldt, 1859)
- Maackia bythiniopsis (Lindholm, 1909)
- Maackia costata (W. Dybovski, 1875) - type species
- Maackia herderiana (Lindholm, 1909)
  - Maackia herderiana parvula Kozhov, 1936
  - Maackia herderiana semicostulata (Lindholm, 1924)
- Maackia pusilla (Lindholm, 1909)
- Maackia raphidia (Bourguignat, 1860)
- Maackia umbilicifera (Starostin, 1926)
- Maackia variesculpta (Lindholm, 1909)
- Maackia werestschagini (Kozhov, 1936)
