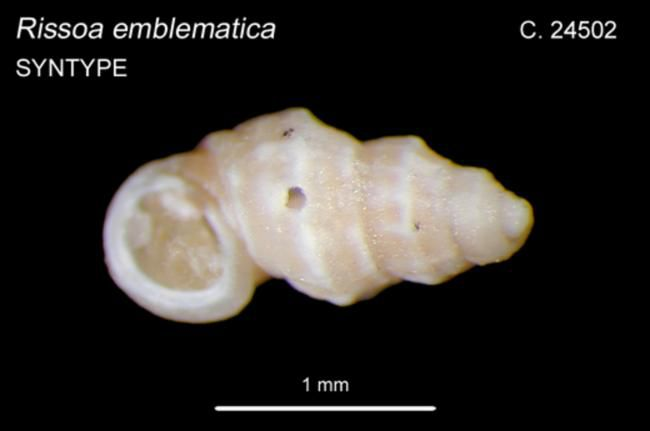

Scientific classification
- Kingdom: Animalia
- Phylum: Mollusca
- Class: Gastropoda
- Subclass: Caenogastropoda
- Order: Littorinimorpha
- Superfamily: Rissooidea
- Family: Emblandidae; Ponder, 1985
- Genus: Emblanda; Ponder, 1985
- Species: E. emblematica

Binomial name
- Emblanda emblematica (Hedley, 1906)

Synonyms
- Rissoa emblematica Hedley, 1906; Anabathron emblematicum (Hedley, 1906)

= Emblanda =

Species of gastropod

Emblanda emblematica is a species of sea snail, a marine aquatic operculate gastropod molluscs in the clade Littorinimorpha.

Emblanda emblematica is the sole species in the genus Emblanda, which itself is the only genus within the family Emblandidae.

== Distribution ==
This species occurs in southeastern Australia.
