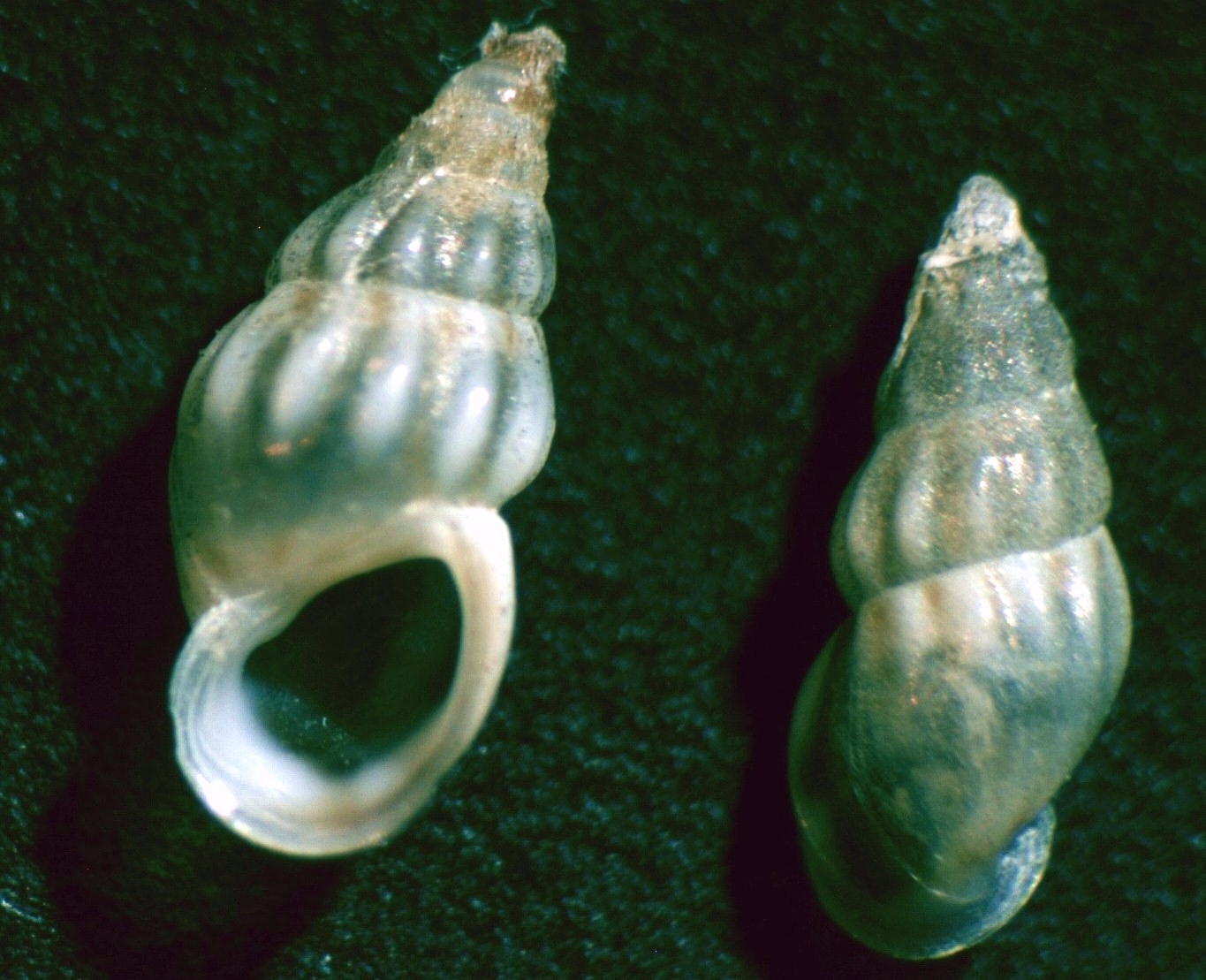
- Two views of a shell of Rissoa membranacea.

Scientific classification
- Kingdom: Animalia
- Phylum: Mollusca
- Class: Gastropoda
- Subclass: Caenogastropoda
- Order: Littorinimorpha
- Superfamily: Rissooidea; Gray, 1847

Families
- See text

Synonyms
- Rissoacea (suffix -oidea mandatory for a superfamily name following current ICZN art. 29.2.); Rissoidea (misspelling)

= Rissooidea =

Superfamily of gastropods

Rissooidea (originally named Rissoacea by Gray in 1847) is a superfamily of tiny marine snails.

Following their phylogenetic analysis of snails in the rissooidean and cingulopsoidean families in 2013, Criscione F. and Ponder W.F. determined that Rissooidea was not monophyletic, and created the superfamily Truncatelloidea, which encompasses many families previously included in the superfamily Rissooidea. Several freshwater, brackish, and semi-terrestrial families and genera within Rissooidea were brought under Truncatelloidea.

== Families ==
Families within the superfamily Rissooidea include:

- Barleeiidae Gray, 1857
- Emblandidae Ponder, 1985
- Lironobidae Ponder, 1967
- † Mesocochliopidae Yu, 1987
- † Palaeorissoinidae Gründel & Kowalke, 2002
- Rissoidae Gray, 1847
- Rissoinidae Stimpson, 1865
- Zebinidae Coan, 1964

Genera unassigned to a family

- † Avardaria Ali-Zade, 1932
- † Choerina Brusina, 1882
- † Fossarulus Neumayr, 1869
- † Schuettemmericia Schlickum, 1961
- † Staadtiellopsis Schlickum, 1968
- † Zilchiola Kadolsky, 1993

Family names brought into synonymy

- Anabathronidae Coan, 1964: synonym of Anabathridae Keen, 1971
- Ansolidae Slavoshevskaya, 1975: synonym of Barleeiidae Gray, 1857
- Barleeidae Gray, 1857: synonym of Barleeiidae Gray, 1857
- Coxielladda Iredale and Whiteley, 1938: belongs to the family Pomatiopsidae
- † Ctyrokya Schlickum, 1965 : belongs to the family Hydrobiidae
- Gabbia Tryon, 1865: synonym of Bithynia (Gabbia) Tryon, 1865, alternate representation of Bithynia Leach, 1818
- Rissoidea: misspelling of Rissooidea

== Nomenclature ==
The Rissooidea family was previously known as Rissoacea. Prior to the recent ruling by the ICZN, many invertebrate superfamily names ended in the suffix -acea, or -aceae, not -oidea as now required according to ICZN article 29.2. The suffix -oidea was formerly used for some subclasses and superorders, where it is still found. In much of the older literature, including Keen 1958, Moore et al. 1952, and the Treatise on Invertebrate Paleontology, gastropod superfamilies are written with the suffix -acea.
