= Baicaliidae =

Scientific classification
- Kingdom: Animalia
- Phylum: Mollusca
- Class: Gastropoda
- Subclass: Caenogastropoda
- Order: Littorinimorpha
- Superfamily: Truncatelloidea
- Family: Baicaliidae; P. Fischer, 1885

Synonyms
- Baicaliinae P. Fischer, 1885 superseded rank; Limnoreidae B. Dybowski, 1911 (invalid: type genus a junior homonym); Liobaicaliinae B. Dybowski & Grochmalicki, 1913; Turribaicaliinae B. Dybowski & Grochmalicki, 1917

Family of gastropods

Baicaliidae is a family of small freshwater snails with a gill and an operculum, aquatic gastropod mollusks in the superfamily Truncatelloidea.

== Description ==
(Original description in French) The foot is simple.The central tooth of the radula lacks basal denticulations. The penis is non-bifid. The operculum is corneous and spiral (type genus: Baicalia).

== Genera ==
- Baicalia Martens, 1876
- Dybowskia Dall, 1877: synonym of Teratobaikalia Lindholm, 1909
- Godlewskia Crosse & P. Fischer, 1879
- Korotnewia Kozhov, 1936
- Liobaicalia Martens, 1876, synonymised with:
- Maackia Clessin, 1880, synoynmised with:
- Parabaikalia Lindholm, 1909
- Pseudobaikalia Lindholm, 1909, synonymised with:
- Pyrgobaicalia Starobogatov, 1972
- Teratobaikalia Lindholm, 1909, synonymised with:
