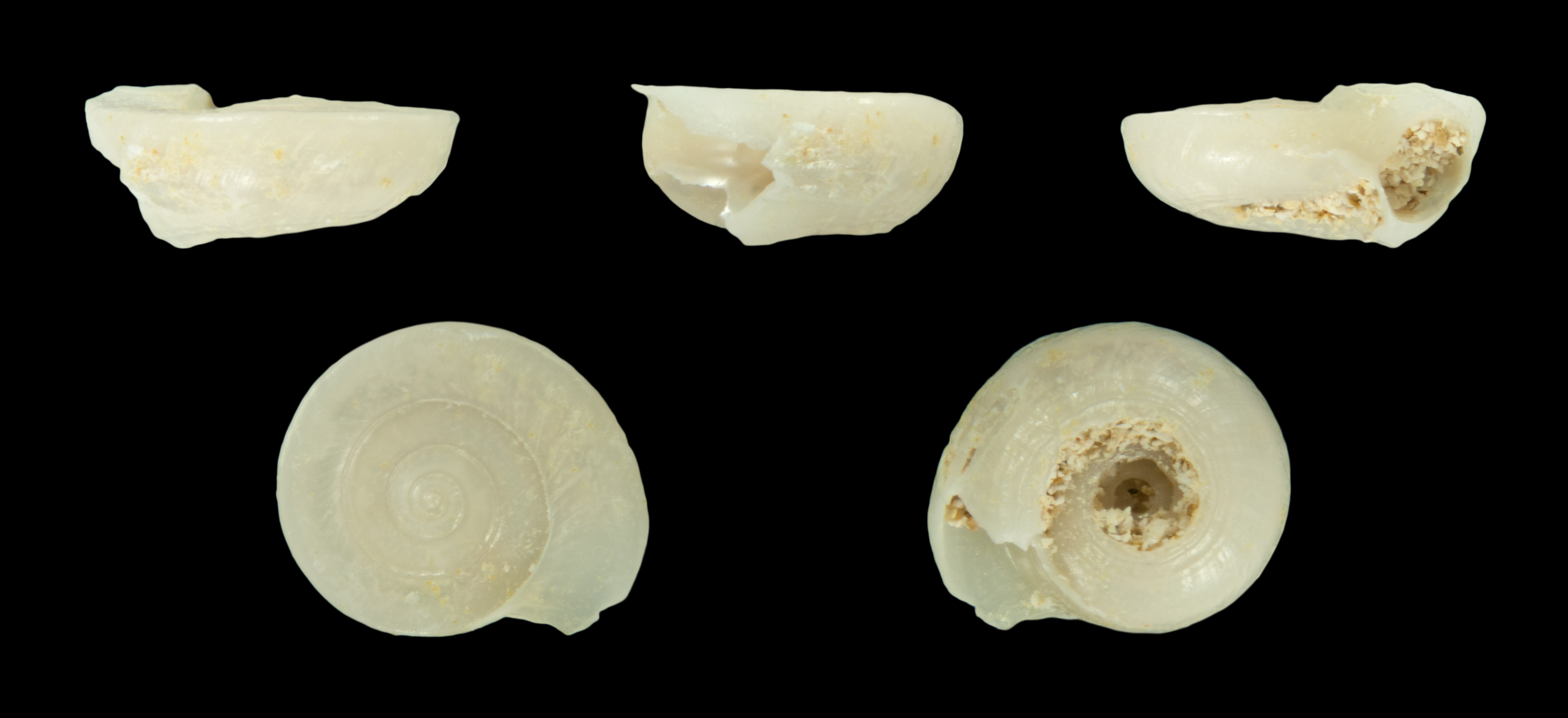
- Omalaxis cresnensis (Morlet, 1885)

Scientific classification
- Kingdom: Animalia
- Phylum: Mollusca
- Class: Gastropoda
- Subclass: Caenogastropoda
- Order: Littorinimorpha
- Superfamily: Vanikoroidea
- Family: †Omalaxidae; Cossmann, 1916

= Omalaxidae =

Extinct family of gastropods

†Omalaxidae is an extinct family of sea snails, marine gastropod molluscs in the clade Littorinimorpha.
