= Mesocochliopidae =

Scientific classification
- Kingdom: Animalia
- Phylum: Mollusca
- Class: Gastropoda
- Subclass: Caenogastropoda
- Order: Littorinimorpha
- Superfamily: Rissooidea
- Family: †Mesocochliopidae; Yu, 1987

Extinct family of gastropods

Mesocochliopidae is an extinct family of fossil sea snails, marine gastropod molluscs in the superfamily Rissooidea.

== Genera ==
Genera within the family Mesocochliopidae include:

- Mesocochliopa, the type genus
