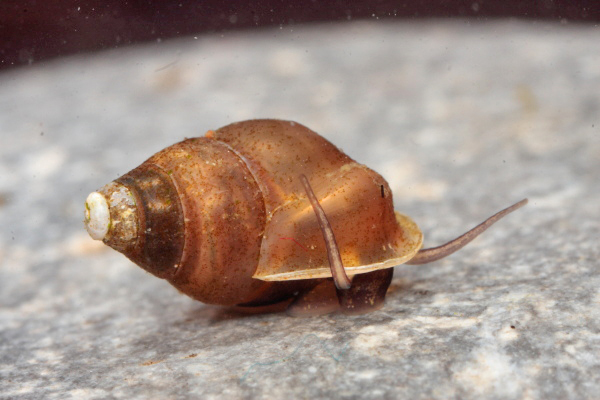

Scientific classification
- Kingdom: Animalia
- Phylum: Mollusca
- Class: Gastropoda
- Subclass: Caenogastropoda
- Order: Littorinimorpha
- Family: Amnicolidae
- Genus: Emmericia; Brusina, 1870

Species
- See text.

= Emmericia =

Genus of gastropods

Emmericia is a genus of very small freshwater snails which have an operculum, aquatic gastropod mollusks in the family Amnicolidae, according to the taxonomy of the Gastropoda (Bouchet & Rocroi, 2005).

Emmericia is the type genus of the subfamily Emmericiinae.

== Species ==
Species in the genus Emmericia include:

- Emmericia narentana Bourguignat, 1880
- Emmericia patula (Brumati, 1838) - type species
