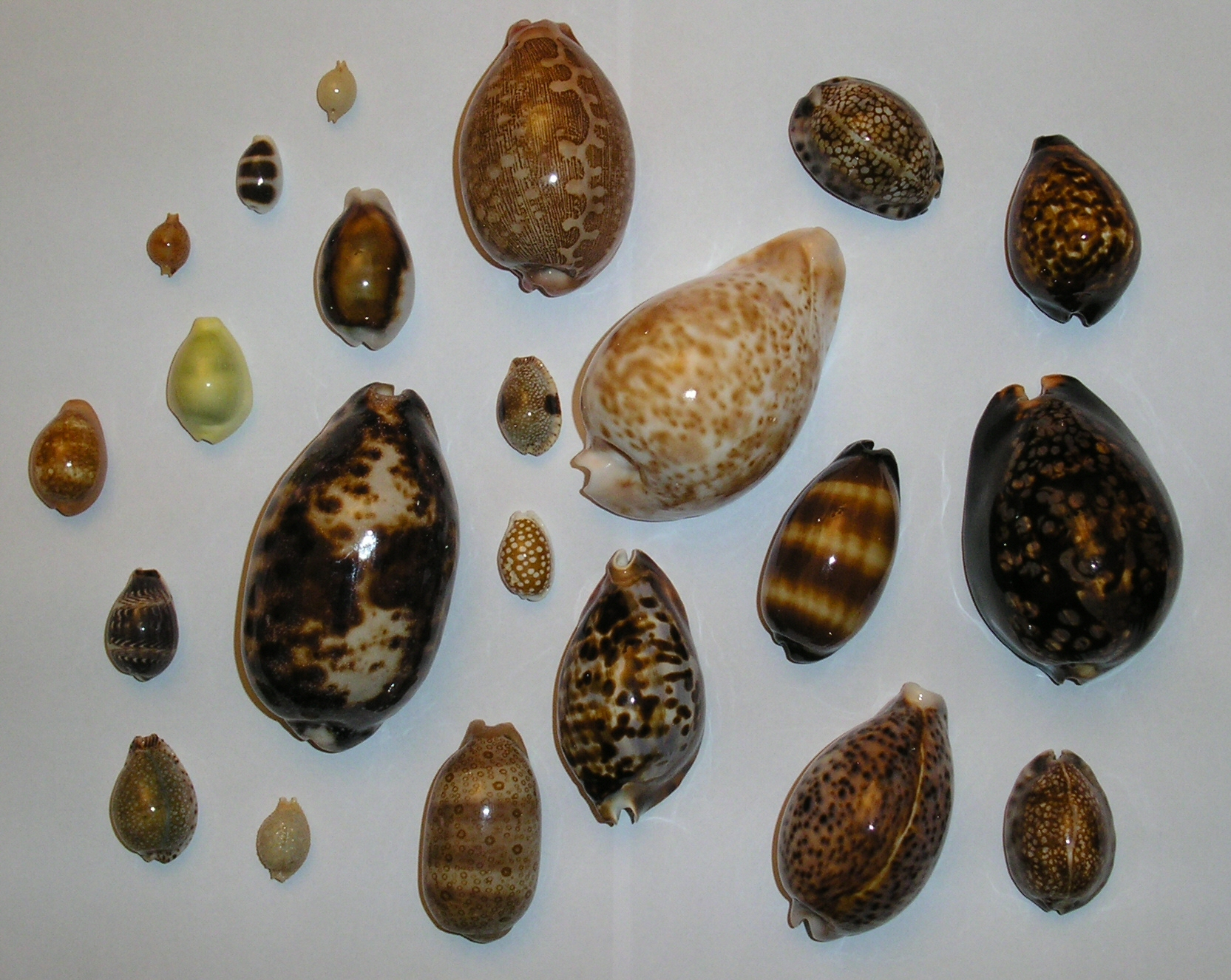
- A group of shells of species of cowries, family Cypraeidae, anterior ends towards the top of the image.

Scientific classification
- Kingdom: Animalia
- Phylum: Mollusca
- Class: Gastropoda
- Subclass: Caenogastropoda
- Order: Littorinimorpha; Golikov & Starobogatov, 1975

Superfamilies
- See text

= Littorinimorpha =

Order of gastropods

Littorinimorpha is a large order of snails, gastropods, consisting primarily of sea snails (marine species), but also including some freshwater snails (limnic species) and land snails (terrestrial species).

Previously, the Linnaean taxonomy used in the taxonomy of the Gastropoda by Ponder & Lindberg (1997) ranked like this: subclass Orthogastropoda, superorder Caenogastropoda, order Sorbeoconcha, suborder Hypsogastropoda, infraorder Littorinimorpha.

The order Littorinimorpha contains many gastropod families that were formerly placed in the order Mesogastropoda, as introduced by J. Thiele in his work from 1921. Evidence for this group being monophyletic is scanty. In 2003, E. E. Strong suggested using only Neogastropoda as a clade within the clade Hypsogastropoda, and to include the unresolved superfamilies of the Hypsogastropoda within the Littorinimorpha.

Littorinimorpha is paraphyletic, as the superfamilies Calyptraeoidea, Capuloidea, Cypraeoidea, Ficoidea, Tonnoidea, and Velutinoidea are members of the clade Latrogastropoda and are more closely related to neogastropods than other littorinimorphs. As such, "littorinimorph" has been considered an informal term for non-neogastropod hypsogastropods. It is possible that a restricted concept of Littorinimorpha that excludes latrogastropods is monophyletic, but this is uncertain. There are some consistent clades within Littorinimorpha, such as a clade uniting Littorinidae, Naticoidea, and Pterotracheoidea, and a clade uniting Rissooidea, Truncatelloidea, and Vanikoroidea.

== Superfamilies and families ==
The superfamilies grouped in this order include a few families that are well-known based on their shells:

- Calyptraeoidea Lamarck, 1809
  - Calyptraeidae Lamarck, 1809, the slipper shells
- Capuloidea Fleming, 1822
  - Capulidae Fleming, 1822, the cap shells (junior synonym Trichotropidae)
- Cingulopsoidea Fretter & Patil, 1958
  - Cingulopsidae Fretter & Patil, 1958
  - Eatoniellidae Ponder, 1965
  - Rastodentidae Ponder, 1966
- Cypraeoidea Rafinesque, 1815
  - Cypraeidae Rafinesque, 1815, the cowries
  - Ovulidae Fleming, 1822
  - Eratoidae Gill, 1871
  - Triviidae Troschel, 1863
  - Velutinidae Gray, 1840
- Ficoidea Meek, 1864, the fig shells
  - Ficidae Meek, 1864, the fig shells
- Hipponicoidea Troschel, 1861
  - Hipponicidae Troschel, 1861
- Littorinoidea Children, 1834
  - Aciculidae Gray, 1850
  - Littorinidae, Children, 1834 the periwinkles
  - † Bohaispiridae Youluo, 1978
  - Pickworthiidae Iredale, 1917
    - Subfamily Pickworthiinae Iredale, 1917
    - Subfamily Pelycidiinae Ponder & Hall, 1983
    - Subfamily Sherborniinae Iredale, 1917
  - Pomatiidae Newton, 1891 (1828)
    - Subfamily Pomatiinae Newton, 1891
    - Subfamily Annulariinae Henderson & Bartsch, 1920
  - † Purpurinidae Zittel, 1895
  - Skeneopsidae Iredale, 1915
  - † Tripartellidae Gründel, 2001
  - Zerotulidae Warén & Hain, 1996
- Naticoidea Guilding, 1834
  - Naticidae Guilding, 1834, the moon snails
- Pterotracheoidea Rafinesque, 1814 - synonym: Heteropoda.
  - Pterotracheidae Rafinesque, 1814
  - Atlantidae Rang, 1829
  - † Bellerophinidae Destombes, 1984
  - Carinariidae Blainville, 1818
- Rissooidea Gray, 1847
  - Barleeiidae Gray, 1857
  - Bithyniidae Gray, 1857
  - Emblandidae Ponder, 1985
  - Helicostoidae Pruvot-Fol, 1937
  - † Mesocochliopidae Yu, 1987
  - † Palaeorissoinidae Gründel & Kowalke, 2002
    - Subfamily Palaeorissoininae Gründel & Kowalke, 2002
    - Subfamily Greveniellinae Gründel & Kowalke, 2002
  - Rissoidae Gray, 1847
  - Rissoinidae Stimpson, 1865
- Stromboidea Rafinesque, 1815
  - Aporrhaidae Gray, 1850, the pelican's foot shells
    - Subfamily Aporrhainae Gray, 1850
    - Subfamily Arrhoginae Popenoe, 1983
    - † Subfamily Harpagodinae Pchelintsev, 1963
    - † Subfamily Perissopterinae Korotkov, 1992
    - † Subfamily Spinigerinae Korotkov, 1992 (inv.)
  - † Colombellinidae P. Fischer, 1884
  - † Pugnellidae Kiel & Bandel, 1999
  - Seraphsidae Gray, 1853
  - Strombidae Rafinesque, 1815, the true conchs
  - Struthiolariidae Gabb, 1868. the ostrich foot shells
  - † Thersiteidae Savornin, 1915
  - † Tylostomatidae Stoliczka, 1868
- Tonnoidea Suter, 1913 (1825)
  - Bursidae Thiele, 1925, the frog shells
  - Cassidae Latreille, 1825, the helmet shells or bonnet shells
  - Laubierinidae Warén & Bouchet, 1990
  - Personidae Gray, 1854
  - Pisanianuridae Warén & Bouchet, 1990
  - Ranellidae Gray, 1854, the tritons
  - Tonnidae Suter, 1913 (1825), the tun shells
- Truncatelloidea
  - Amnicolidae Tryon, 1863
    - Subfamily Amnicolinae Tryon, 1863
    - Subfamily Baicaliinae P. Fischer, 1885
    - Subfamily Emmericiinae Brusina, 1870
  - Anabathridae Keen, 1971
  - Assimineidae H. Adams & A. Adams, 1856
  - Bythinellidae Locard, 1893
  - Caecidae Gray, 1850
  - Calopiidae Ponder, 1999
  - Clenchiellidae D. W. Taylor, 1966
  - Cochliopidae Tryon, 1866
    - Subfamily Cocliopinae Tryon, 1866
    - Subfamily Littoridininae Thiele, 1928
    - Subfamily Semisalsinae Giusti & Pezzoli, 1980
  - Elachisinidae Ponder, 1985
  - Emmericiidae Brusina, 1870
  - Epigridae Ponder, 1985
  - Falsicingulidae Slavoshevskaya
  - Fontigentidae D. W. Taylor, 1966
  - Hydrobiidae Stimpson, 1865
  - Hydrococcidae Thiele, 1928
  - Iravadiidae Thiele, 1928
  - Lithoglyphidae Tryon, 1866
  - Moitessieriidae Bourguignat, 1863
  - Pomatiopsidae Stimpson, 1865
    - Subfamily Pomatiopsinae Stimpson, 1865
      - Oncomelania
    - Subfamily Triculinae Annandale, 1924
  - Stenothyridae Tryon, 1866
  - Tateidae Thiele, 1925
  - Tornidae Sacco, 1896 (1884)
  - Truncatellidae Gray, 1840
    - Subfamily Truncatellinae Gray, 1840
    - Subfamily Geomelaniinae Kobelt & Möllendorff, 1897
- Vanikoroidea Gray, 1840
  - Haloceratidae Warén & Bouchet, 1991
  - Hipponicidae Troschel, 1861, the hoof shells
  - † Omalaxidae Cosmmann, 1916
  - Vanikoridae Gray, 1840
- Velutinoidea Gray, 1840
  - Pediculariidae
  - Triviidae Troschel, 1863, the trivias
  - Velutinidae Gray, 1840
    - Subfamily Velutininae Gray, 1840
    - Subfamily Lamellariinae d'Orbigny, 1841
- Vermetoidea Rafinesque, 1815
  - Vermetidae Rafinesque, 1815, the worm snails
- Xenophoroidea Troschel, 1852 (1840): synonym of Stromboidea Rafinesque, 1815
  - † Lamelliphoridae Korobkov, 1960
  - Xenophoridae Troschel, 1852 (1840), the carrier shells

(Extinct taxa indicated by a dagger, †.)

Families brought into synonymy

- Adeorbidae Monterosato, 1884: synonym of Tornidae Sacco, 1896 (1884)
- Paludestrinidae Newton, 1891 accepted as Hydrobiidae Stimpson, 1865
- Pyrgulidae Brusina, 1882 (1869) accepted as Hydrobiidae Stimpson, 1865
- Vitrinellidae Bush, 1897 accepted as Tornidae Sacco, 1896 (1884)
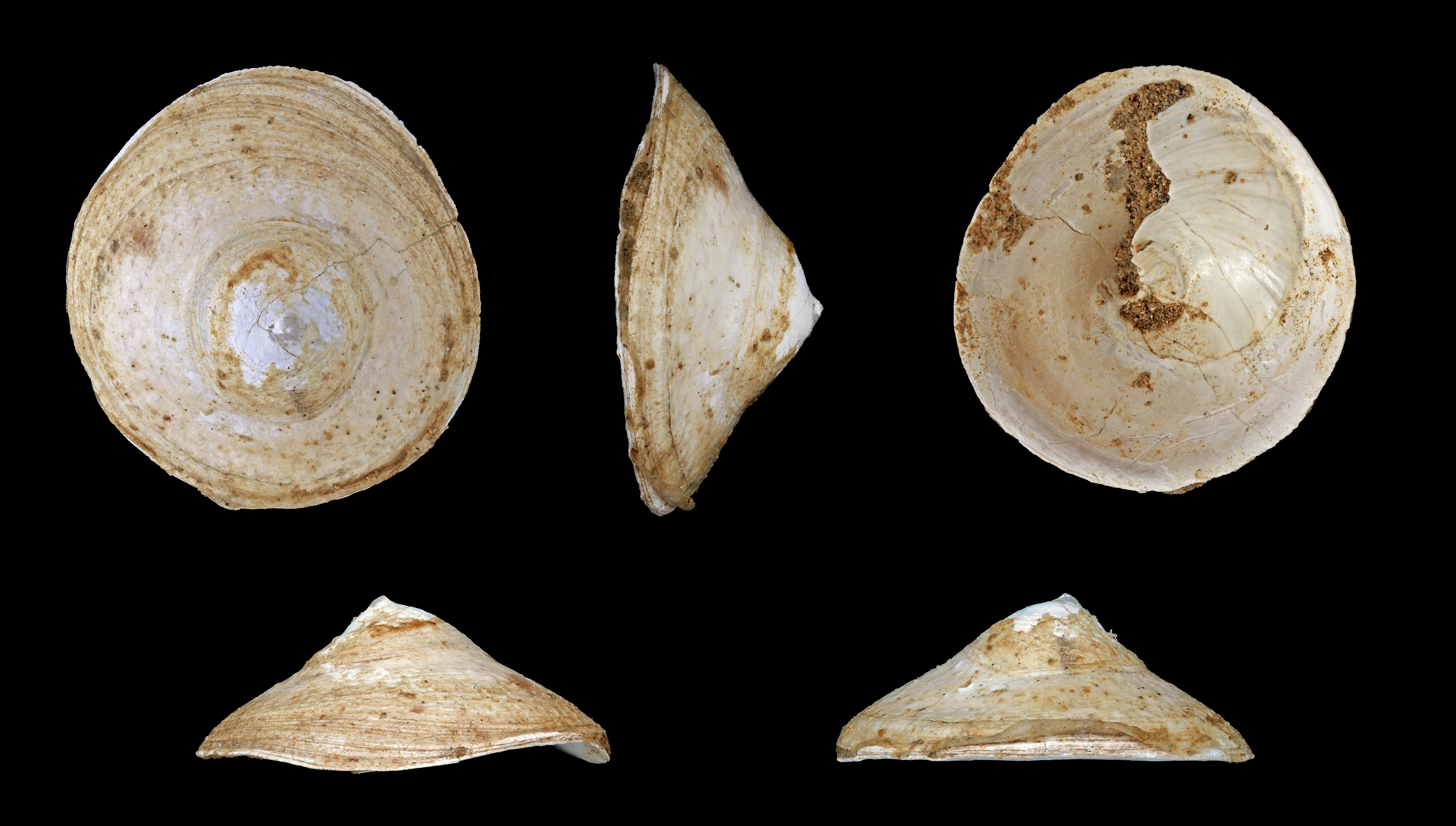
Calyptraea chinensis (Calyptraeidae)

Cypraea tigris (Cypraeidae)

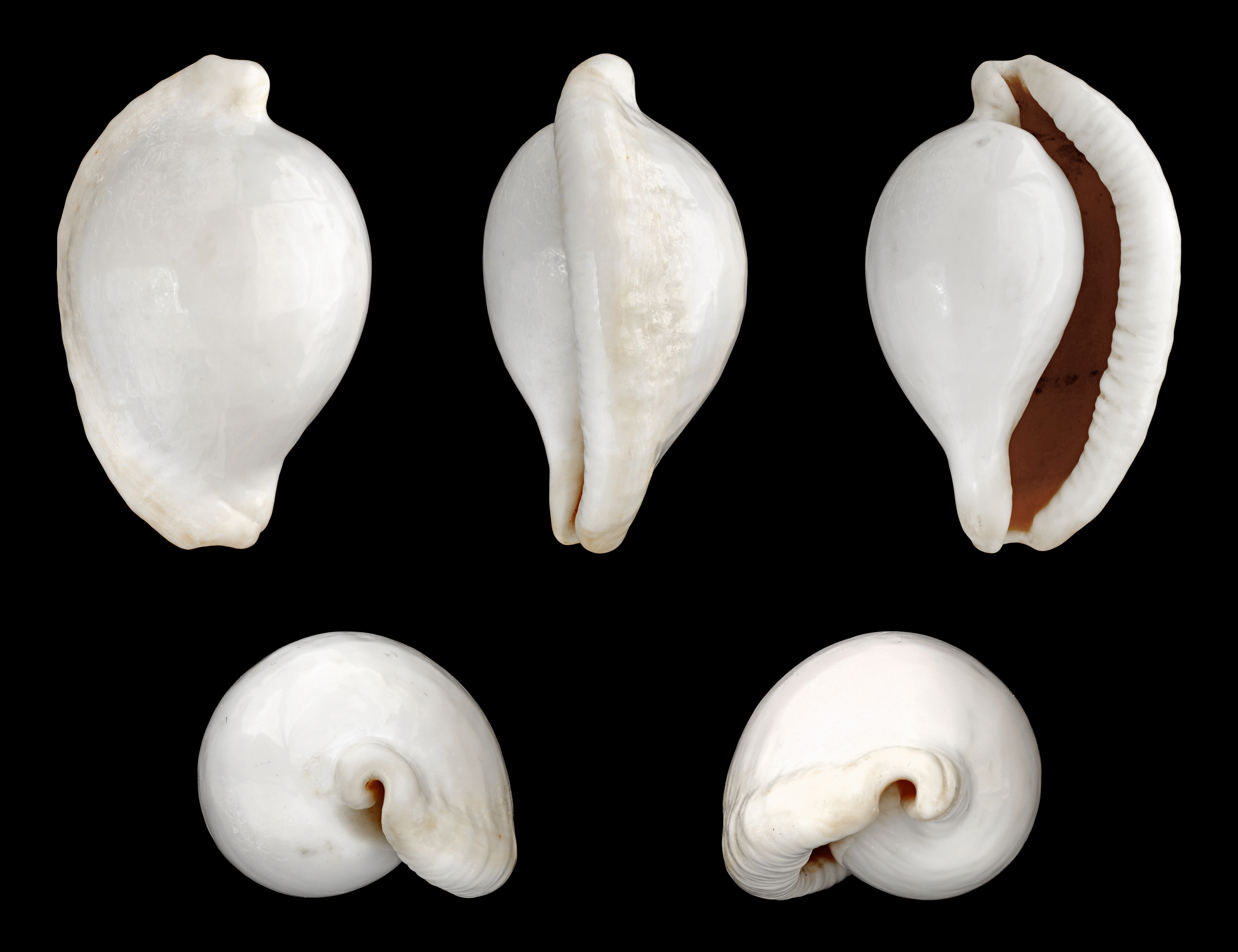
Ovula ovum (Ovulidae)

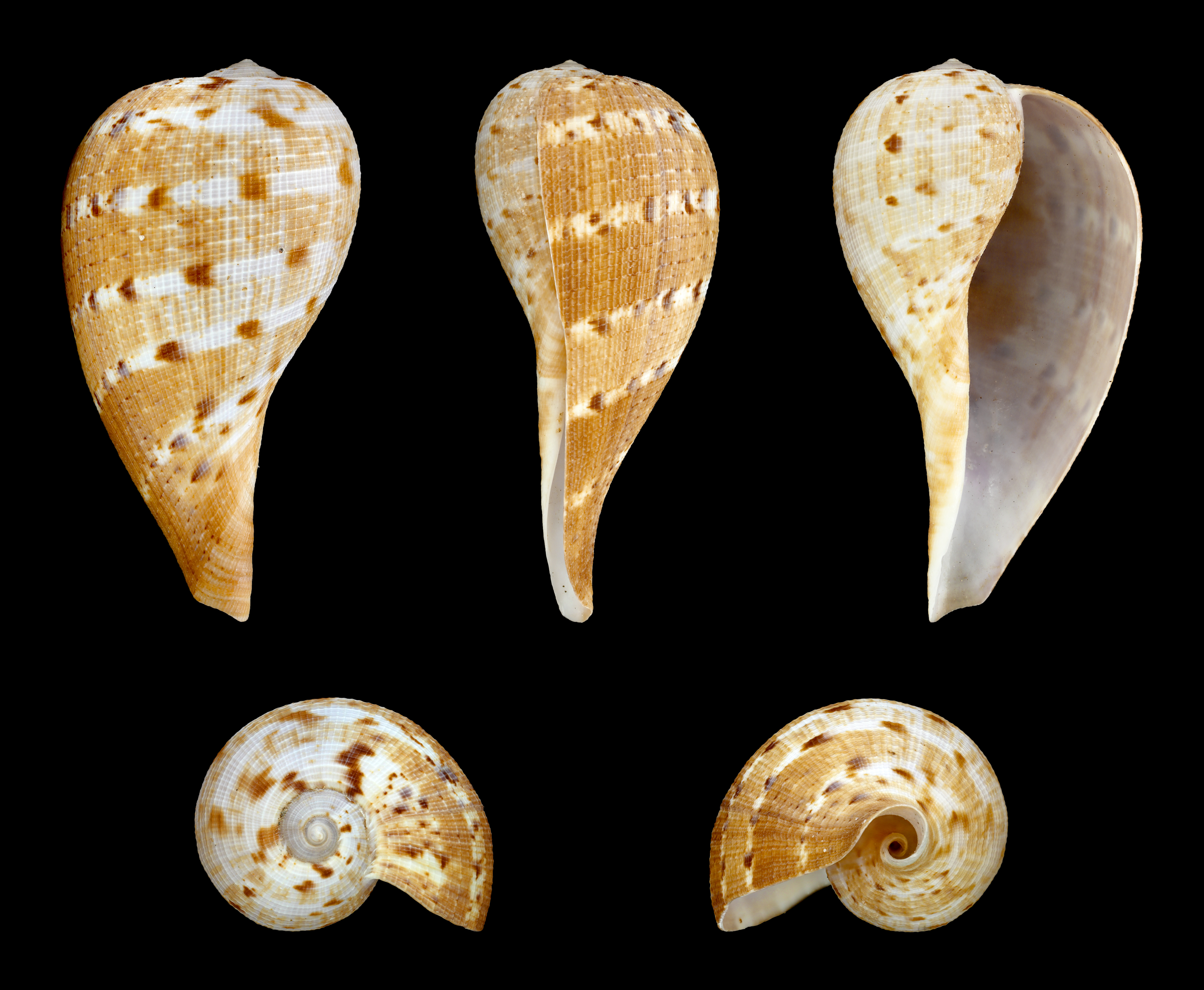
Ficus ficus (Ficidae)

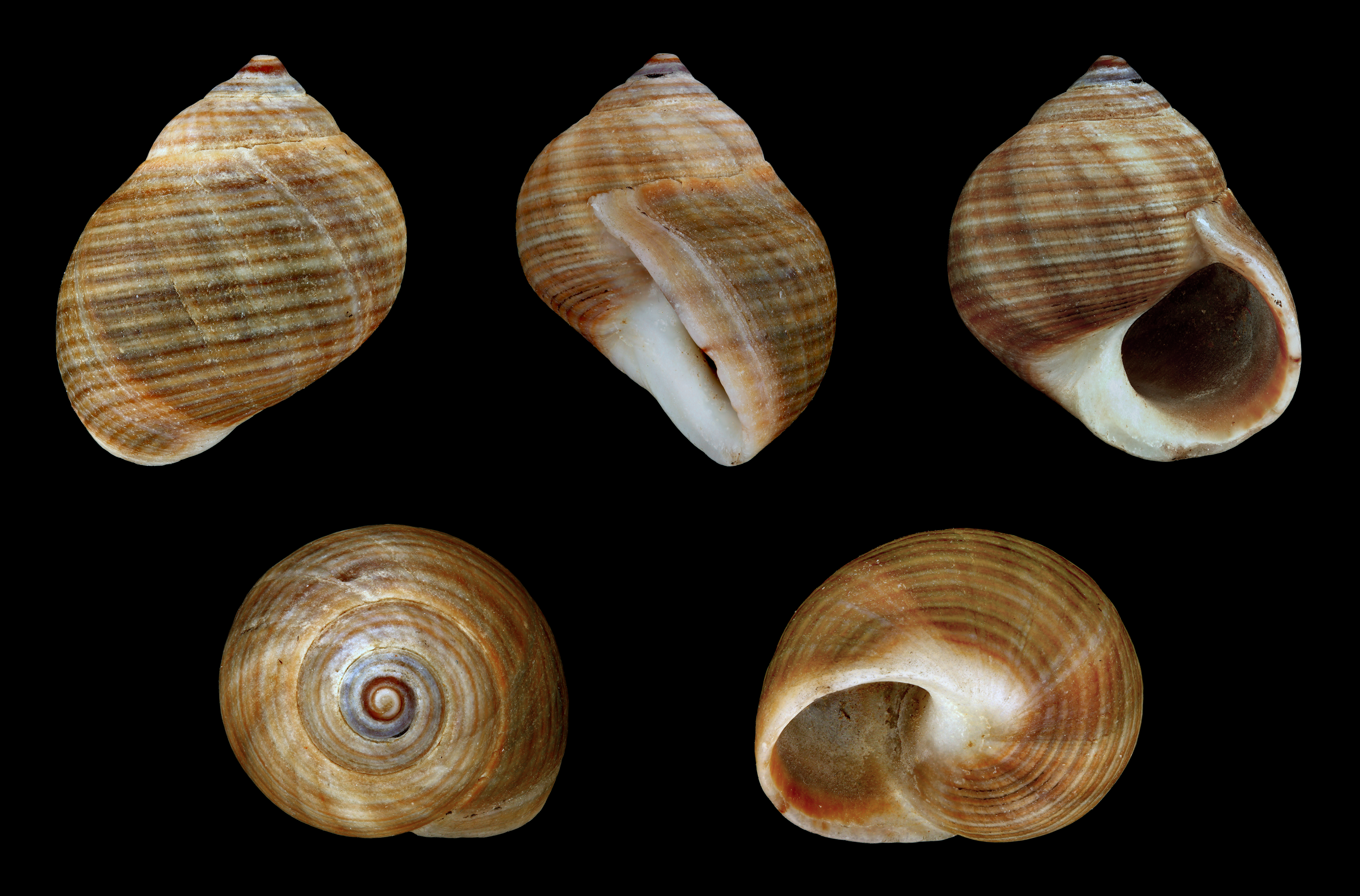
Littorina littorea (Littorinidae)

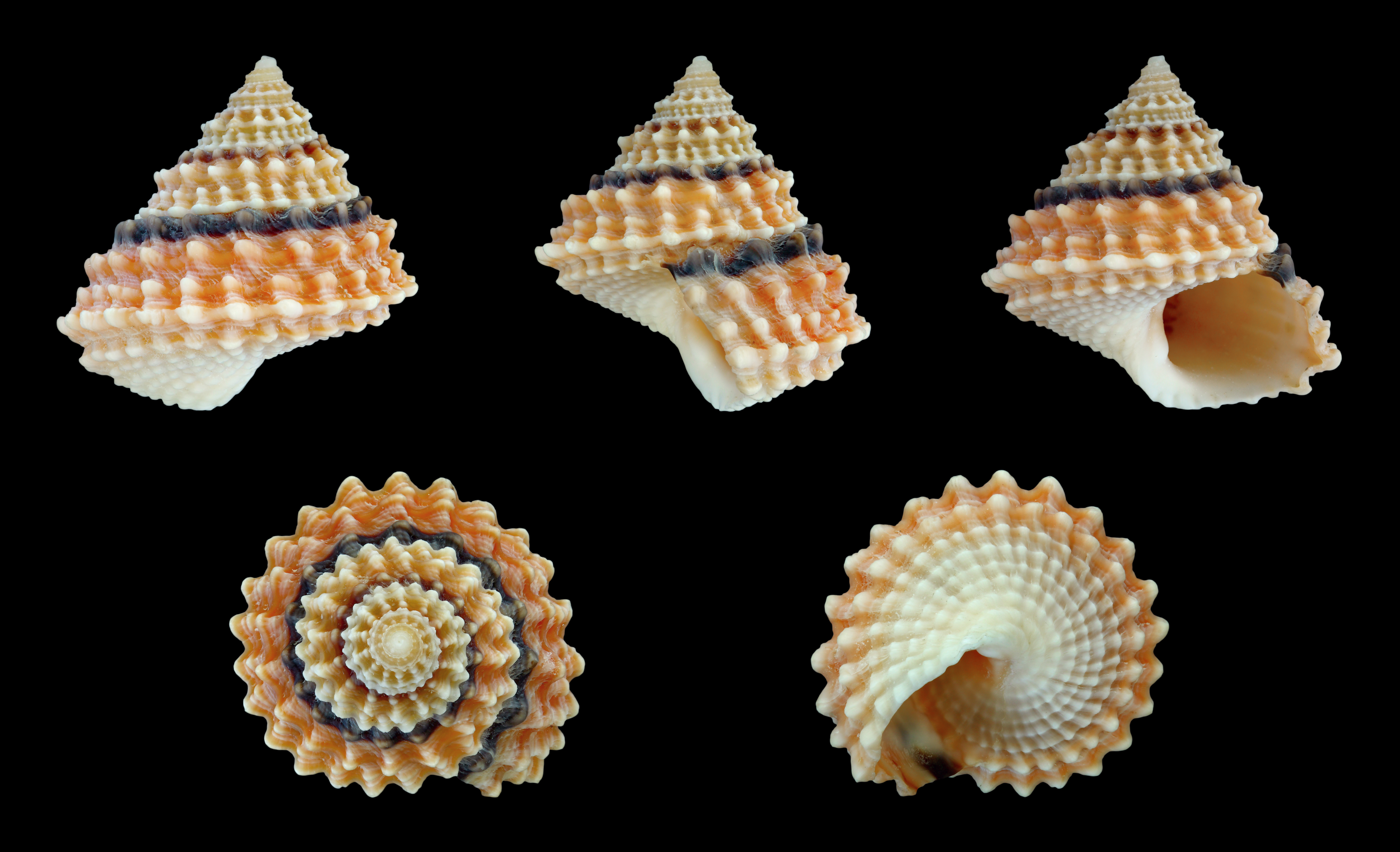
Tectarius coronatus (Littorinidae)

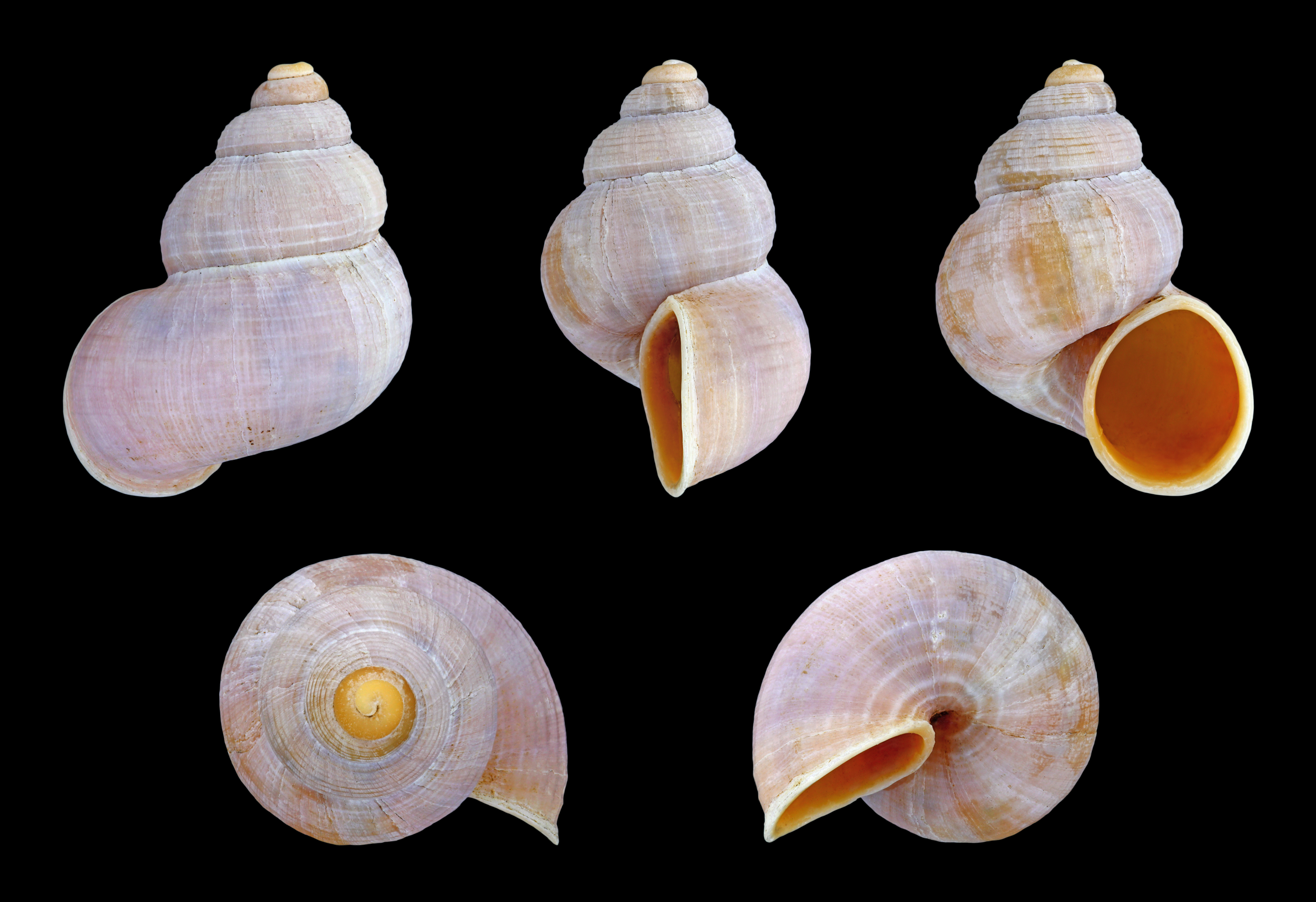
Tudorella sulcata (Pomatiidae)

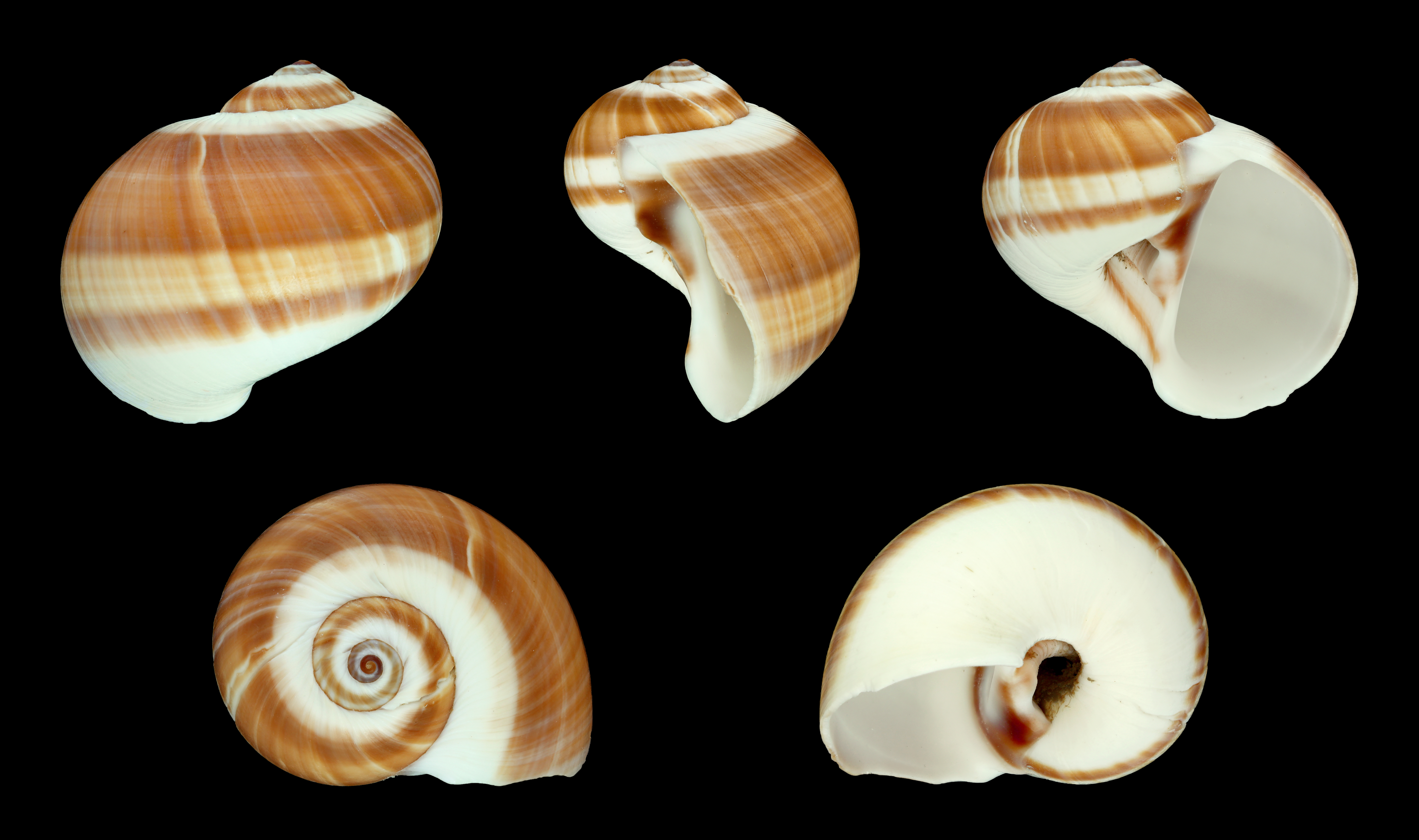
Natica vitellus (Naticidae)

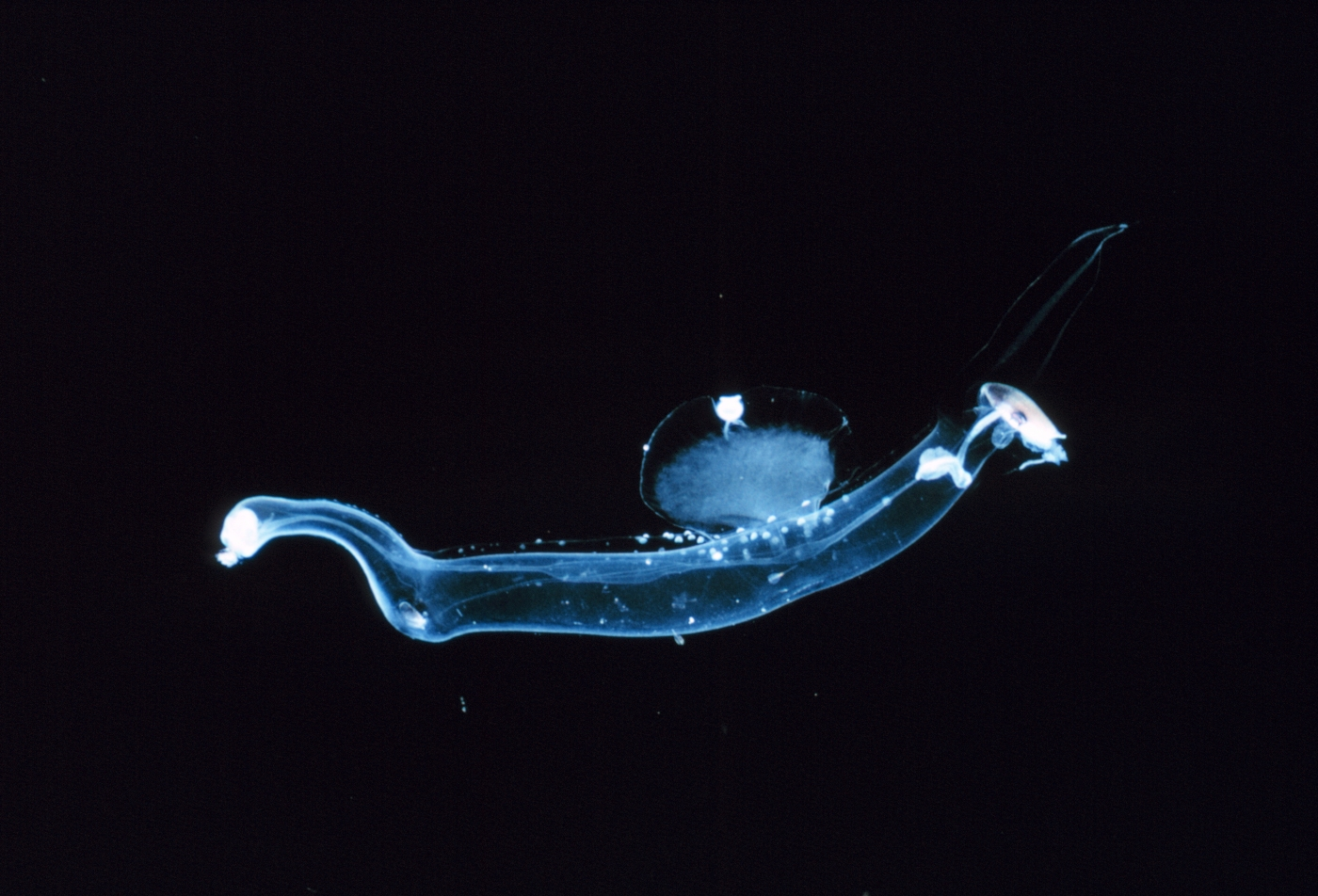
Pterotracheidae spp.

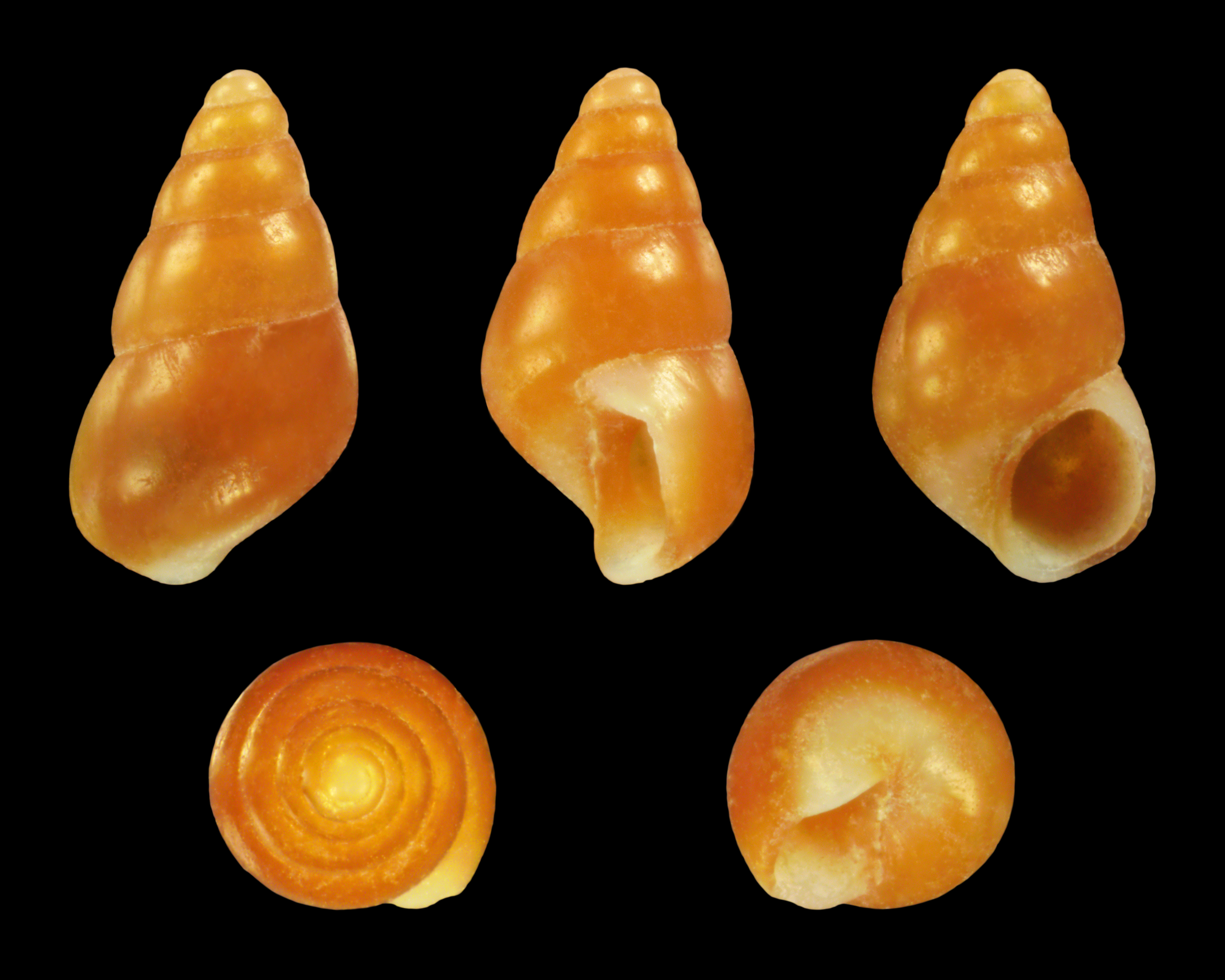
Barleeia unifasciata (Barleeiidae)

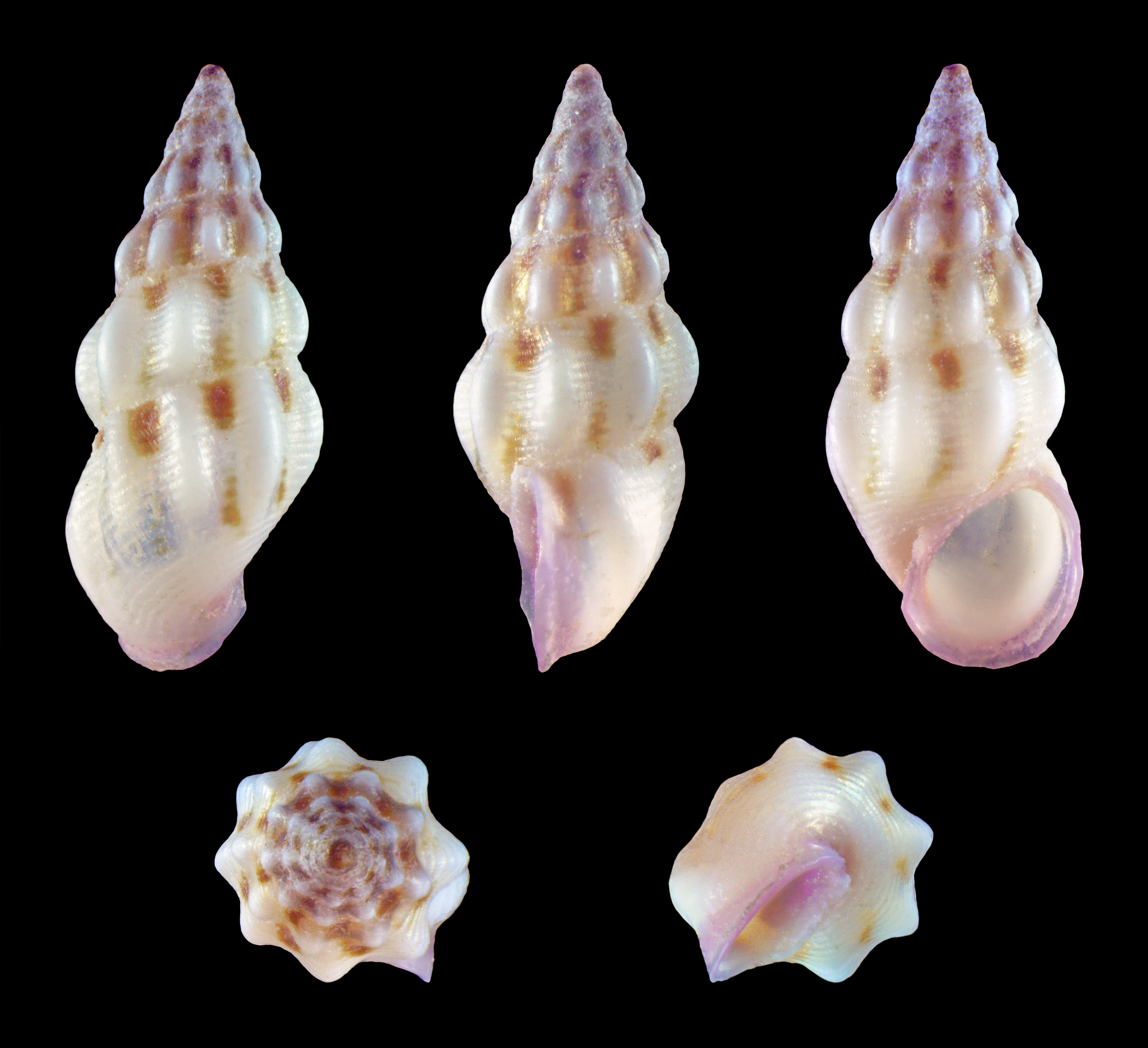
Rissoa decorata (Rissoidae)

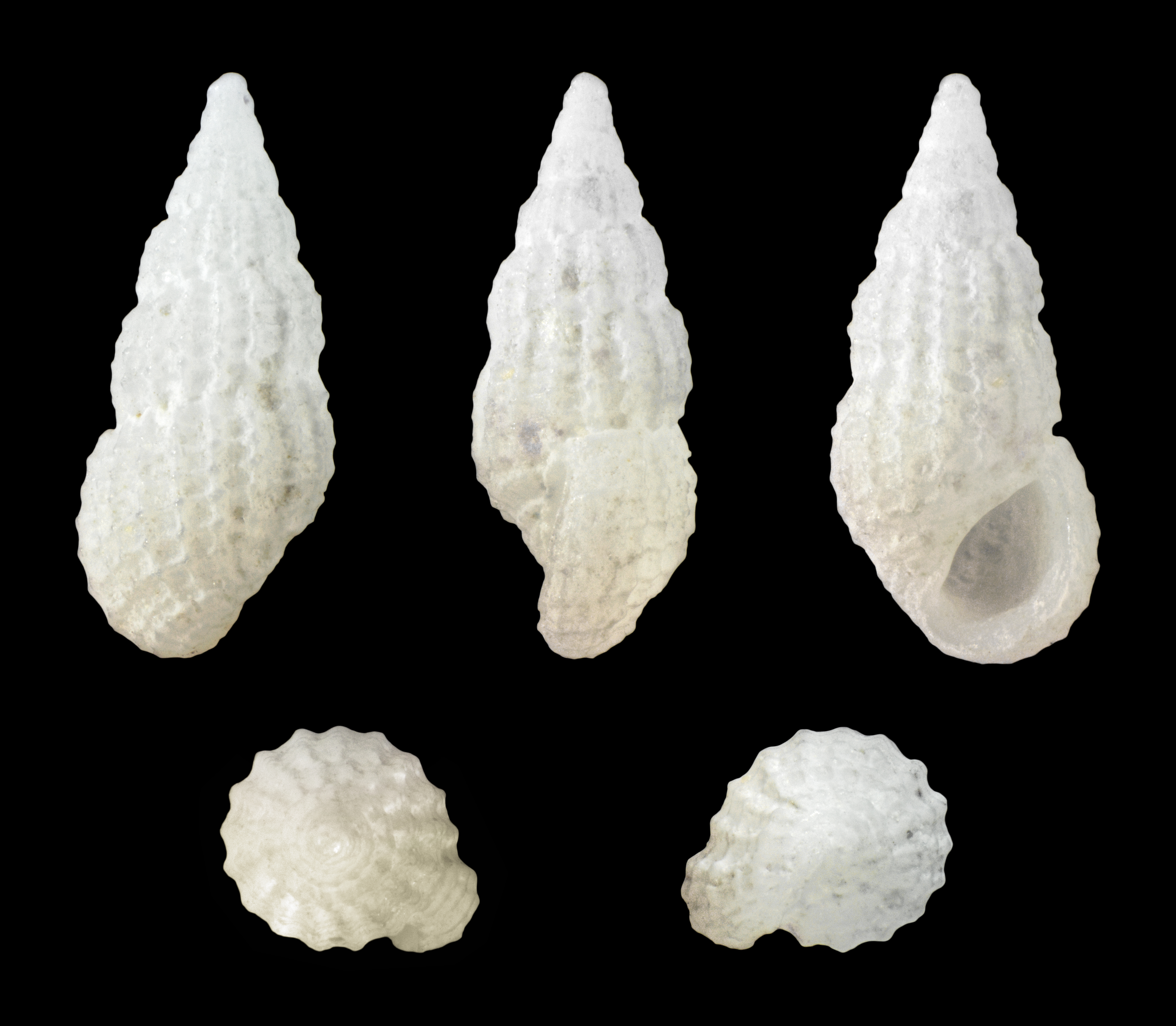
Rissoina tornatilis (Rissoinidae)

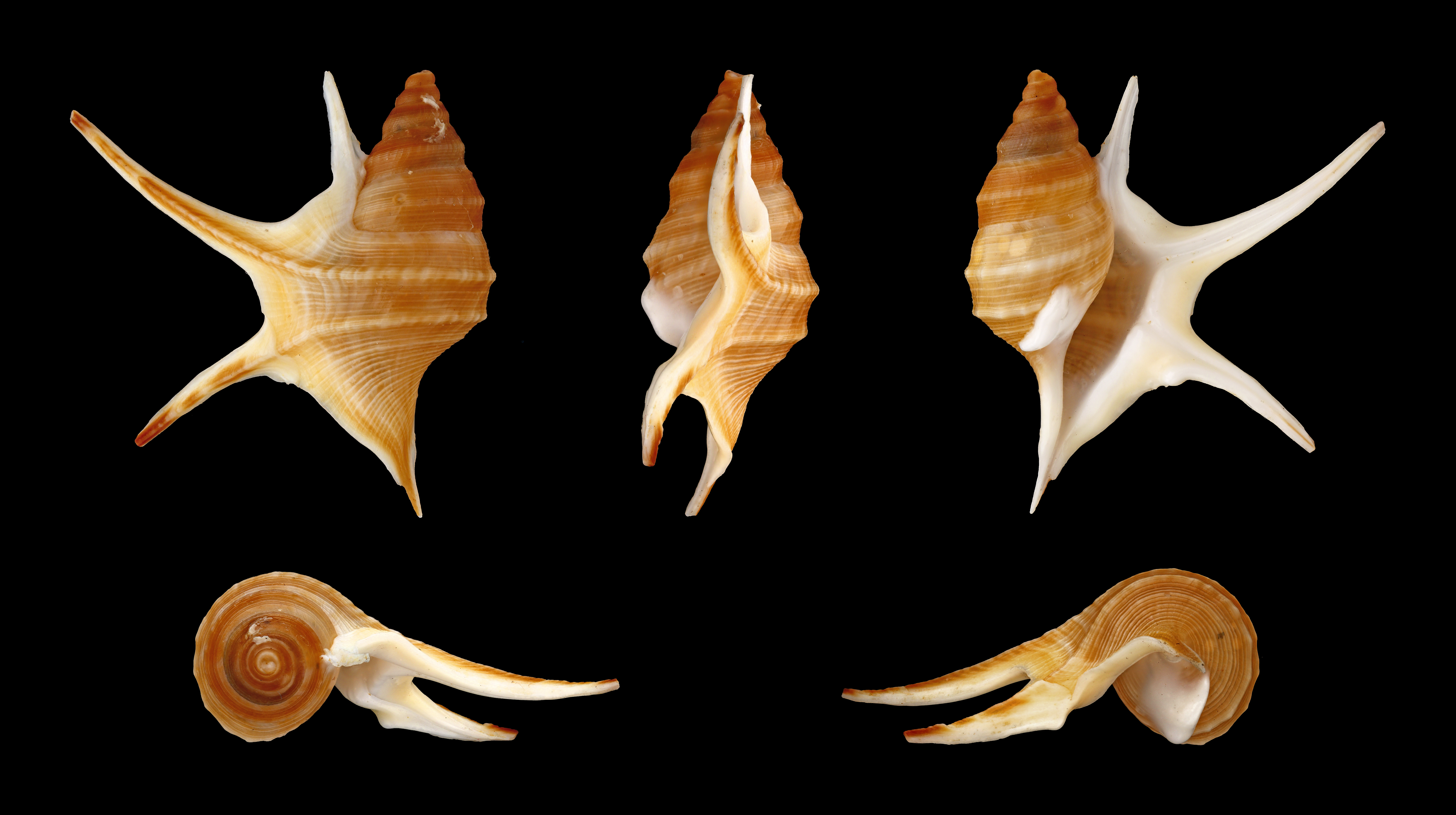
Aporrhais pesgallinae (Aporrhaidae)

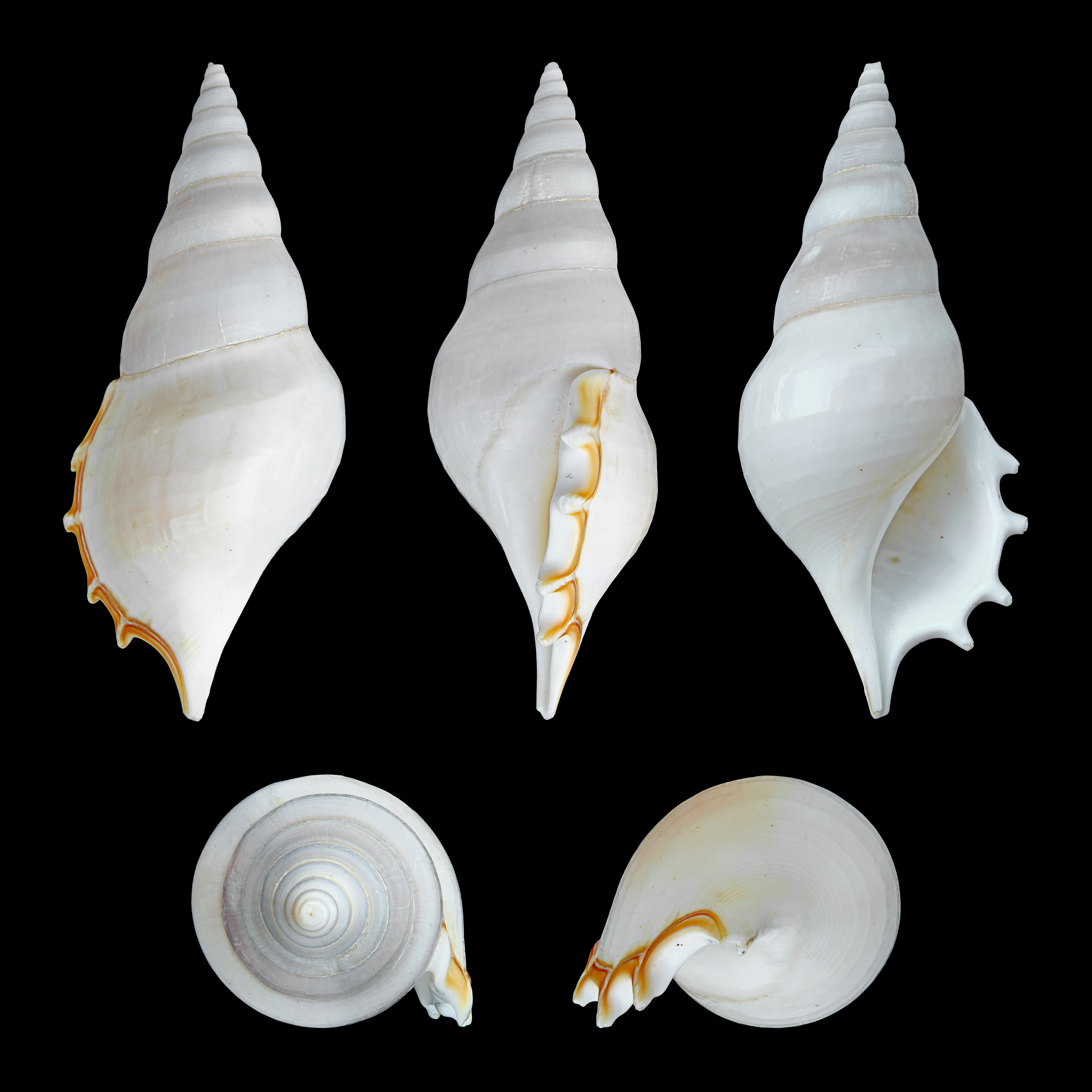
Rostellariella delicatula (Rostellariidae)

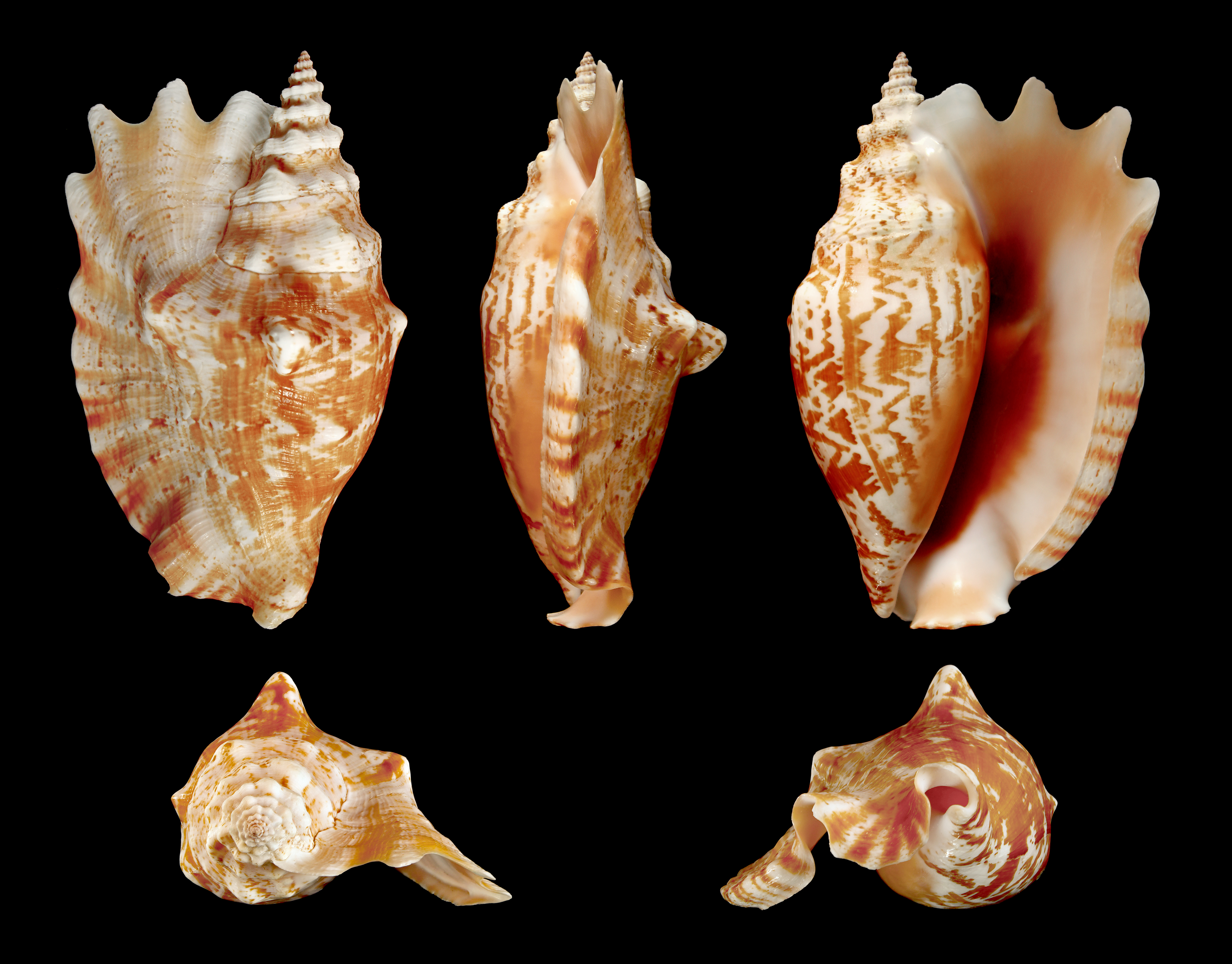
Sinustrombus sinuatus (Strombidae)

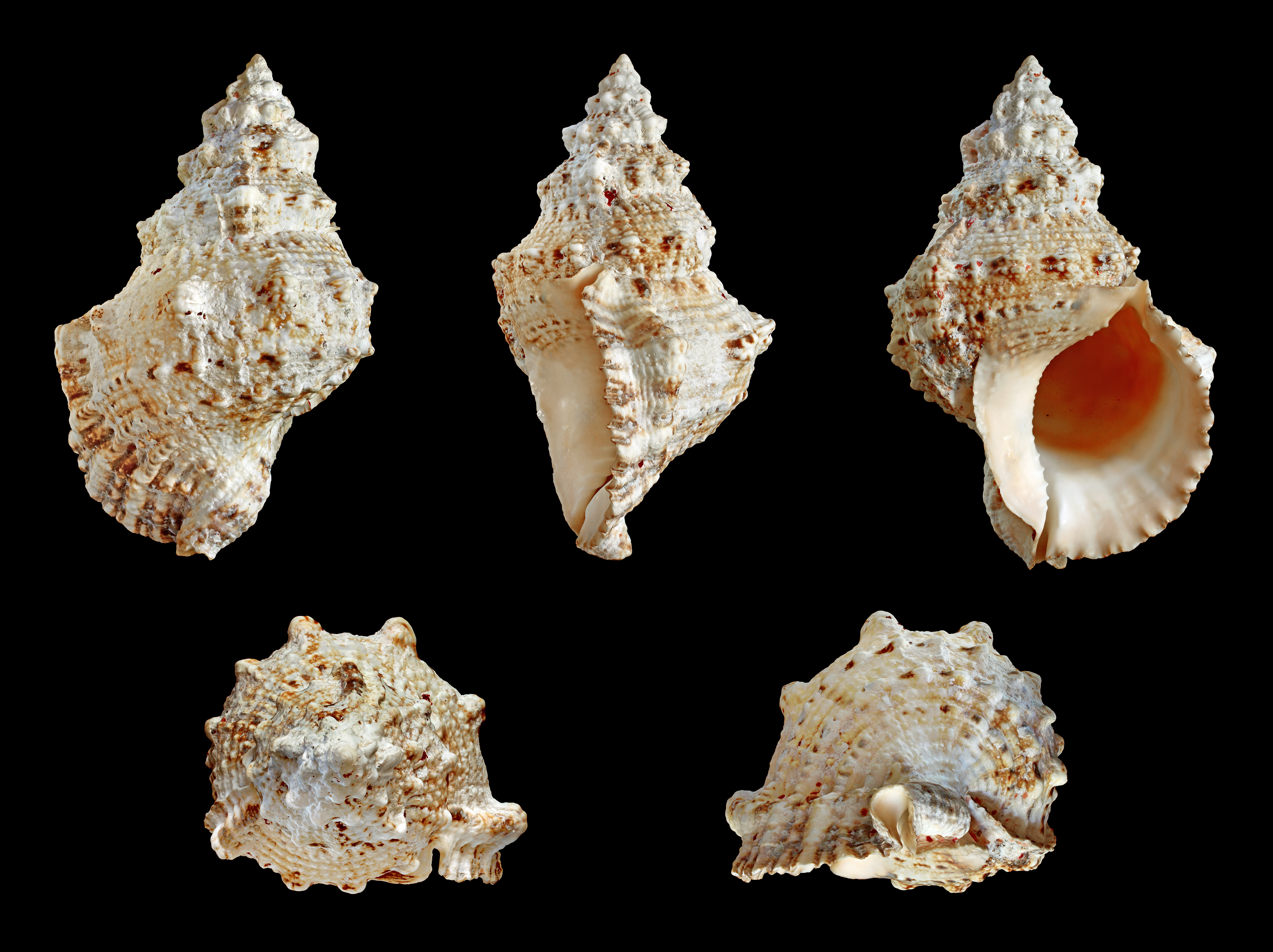
Tutufa bubo (Bursidae)

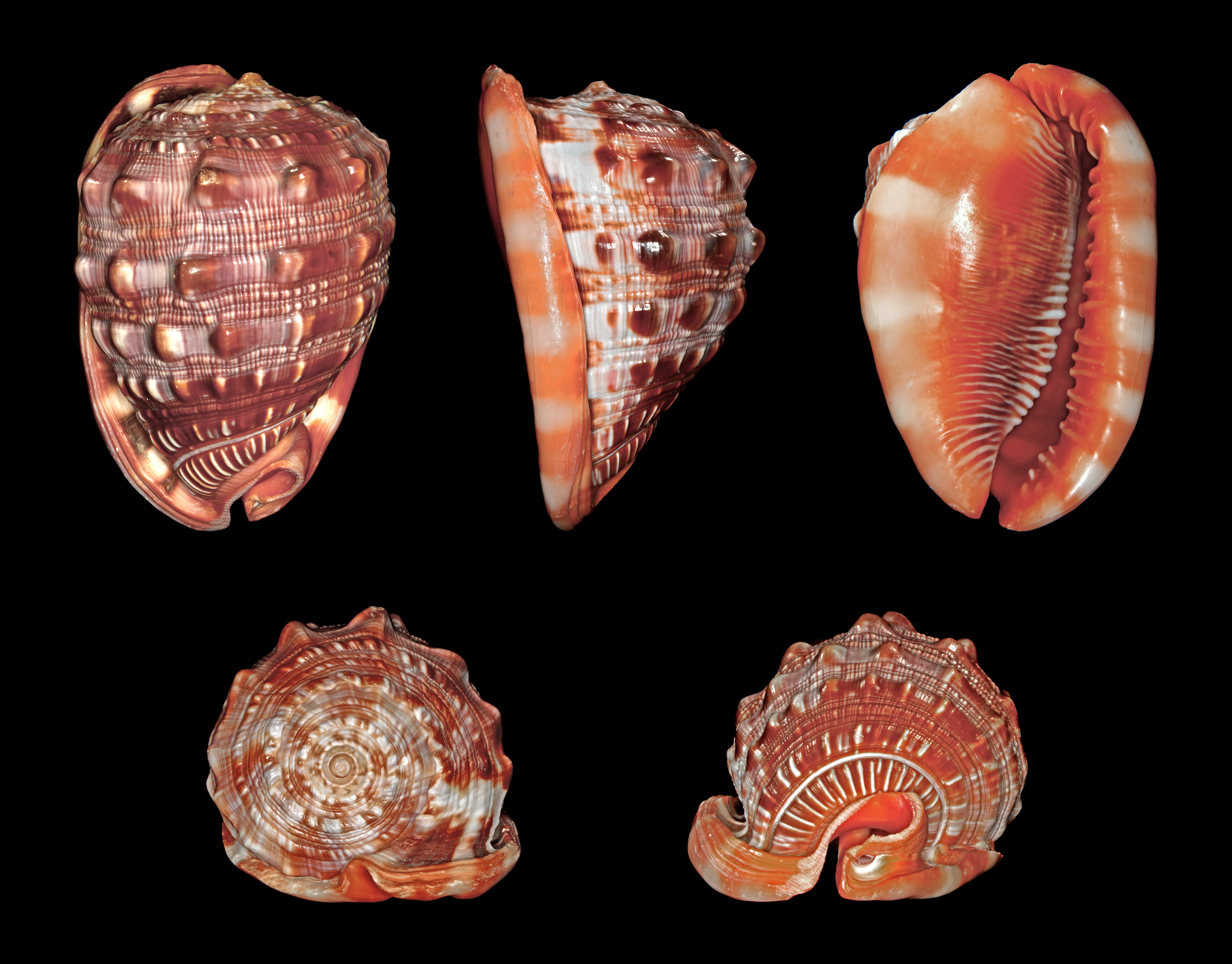
Cypraecassis rufa (Cassidae)

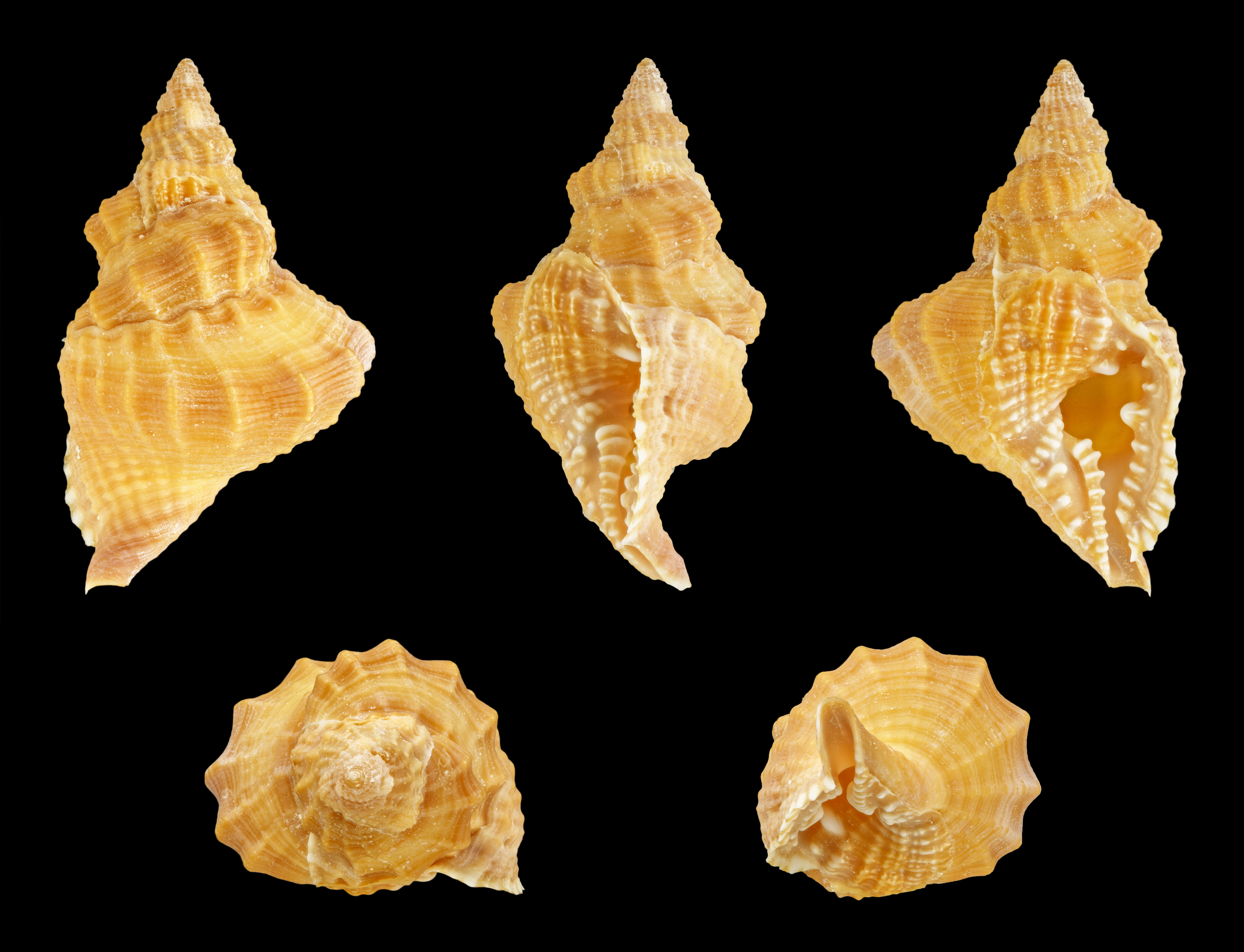
Distorsio kurzi (Personidae)

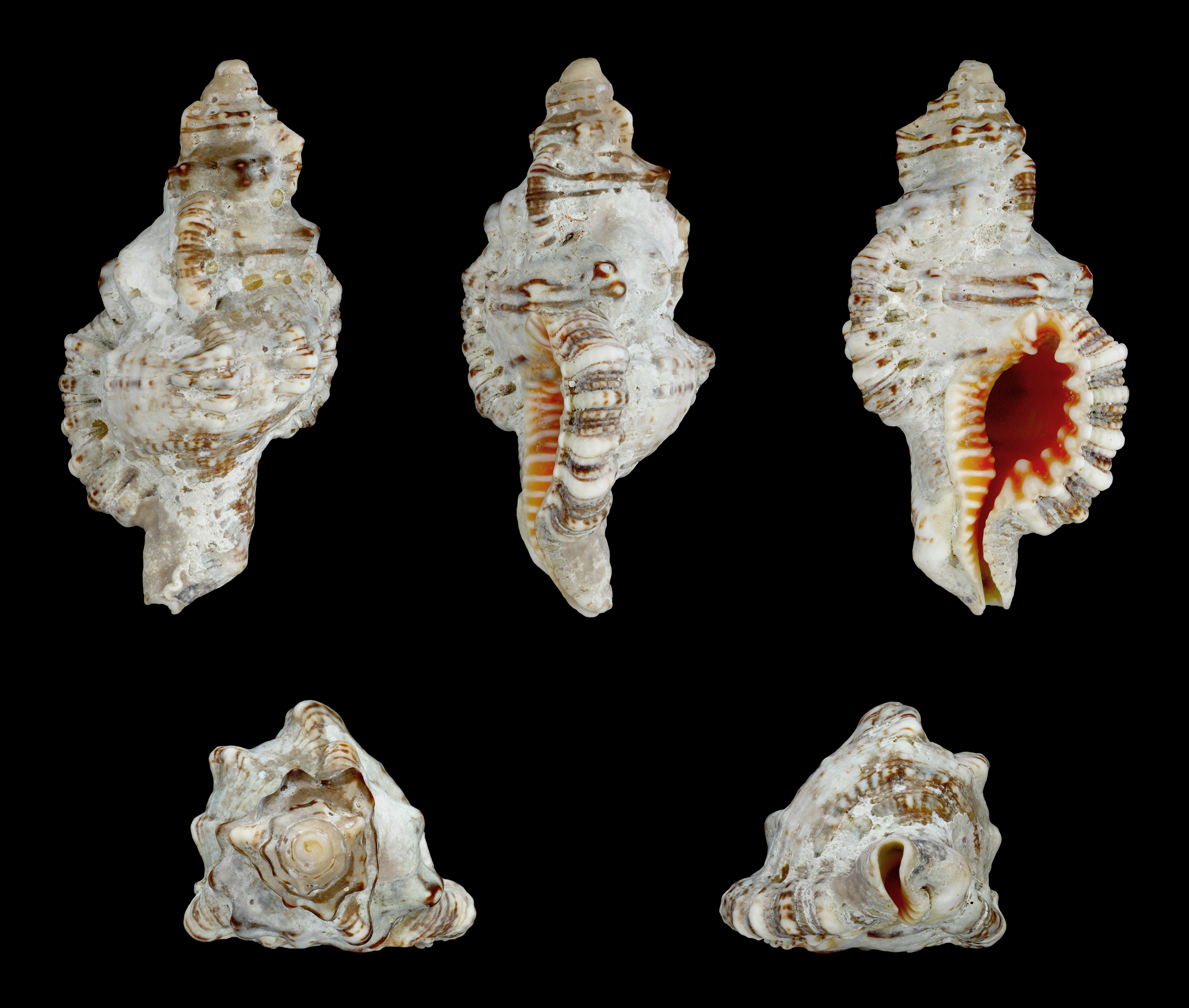
Monoplex nicobaricus (Ranellidae)

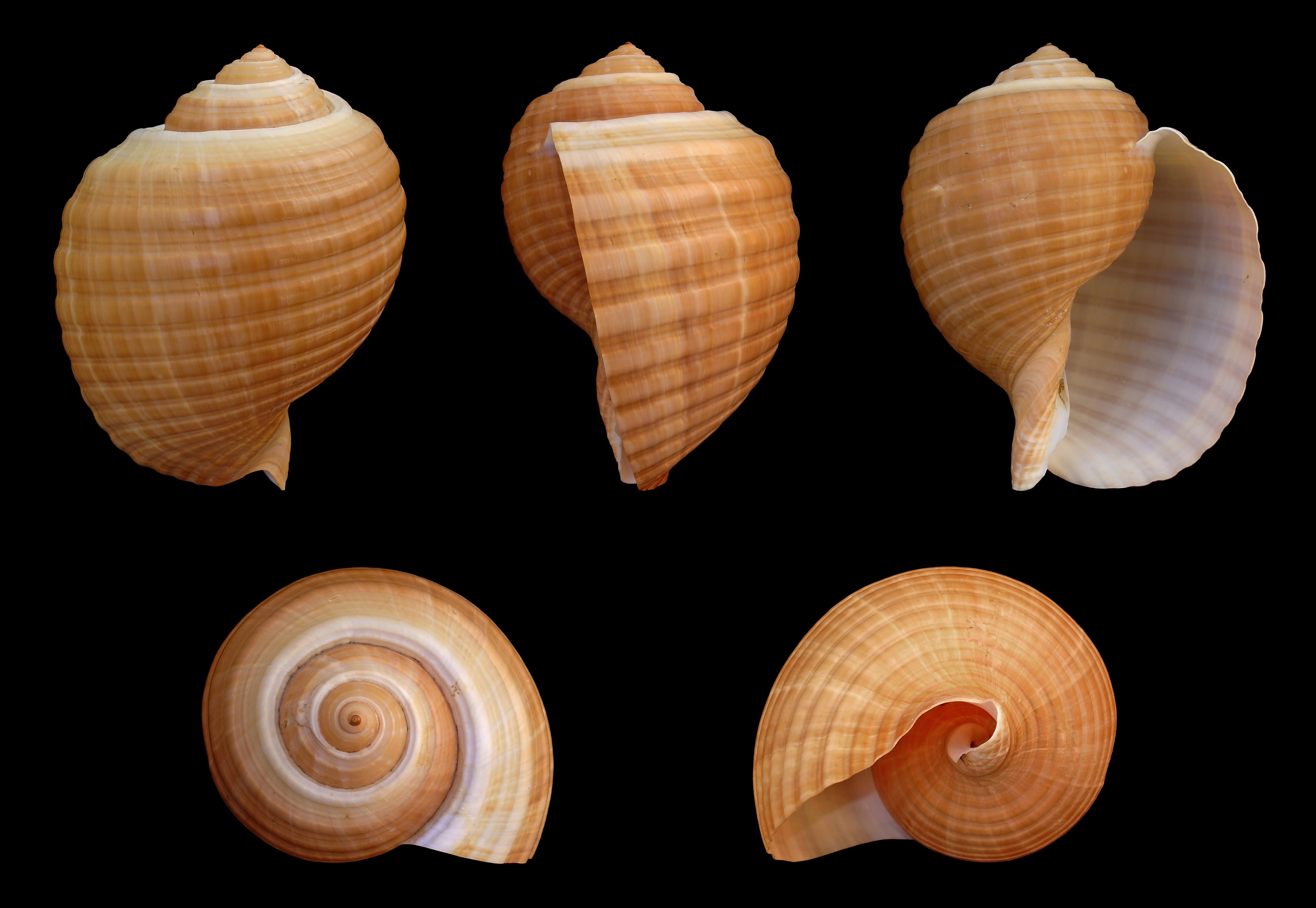
Tonna galea (Tonnidae)

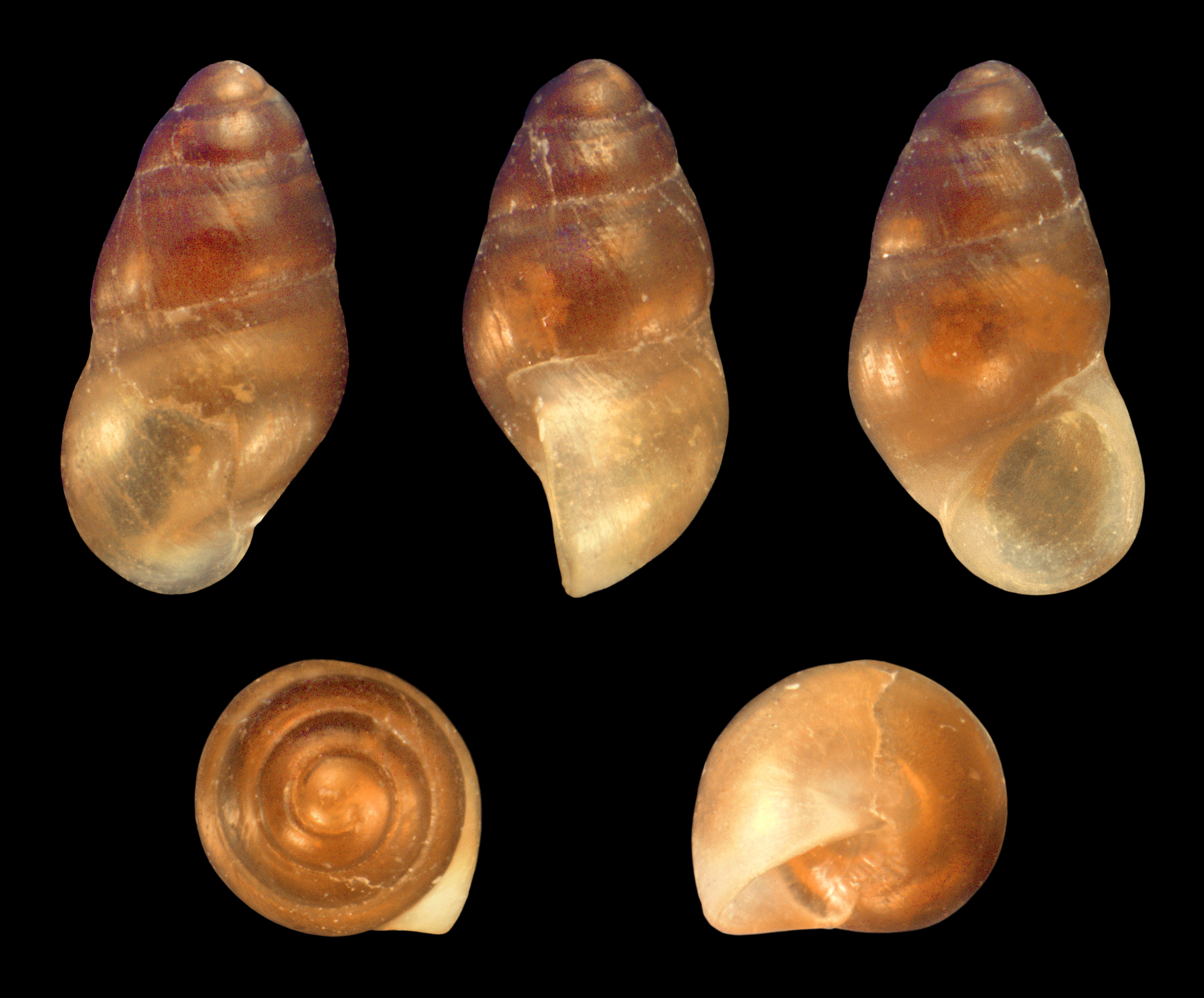
Pisinna glabrata (Anabathridae)

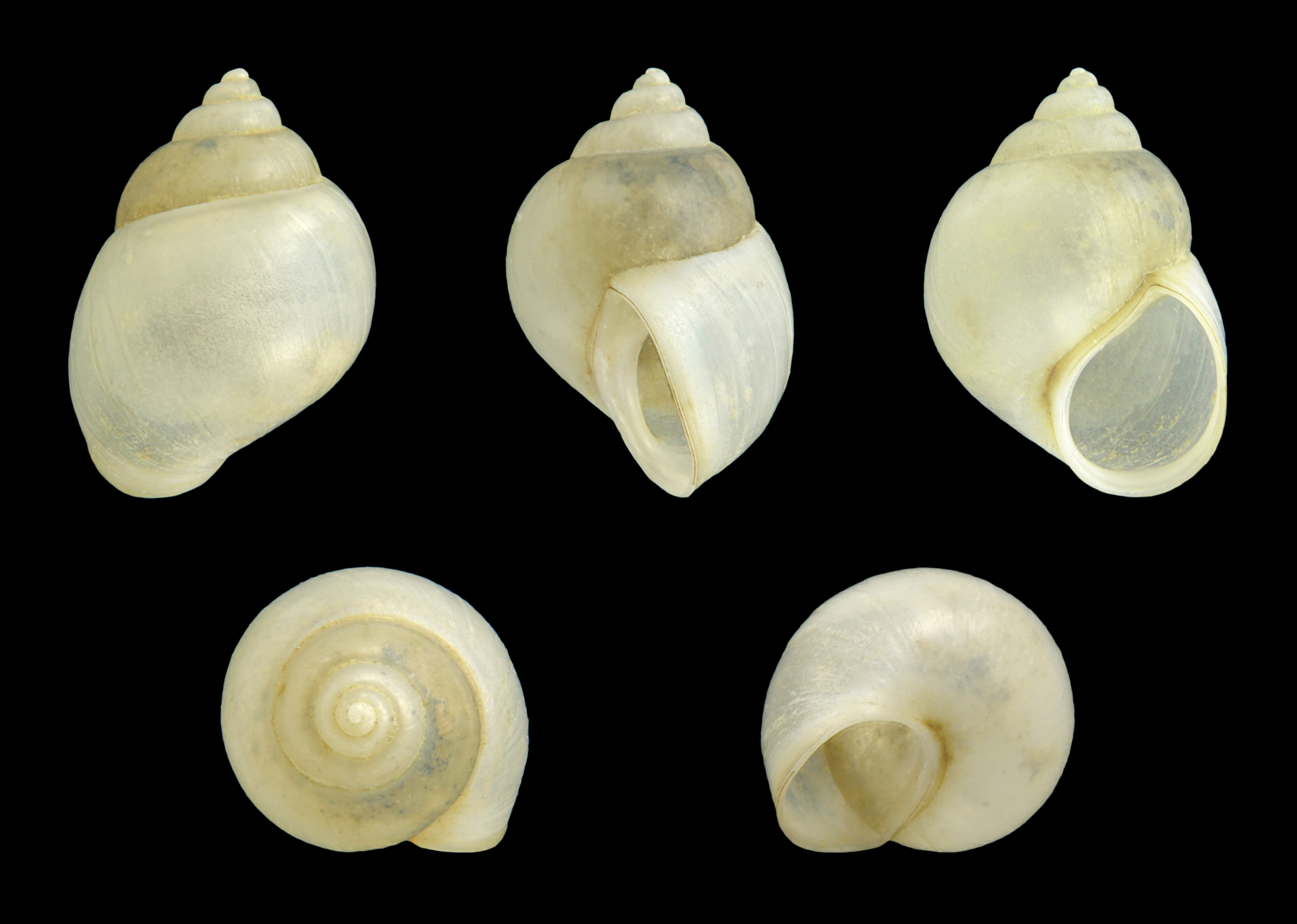
Bithynia tentaculata (Bithyniidae)

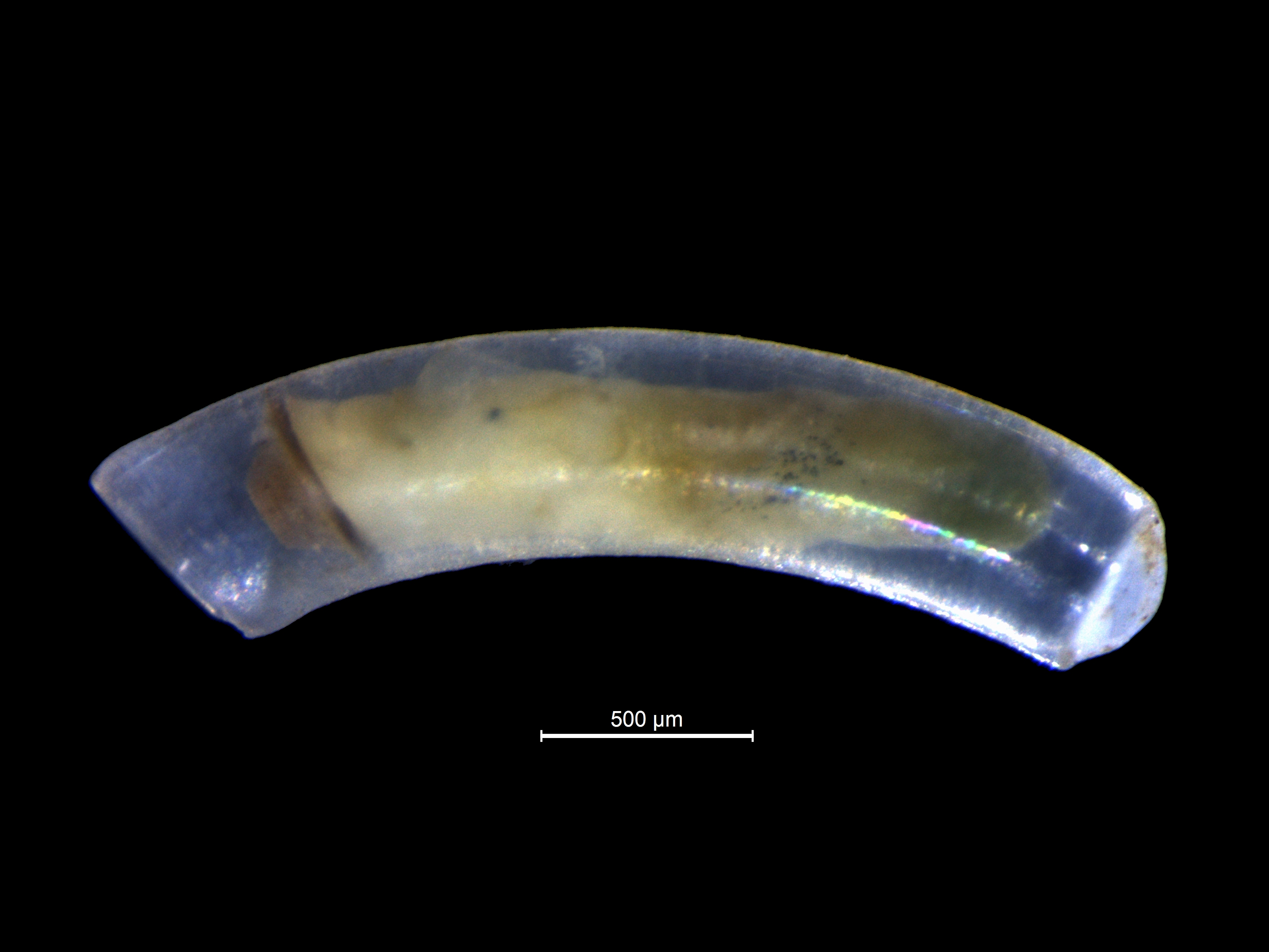
Caecum glabrum (Caecidae)

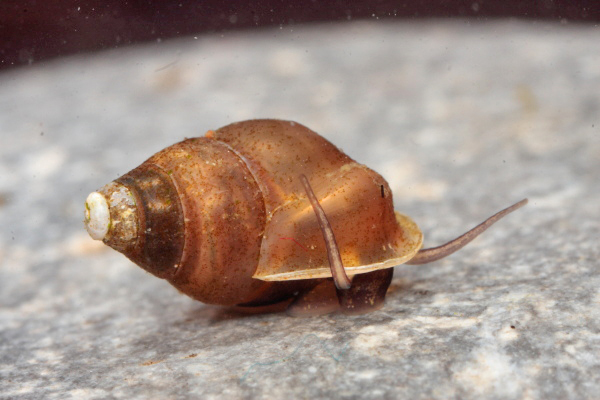
Emericia patula (Emmericiidae)

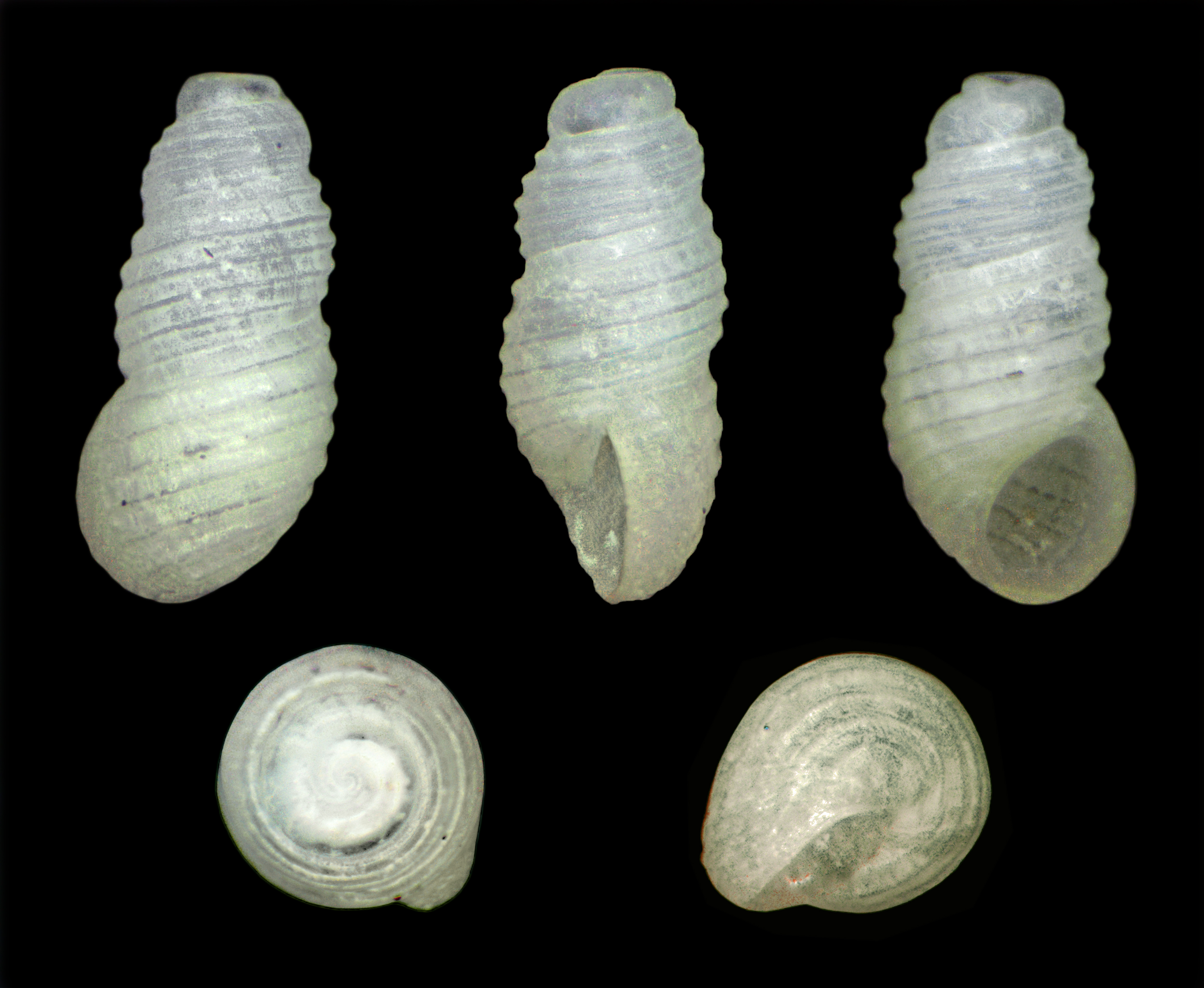
Liroceratia sulcata (Iravadiidae)

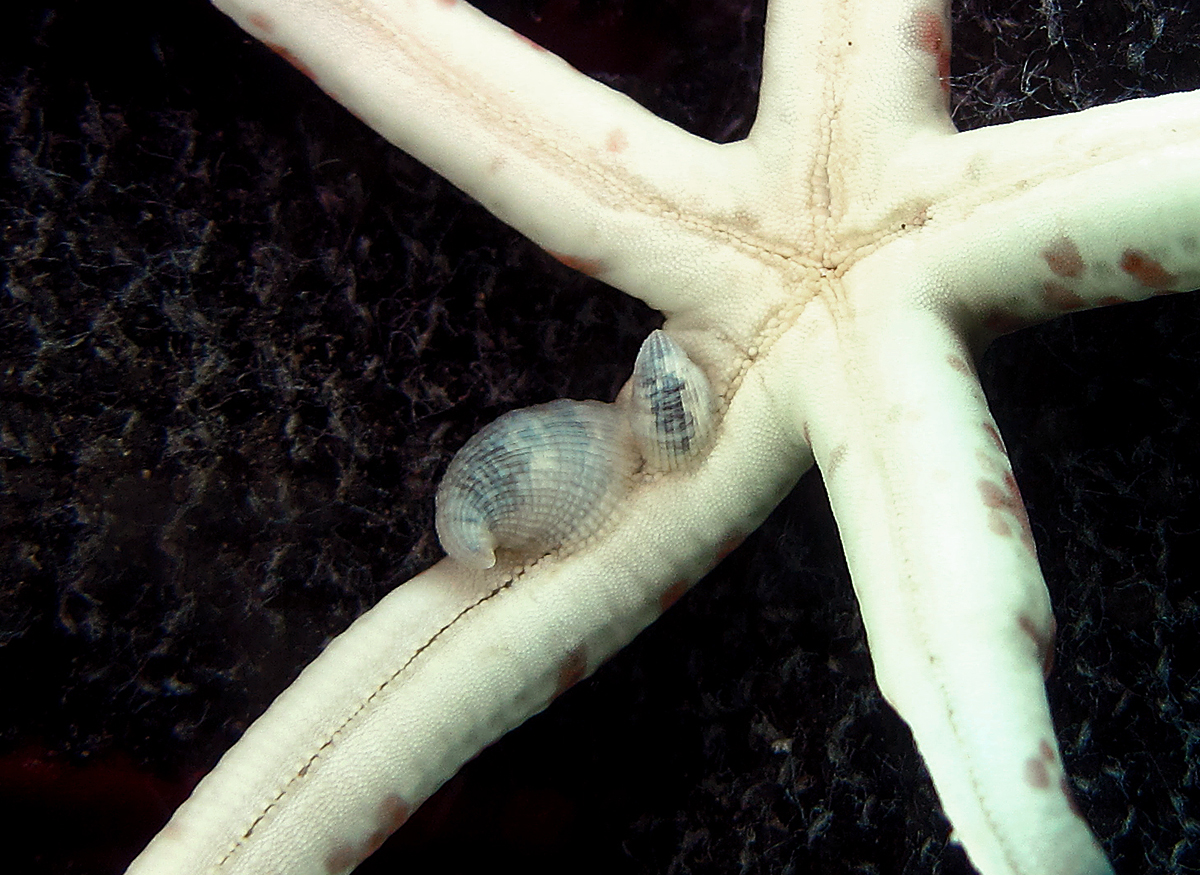
Thyca ectoconcha (Eulimidae) parasiting a sea star

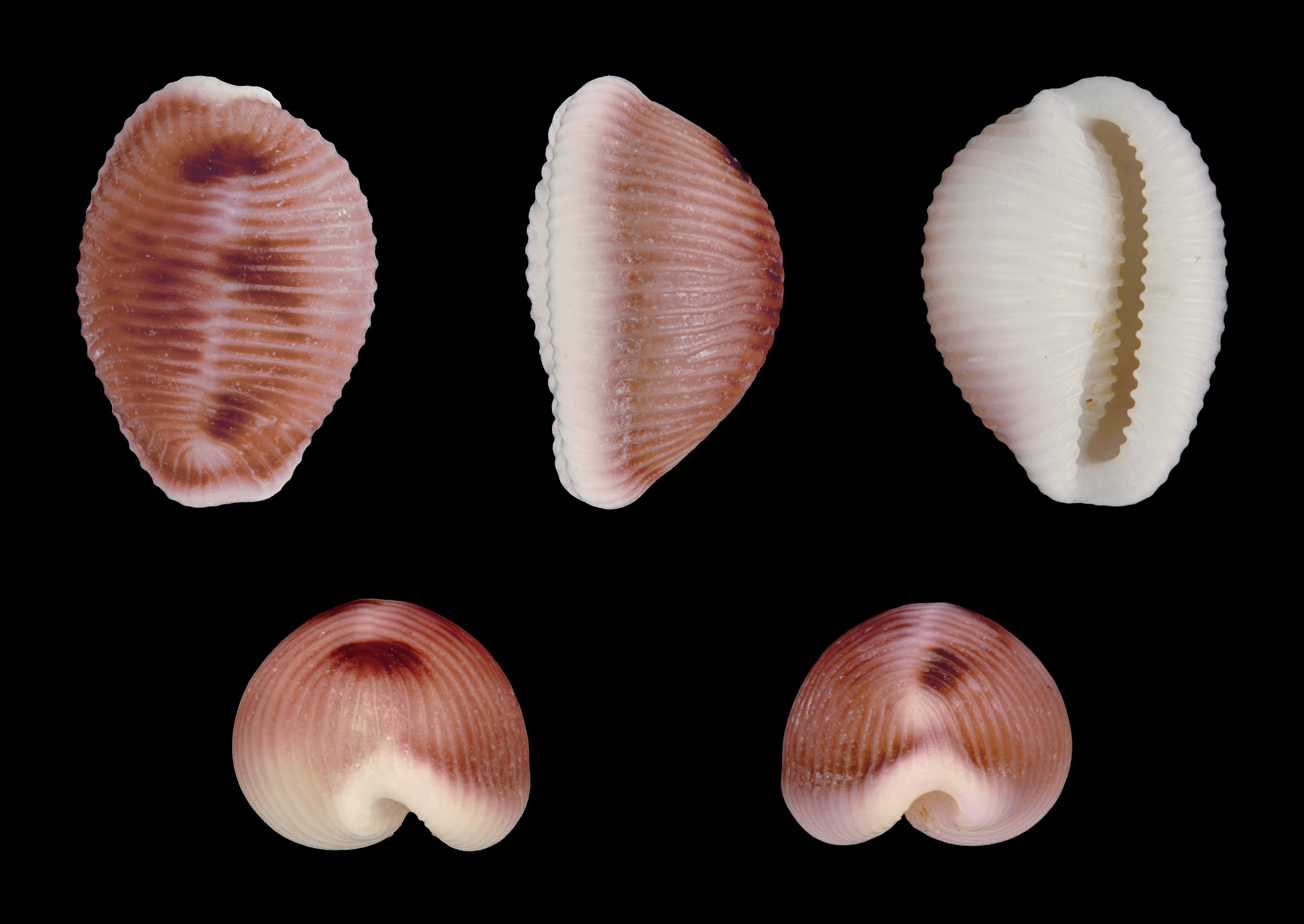
Trivia monacha (Triviidae)

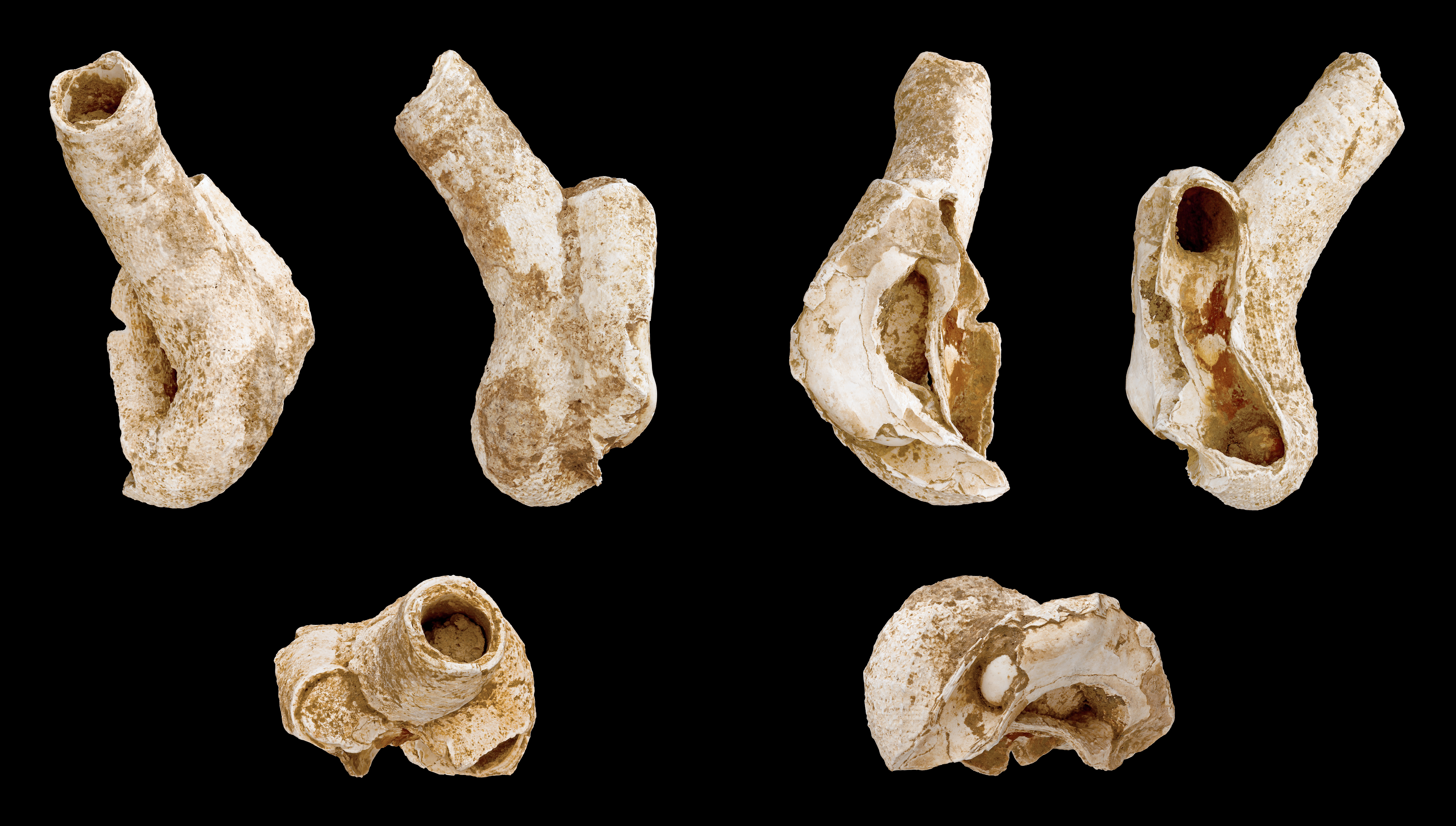
Thylacodes arenarius (Vermetidae)

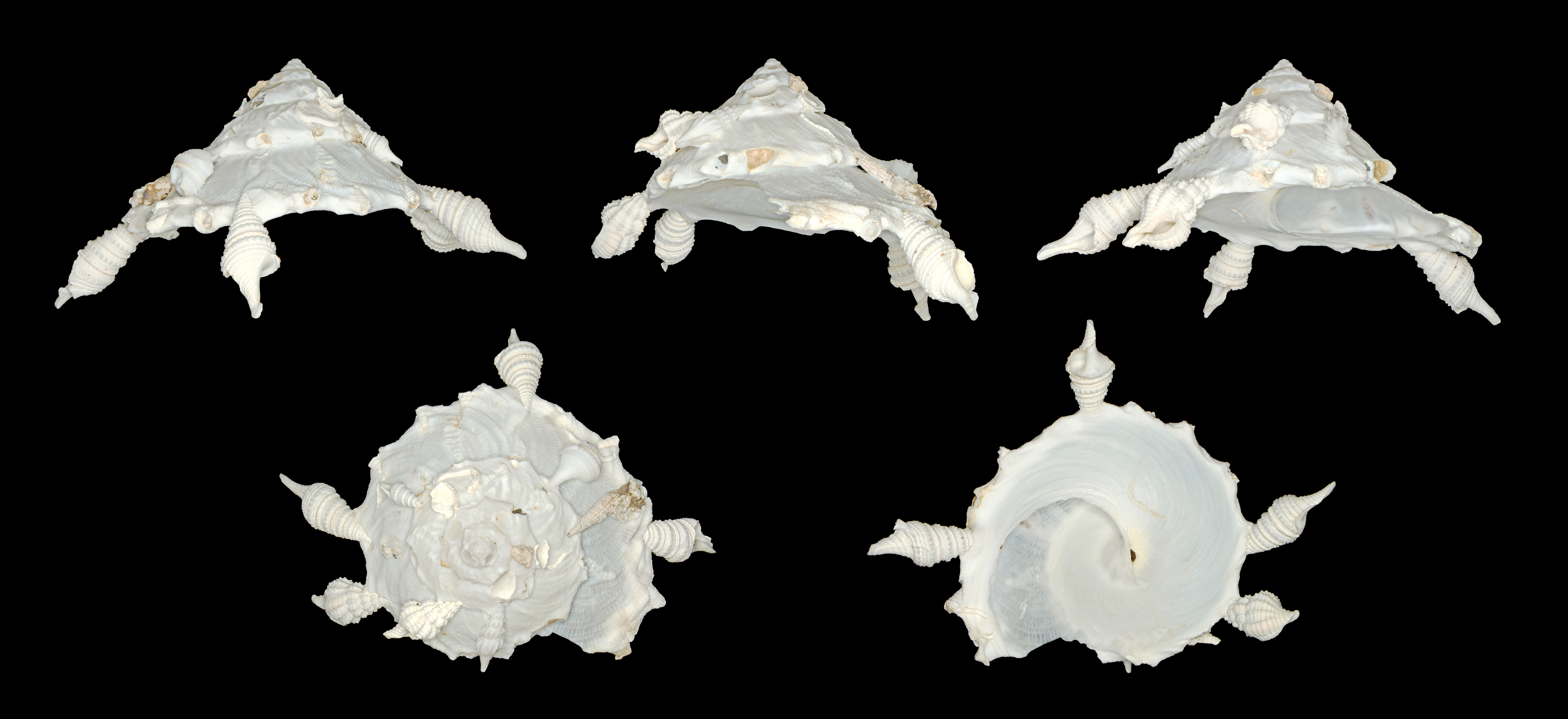
Xenophora pallidula (Xenophoridae)

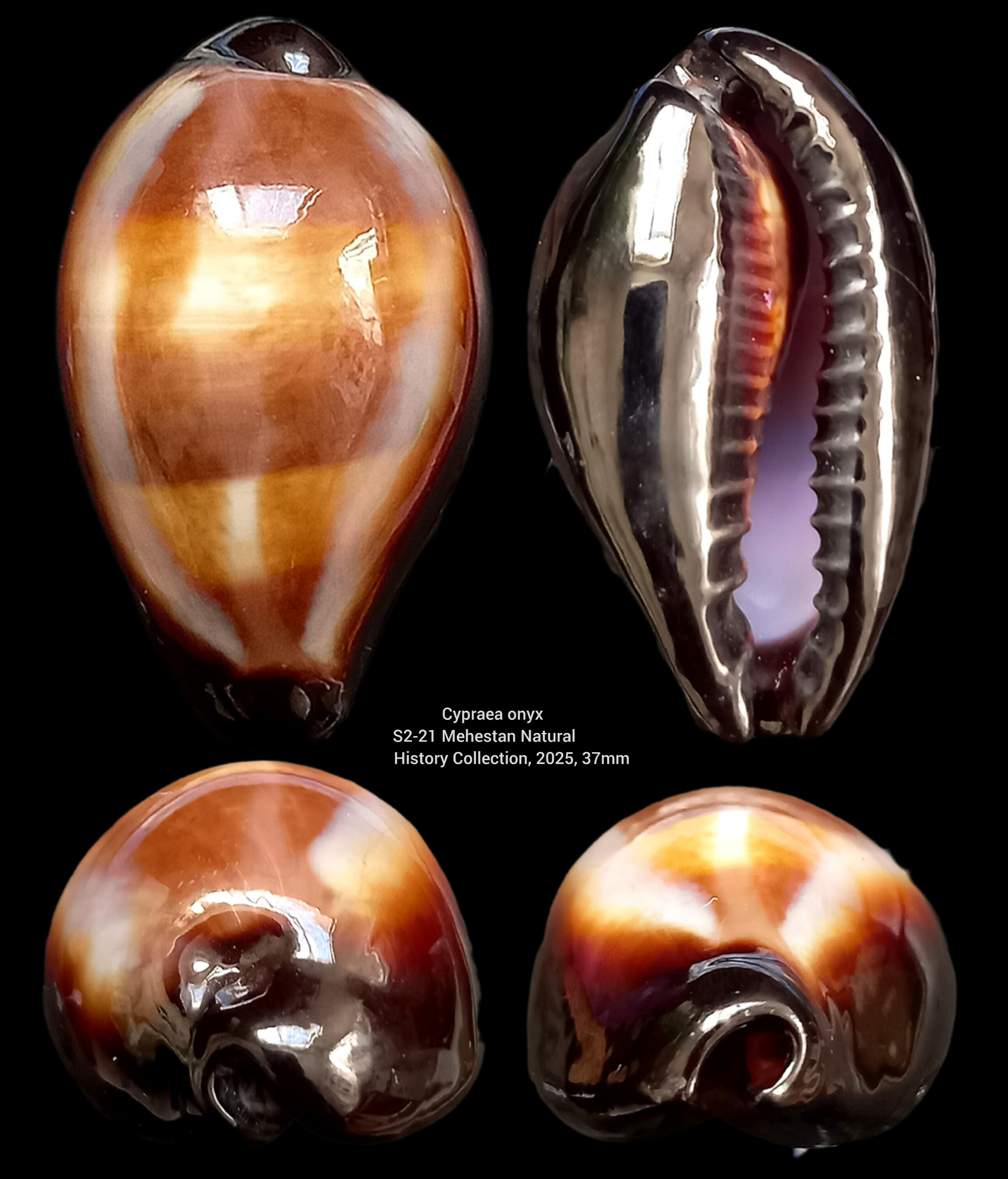
Erronea onyx (Cypraeidae)

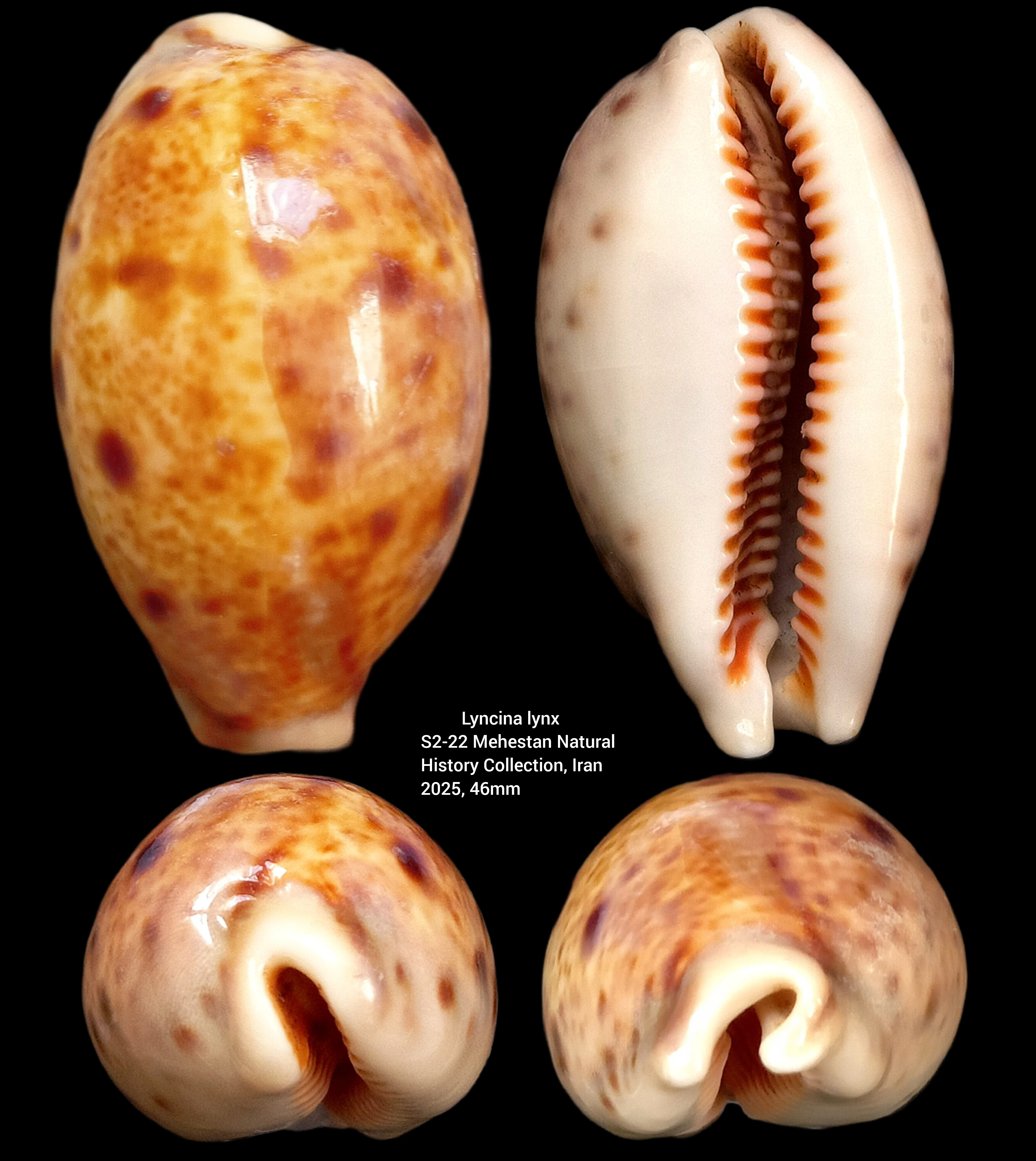
Lyncina lynx S2-22 46mm
