= Odostomia oyasiwo =

Odostomia oyasiwo Temporal range: Pleistocene–present

Scientific classification
- Kingdom: Animalia
- Phylum: Mollusca
- Class: Gastropoda
- Family: Pyramidellidae
- Genus: Odostomia
- Species: O. oyasiwo

Binomial name
- Odostomia oyasiwo Nomura, 1939

Synonyms
- Odostomia (Amaura) oyasiwo Nomura, 1939

Species of sea snail

Odostomia oyasiwo is a species of sea snail in the family Pyramidellidae. It was first formally described in 1939, and is known from Japan.

== Taxonomy ==
Shichihei Nomura described the species in 1939, placing it in the genus Odostomia, subgenus amaura and the section evalea. In 1991, Anders Warén discovered that amaura was already used by a genus of butterflies, making the subgenus a taxonomic homonym and requiring a rename. Warén chose the name Aartsenia as a replacement. In 2002, Shigeo Hori and colleagues redescribed the shell based on the original type specimens as well as newer ones and supported the species' placement in Odostomia.

== Description ==
The shell can be an opaque white or a semitransparent gray white. On average, it is 3.94 millimeters long and 1.59 millimeters wide. On the whorls of the teleoconch are very small spiral grooves, increasing in number the closer the whorl is to the base. At the base, these grooves become faint.

Odostomia desimana looks most similar to O. oyasiwo, but its shell is always opaque and is significantly thicker. O. desimana is additionally separated by the whorls on its teleoconch, which are shorter, thicker, and have no grooves.

== Ecology ==
The newer specimens of Odostomia oyasiwo that Hori and colleagues examined were collected from the shell of a living Fusinus perplexus, another sea snail. They were found on the suture and are the first species of its family to be found on the genus Fusinus. Several pyramidellids are known to parasitize other animals, but they may also be "foraging animals" and attach to non-hosts. It is unknown if O. oyasiwo parasitizes F. perplexus, as feeding has not been observed.

== Distribution ==
The species has been found in Miyako Bay of Iwate Prefecture, Innari of Ichihara City (from the Pleistocene epoch), and near Nada of Gobo city, Wakayama Prefecture. It can occur at depths of 40 to 95 meters.
