= Stylopsis =

Scientific classification
- Kingdom: Animalia
- Phylum: Mollusca
- Class: Gastropoda
- Family: Pyramidellidae
- Subfamily: Syrnolinae
- Tribe: Syrnolini
- Genus: Stylopsis; A. Adams, 1860

Type species
- Eulimella (Stylopsis) typica A. Adams, 1860

Genus of gastropods

Stylopsis is a genus of sea snails. In other words, they are a genus of marine gastropod, gastropods being a class of mollusk. This creature is within a particular family of sea snail called Pyramidellidae.

== Description ==
The shell is subulate, opaque, smooth, and not polished. The whorls of the teleoconch are flattened. The suture is well-impressed. The aperture is subquadrangular. The columella is straight and simple. The lip is subangular in front.

== Species ==
Species within the genus Stylopsis include:

- Stylopsis pulchellus de Folin, 1870
- Stylopsis sulcata A. Adams, 1861
- Stylopsis typica A. Adams, 1860

Taxa inquirenda

- Stylopsis marioni Locard, 1897
- Stylopsis polyskista de Folin, 1879
- Stylopsis textus de Folin, 1879

The following species were brought into synonymy

- Stylopsis eminuta de Folin, 1878 : synonym of Pyrgiscus eminutus (de Folin, 1878)
- Stylopsis rufofasciata E.A. Smith, 1875: synonym of Derjuginella rufofasciata (E.A. Smith, 1875)
- Stylopsis resticula (Dall, 1889): synonym of Bacteridium resticulum (Dall, 1889)
