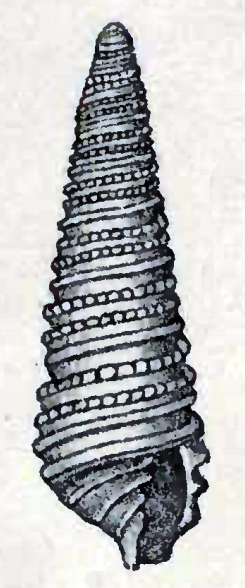
- Drawing of a shell of Triptychus niveus

Scientific classification
- Kingdom: Animalia
- Phylum: Mollusca
- Class: Gastropoda
- Subcohort: Panpulmonata
- Superfamily: Pyramidelloidea
- Family: Pyramidellidae
- Genus: Triptychus; Mörch, 1875

Type species
- Triptychus nivea Mörch, 1875

Synonyms
- Pyramidella (Triptychus) Mörch, 1875

= Triptychus =

Genus of gastropods

Triptychus is a genus of sea snails, marine gastropod mollusks in the family Pyramidellidae, the pyrams and their allies.

== Description ==
The subulate shell is spirally paucilirate. The aperture is lirate within, subsinuated in front. The columella is triplicate.

== Species ==
Species within the genus Triptychus include:

- Triptychus incantatus (Hertlein & A. M. Strong, 1939)
- Triptychus litosbathron Pimenta, Santos & Absalao, 2008
- Triptychus niveus (Mørch, 1875)
- Triptychus pacificus Corgan, 1973

Synonyms

- Triptychus olssoni (Bartsch, 1926): synonym of Triptychus incantatus (Hertlein & A. M. Strong, 1939)
- † Triptychus pliocena Bartsch, 1955: synonym of Peristichia pliocena (Bartsch, 1955) (original combination)
