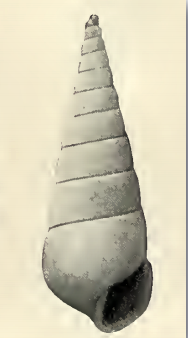
- Orinella (Bartsch, 1915)

Scientific classification
- Kingdom: Animalia
- Phylum: Mollusca
- Class: Gastropoda
- Family: Pyramidellidae
- Subfamily: Syrnolinae
- Tribe: Syrnolini
- Genus: Orinella; Dall & Bartsch, 1904

= Orinella =

Genus of gastropods

Orinella is a genus of sea snails, marine gastropod mollusks in the family Pyramidellidae, the pyrams and their allies.

== Species ==
Species within the genus Orinella include:

- Orinella africana (Bartsch, 1915)
- Orinella alfredensis (Bartsch, 1915)
- Orinella ebarana (Yokoyama, 1927)
- Orinella pulchella (A. Adams, 1854)

The following species were brought into synonymy:

- Orinella vanhyningi Bartsch, 1944 accepted as Syrnola vanhyningi (Bartsch, 1944)
