= Cossmannica catinati =

Scientific classification
- Kingdom: Animalia
- Phylum: Mollusca
- Class: Gastropoda
- Family: Pyramidellidae
- Genus: Cossmannica
- Species: C. catinati

Binomial name
- Cossmannica catinati Saurin, 1959

Synonyms
- Pyramidella (Cossmannica) catinati (Saurin, 1959)

Species of gastropod

Cossmannica catinati is a species of sea snail, a marine gastropod mollusk in the family Pyramidellidae, the pyrams and their allies.

== Distribution ==
This species, along with many other species within this genus of gastropods, occurs throughout the Gulf of Thailand and off the coasts of Vietnam.
