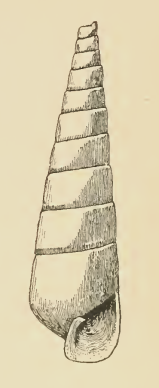
- Apertural view of a shell of Iphiana tenuisculpta

Scientific classification
- Kingdom: Animalia
- Phylum: Mollusca
- Class: Gastropoda
- Family: Pyramidellidae
- Genus: Iphiana
- Species: I. tenuisculpta

Binomial name
- Iphiana tenuisculpta (Lischke, 1872)

Synonyms
- Obeliscus tenuisculptus Lischke, 1872 (original combination); Pyramidella (Iphiana) tenuisculpta Lischke, 1872; Syrnola tenuisculpta (Lischke, 1872)

= Iphiana tenuisculpta =

Species of gastropod

Iphiana tenuisculpta is a species of sea snail, a marine gastropod mollusk in the family Pyramidellidae, the pyrams and their allies.

== Description ==
The shell grows to a length of 13 mm. The pale wax-yellow shell has an elongate-conic shape. The sides of the spire are rectilinear in outline. The whorls of the protoconch are decollated. The teleoconch contains 11 flattened whorls (the apex and perhaps two or three of the whorls of the teleoconch are lost). These whorls are increasing very regularly in size. They are slightly shouldered at the summit and separated by well-marked sutures. They are marked by faint lines of growth and numerous fine, closely spaced spiral striations. The periphery of the body whorl is somewhat angulated. The base of the shell is very short, well rounded and slightly excavated at the umbilical region, and sculptured like the space between sutures. The aperture is subquadrate. The posterior angle is acute. The outer lip is thin, without internal lirations. The columella is short, somewhat twisted and revolute. It bears a moderately strong oblique fold a little anterior to its insertion.

== Distribution ==
This species occurs in the Pacific Ocean off the Philippines and Japan.
