= Cossmannica bancoensis =

Scientific classification
- Kingdom: Animalia
- Phylum: Mollusca
- Class: Gastropoda
- Family: Pyramidellidae
- Genus: Cossmannica
- Species: C. bancoensis

Binomial name
- Cossmannica bancoensis Saurin, 1959

Synonyms
- Pyramidella (Cossmannica) bancoensis (Saurin, 1959)

Species of gastropod

Cossmannica bancoensis is a species of sea snail, a marine gastropod mollusk in the family Pyramidellidae, the pyrams and their allies.

== Distribution ==
This species occurs in the Gulf of Thailand and off the coasts of Vietnam.
