= Triptychus incantatus =

Scientific classification
- Kingdom: Animalia
- Phylum: Mollusca
- Class: Gastropoda
- Family: Pyramidellidae
- Genus: Triptychus
- Species: T. incantatus

Binomial name
- Triptychus incantatus (Bartsch, 1926)

Synonyms
- Pyramidella (Triptychus) olssoni Bartsch, 1926; Triptychus olssoni (Bartsch, 1926) ·

Species of gastropod

Triptychus incantatus is a species of sea snail, a marine gastropod mollusk in the family Pyramidellidae, the pyrams and their allies.
