= Tiberia navella =

Scientific classification
- Kingdom: Animalia
- Phylum: Mollusca
- Class: Gastropoda
- Family: Pyramidellidae
- Genus: Tiberia
- Species: T. navella

Binomial name
- Tiberia navella van Aartsen & Corgan, 1996

Synonyms
- Pyramidella umbilicata Thiele, 1925

Species of gastropod

Tiberia navella is a species of minute sea snail, a marine gastropod mollusk in the family Pyramidellidae, the pyrams and their allies.
