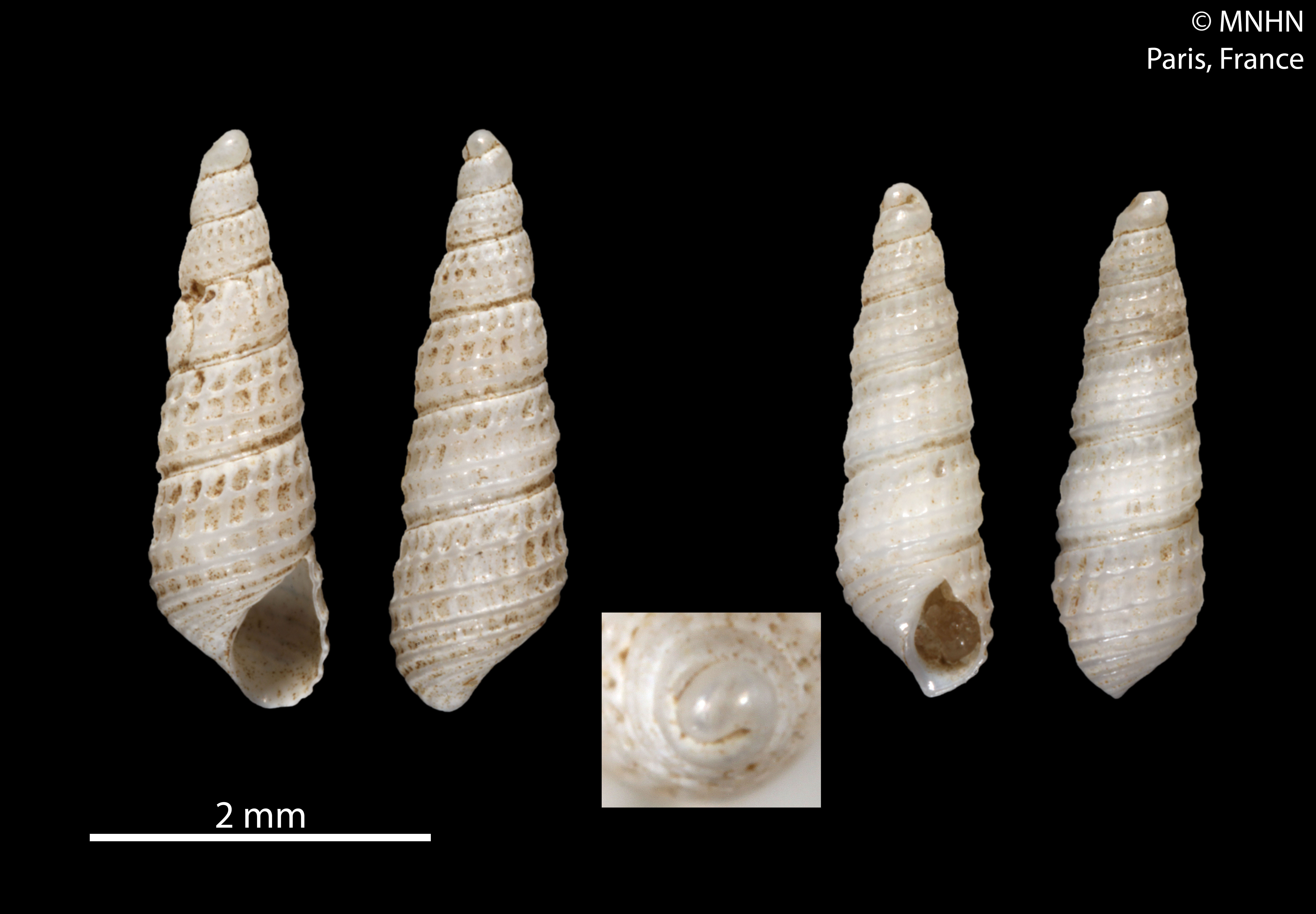
- Shell of Peristichia lepta (paratype at MNHN, Paris)

Scientific classification
- Kingdom: Animalia
- Phylum: Mollusca
- Class: Gastropoda
- Family: Pyramidellidae
- Genus: Peristichia
- Species: P. lepta

Binomial name
- Peristichia lepta Pimenta, Santos & Absalao, 2008

= Peristichia lepta =

Species of gastropod

Peristichia lepta is a species of sea snail, a marine gastropod mollusk in the family Pyramidellidae, the pyrams and their allies.

== Description ==
The shell grows to a length of 4.2 mm.

== Distribution ==
This species occurs in the Atlantic Ocean off Southeast Brazil.
