= Aartsenia candida =

Scientific classification
- Kingdom: Animalia
- Phylum: Mollusca
- Class: Gastropoda
- Family: Pyramidellidae
- Genus: Aartsenia
- Species: A. candida

Binomial name
- Aartsenia candida (Møller, 1842)

Synonyms
- Amaura candida Møller, 1842

Species of gastropod

Aartsenia candida is a species of sea snail, a marine gastropod mollusk in the family Pyramidellidae, the pyrams and their allies. The species is one of the two species within the Aartsenia genus, with the exception of the other related species being Aartsenia arctica.

== Distribution ==
This species occurs in the following locations:

- European waters (ERMS scope)
- North West Atlantic

== Notes ==
Additional information regarding this species:

- Distribution: southern Gaspe waters (Baie des Chaleurs, Gaspe Bay to American, Orphan and Bradelle banks; eastern boundary: eastern Bradelle Valley)
- Habitat: circalittoral of the Gulf and estuary
