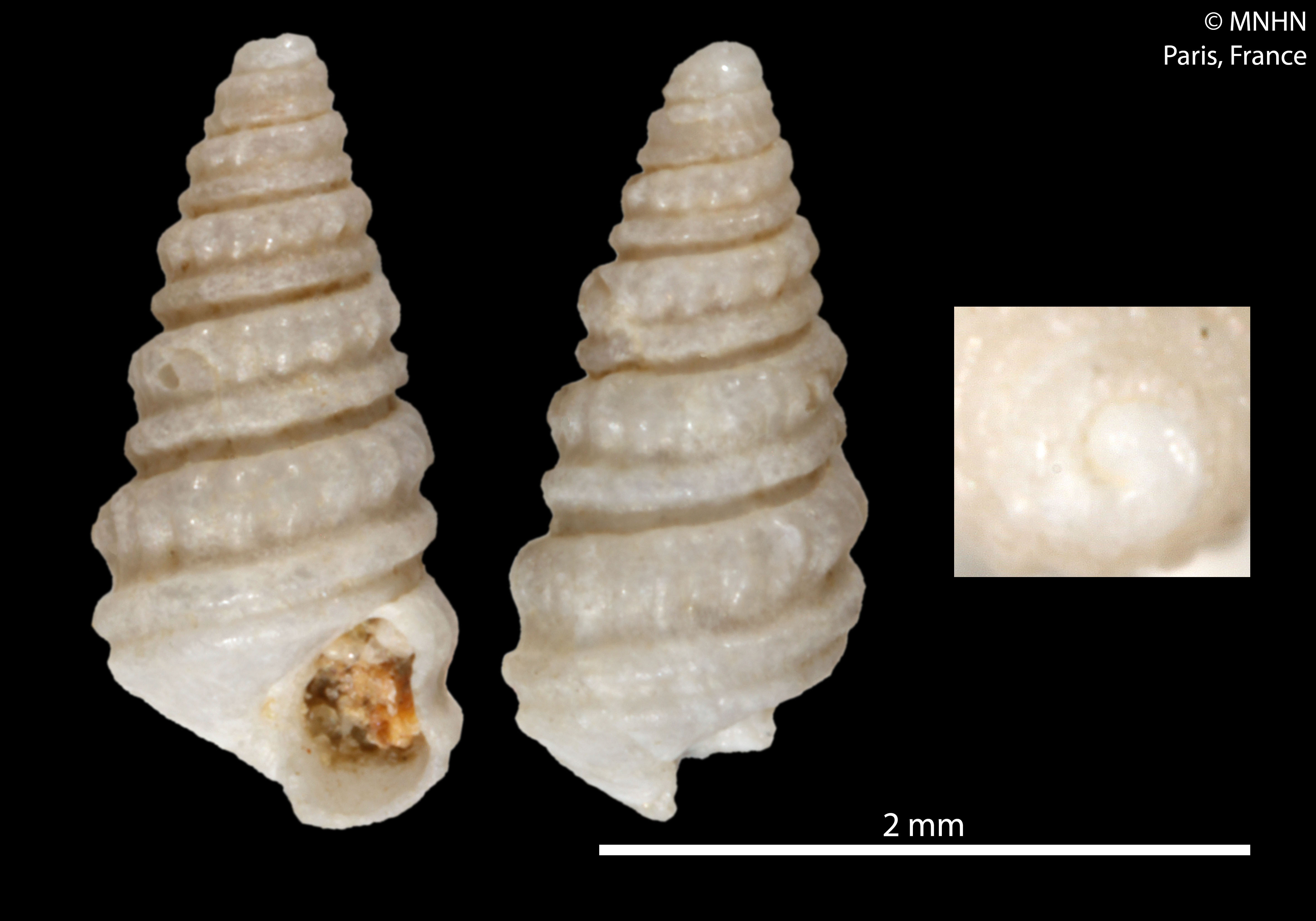
- Shell of Triptychus litosbathron (paratype at MNHN), Paris

Scientific classification
- Kingdom: Animalia
- Phylum: Mollusca
- Class: Gastropoda
- Family: Pyramidellidae
- Genus: Triptychus
- Species: T. litosbathron

Binomial name
- Triptychus litosbathron Pimenta, Santos & Absalao, 2008

= Triptychus litosbathron =

Species of gastropod

Triptychus litosbathron is a species of sea snail, a marine gastropod mollusk in the family Pyramidellidae, the pyrams and their allies.

== Description ==
The shell grows to a length of 2.4 mm.

== Distribution ==
This species occurs in the Atlantic Ocean off Brazil at depths between 45 mm and 175 m.
