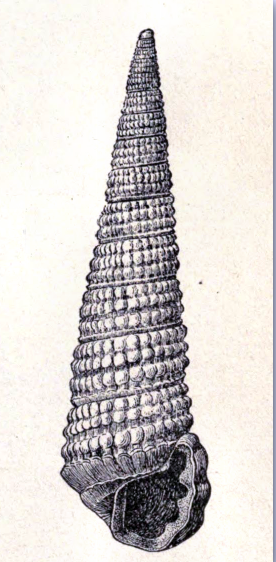
- Drawing of a shell of Peristichia toreta

Scientific classification
- Kingdom: Animalia
- Phylum: Mollusca
- Class: Gastropoda
- Family: Pyramidellidae
- Genus: Peristichia
- Species: P. toreta

Binomial name
- Peristichia toreta Dall, 1889

= Peristichia toreta =

Tower pyram

Species of gastropod

Peristichia toreta, common name the tower pyram, is a species of small sea snail, a marine gastropod mollusc in the family Pyramidellidae, the pyrams and their allies.

== Description ==
The length of an adult shell can be as much as 13.5 mm. The shell has two basal keels. The axial sculpture consists of strong ribs, and the spiral sculpture consists of strong ridges.

== Distribution ==
This species occurs in the following locations:

- Gulf of Mexico
- Atlantic Ocean off North Carolina
