= Orinella ebarana =

Scientific classification
- Kingdom: Animalia
- Phylum: Mollusca
- Class: Gastropoda
- Family: Pyramidellidae
- Genus: Orinella
- Species: O. ebarana

Binomial name
- Orinella ebarana (Yokoyama, 1927)

Species of gastropod

Orinella ebarana is a species of sea snail, a marine gastropod mollusk in the family Pyramidellidae, the pyrams and their allies.
