= Cossmannica subcarina =

Scientific classification
- Kingdom: Animalia
- Phylum: Mollusca
- Class: Gastropoda
- Family: Pyramidellidae
- Genus: Cossmannica
- Species: C. subcarina

Binomial name
- Cossmannica subcarina Laseron, 1959

Synonyms
- Pyramidella (Cossmannica) subcarina (Laseron, 1959)

Species of gastropod

Cossmannica subcarina is a species of sea snail, a marine gastropod mollusk in the family Pyramidellidae, the pyrams and their allies.

== Distribution ==
This marine species occurs off the coasts of Queensland, Australia, within the Great Barrier Reef and throughout various marine areas nearby.
