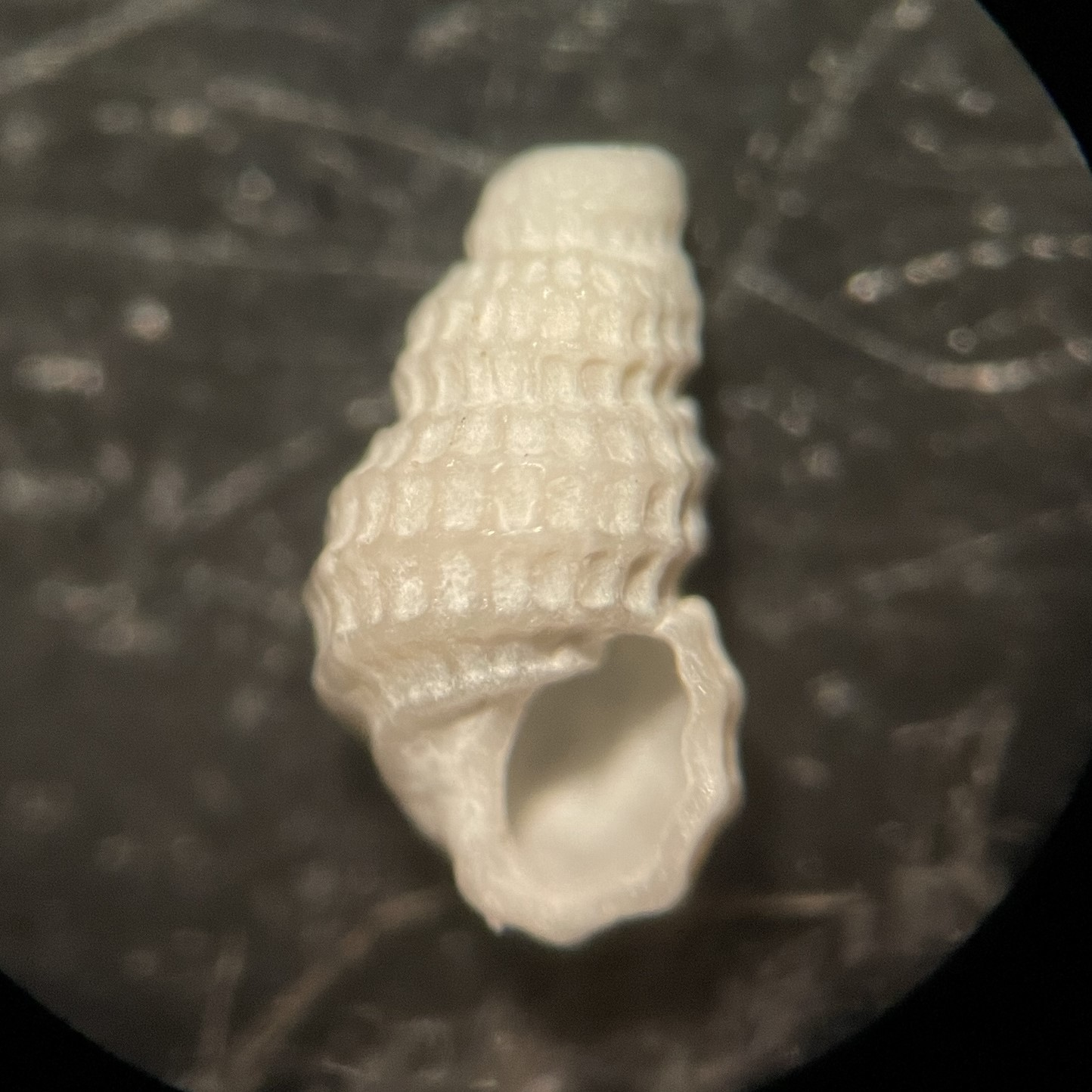

Scientific classification
- Kingdom: Animalia
- Phylum: Mollusca
- Class: Gastropoda
- Family: Pyramidellidae
- Genus: Peristichia
- Species: P. agria

Binomial name
- Peristichia agria Dall, 1889

= Peristichia agria =

Species of gastropod

Peristichia agria is a species of sea snail, a marine gastropod mollusk in the family Pyramidellidae, the pyrams and their allies.

== Description ==
The shell grows to a length of 6 mm.

== Distribution ==
This marine species occurs in the following locations:

- Caribbean Sea
- Colombia
- Gulf of Mexico
- Puerto Rico
- Atlantic Ocean : from North Carolina to central Brazil.
