= Cossmannica exesa =

Scientific classification
- Kingdom: Animalia
- Phylum: Mollusca
- Class: Gastropoda
- Family: Pyramidellidae
- Genus: Cossmannica
- Species: C. exesa

Binomial name
- Cossmannica exesa Laseron, 1959

Synonyms
- Pyramidella (Cossmannica) exesa (Laseron, 1959)

Species of gastropod

Cossmannica exesa is a species of sea snail, a marine gastropod mollusk in the family Pyramidellidae, the pyrams and their allies.

== Distribution ==
This marine species occurs off the coasts of Queensland, Australia, within the Great Barrier Reef and other various marine areas nearby.
