= Ptycheulimella =

Scientific classification
- Kingdom: Animalia
- Phylum: Mollusca
- Class: Gastropoda
- Family: Pyramidellidae
- Subfamily: Syrnolinae
- Tribe: Syrnolini
- Genus: Ptycheulimella; Sacco, 1892

Type species
- Tornatella pyramidata Deshayes.

Synonyms
- Turbonilla (Ptycheulimella) Sacco, 1892

Genus of gastropods

Ptycheulimella is a genus of sea snails, marine gastropod mollusks in the family Pyramidellidae, the pyrams and their allies.

== Description ==
The shell has an elongate-conic shape. The axial sculpture consists of obsolete ribs, frequently only shown in the early turns of the teleoconch. Spiral sculpture, if present, consists of microscopic striations only.

== Species ==
Species within the genus Ptycheulimella include:

- Ptycheulimella eulimelloides (Nomura, 1936)
- Ptycheulimella hemiplicata (Nomura, 1936)
- Ptycheulimella misella (Yokoyama, 1922)
- Ptycheulimella rikuzenica (Nomura, 1936)
- Ptycheulimella supramisella (Nomura, 1938)
- Ptycheulimella syrnoliformis (Nomura, 1938)
- Ptycheulimella yabei Nomura 1939
