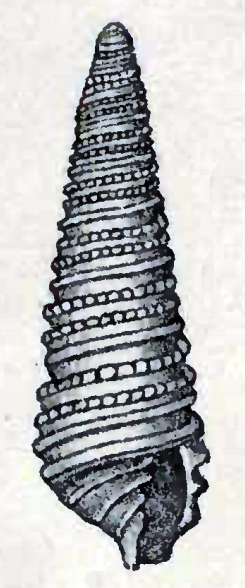
- Drawing of a shell of Triptychus niveus

Scientific classification
- Kingdom: Animalia
- Phylum: Mollusca
- Class: Gastropoda
- Family: Pyramidellidae
- Genus: Triptychus
- Species: T. niveus

Binomial name
- Triptychus niveus (Mørch, 1875)

Synonyms
- Obeliscus niveus Mörch, 1875; Oscilla biseriata auct. non Gabb, 1881; Pyramidella (Triptychus) nivea (Mørch, 1875); Pyramidella niveus (Mörch, 1875); Pyramidella vincta Dall, 1884

= Triptychus niveus =

Species of gastropod

Triptychus niveus is a species of small sea snail, a marine gastropod mollusk in the family Pyramidellidae, the pyrams and their allies.

== Description ==
The shell grows to a length of 9.5 mm. The white shell is slender. The whorls of the teleoconch are flattened, each with three spiral ribs, the two upper ones nodulous. The body whorl has two plain ribs below the nodulous ones, and three revolving ridges below the periphery, forming columellar folds. The aperture is produced below.

== Distribution ==
This species occurs in the following locations:

- Aruba
- Belize
- Bonaire
- Caribbean Sea
- Cayman Islands
- Colombia
- Costa Rica
- Cuba
- Curaçao
- Gulf of Mexico
- Lesser Antilles
- Mexico
- Panama
- Puerto Rico
