= Peristichia bathyraphe =

Scientific classification
- Kingdom: Animalia
- Phylum: Mollusca
- Class: Gastropoda
- Family: Pyramidellidae
- Genus: Peristichia
- Species: P. bathyraphe

Binomial name
- Peristichia bathyraphe (Sowerby III, 1901)

Synonyms
- Turbonilla (Peristichia) bathyraphe Sowerby III, 1901

Species of gastropod

Peristichia bathyraphe is a species of sea snail, a marine gastropod mollusk in the family Pyramidellidae, the pyrams and their allies.

== Distribution ==
The type specimen of this marine species was found off Port Alfred, South Africa.
