= Cossmannica behainei =

Scientific classification
- Kingdom: Animalia
- Phylum: Mollusca
- Class: Gastropoda
- Family: Pyramidellidae
- Genus: Cossmannica
- Species: C. behainei

Binomial name
- Cossmannica behainei Saurin, 1959

Synonyms
- Pyramidella (Cossmannica) behainei (Saurin, 1959)

Species of gastropod

Cossmannica behainei is a species of sea snail, a marine gastropod mollusk in the family Pyramidellidae, the pyrams and their allies. The species is one of a number within the genus Cossmannica.

== Distribution ==
This marine species occurs off the coasts of Vietnam.
