= Agatha georgiana =

Scientific classification
- Kingdom: Animalia
- Phylum: Mollusca
- Class: Gastropoda
- Family: Pyramidellidae
- Genus: Agatha
- Species: A. georgiana

Binomial name
- Agatha georgiana (Hutton, 1885)

Species of gastropod

Agatha georgiana is a species of sea snail, a marine gastropod mollusk in the family Pyramidellidae, the pyrams and their allies. The species is one of the two species within the Agatha genus, with the exception of the other related species being Agatha virgo.

== Distribution ==
- Marine
