= Derjuginella =

Scientific classification
- Kingdom: Animalia
- Phylum: Mollusca
- Class: Gastropoda
- Family: Pyramidellidae
- Subfamily: Syrnolinae
- Tribe: Syrnolini
- Genus: Derjuginella; Habe, 1958

Type species
- Stylopsis rufofasciata E.A. Smith, 1875

Genus of gastropods

Derjuginella is a genus of sea snails, marine gastropod mollusks in the family Pyramidellidae, the pyrams and their allies.

== Species ==
There is only one known species to exist within this genus of gastropods, the only species within the genus Derjuginella is:

- Derjuginella rufofasciata (E.A. Smith, 1875)
