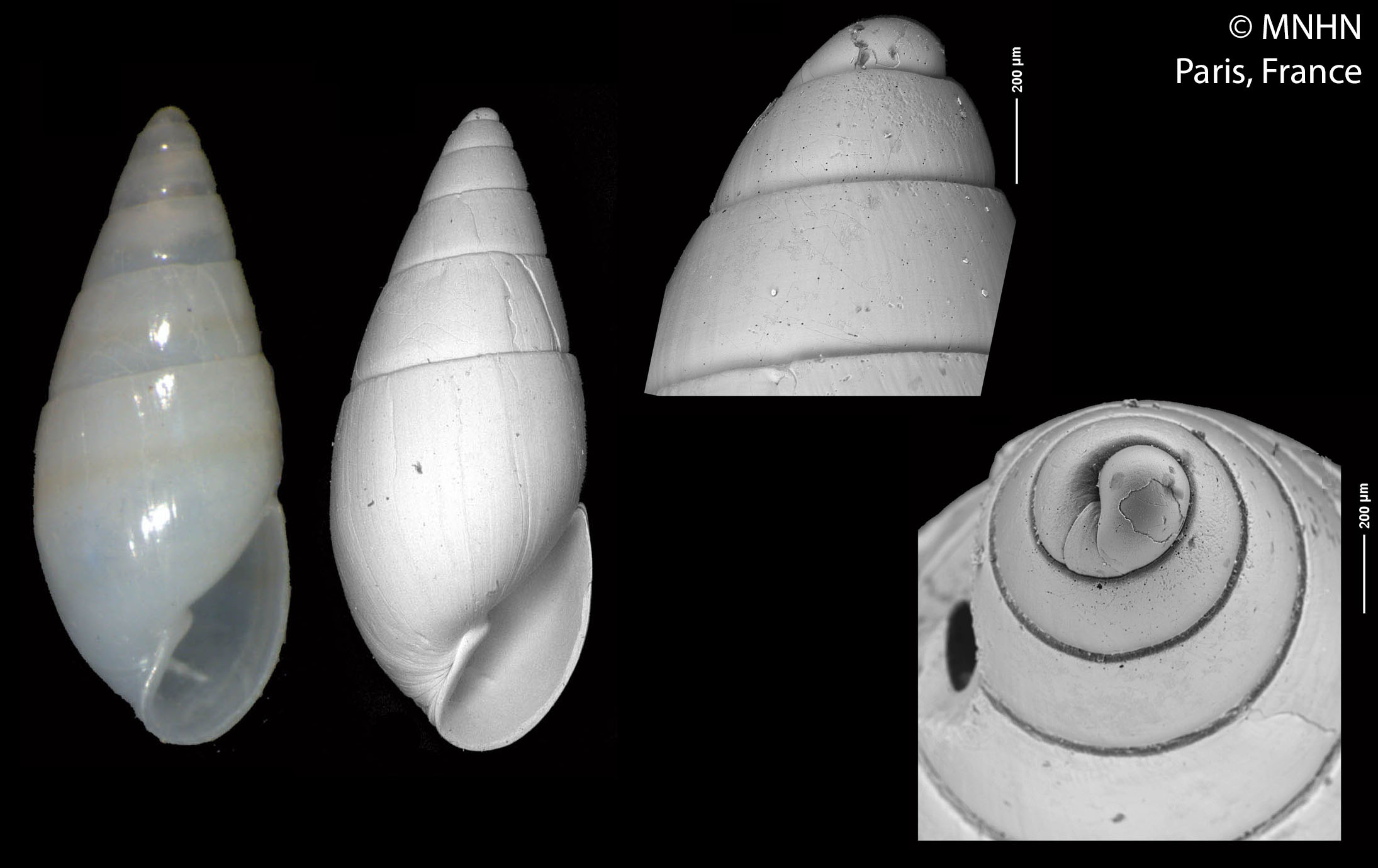
- Shell of Agatha obesa (holotype at MNHN, Paris)

Scientific classification
- Kingdom: Animalia
- Phylum: Mollusca
- Class: Gastropoda
- Family: Pyramidellidae
- Subfamily: Syrnolinae
- Tribe: Syrnolini
- Genus: Agatha; A. Adams, 1860

Type species
- Agatha virgo A. Adams, 1860

Species
- See text

Synonyms
- Amathis A. Adams, 1861 (objective synonym); Pyramidella (Agatha) A. Adams, 1860

= Agatha (gastropod) =

Genus of molluscs

Agatha is a small genus of minute sea snails or marine gastropod mollusks within the subfamily Syrnolinae, which is a part of the family Pyramidellidae.

They have bilateral symmetry and only have endoderm and ectoderm tissues.

The species of this genus are ectoparasites on other invertebrates.

== Distribution ==
- Marine

== Species ==
- † Agatha alexanderi (Marwick, 1929)
- Agatha amabilis Nomura, 1936
- Agatha australis (Angas, 1871)
- Agatha brevis Yokoyama, 1922
- Agatha filia (Melvill, 1893)
- Agatha georgiana (Hutton, 1885)
- Agatha laevis (Angas, 1867)
- Agatha obesa Peñas & Rolán, 2016
- † Agatha otaioensis Laws, 1940
- Agatha pacei (Dautzenberg & Fischer, 1906)
- † Agatha pittensis (Marwick, 1928)
- Agatha placida Nomura, 1936
- Agatha vestalis Melvill, 1910
- Agatha virgo Weisbord, 1962

Species brought into synonymy

- Agatha angasi (Tryon, 1886): synonym of Syrnola angasi (Tryon, 1886)
- Agatha infrequens Nomura, 1937: synonym of Odostomia infrequens (Nomura, 1937)
- Agatha lepidula Habe, 1961: synonym of Tibersyrnola lepidula (Habe, 1961)
- Agatha simplex (Angas, 1871): synonym of Megastomia simplex (Angas, 1871)
