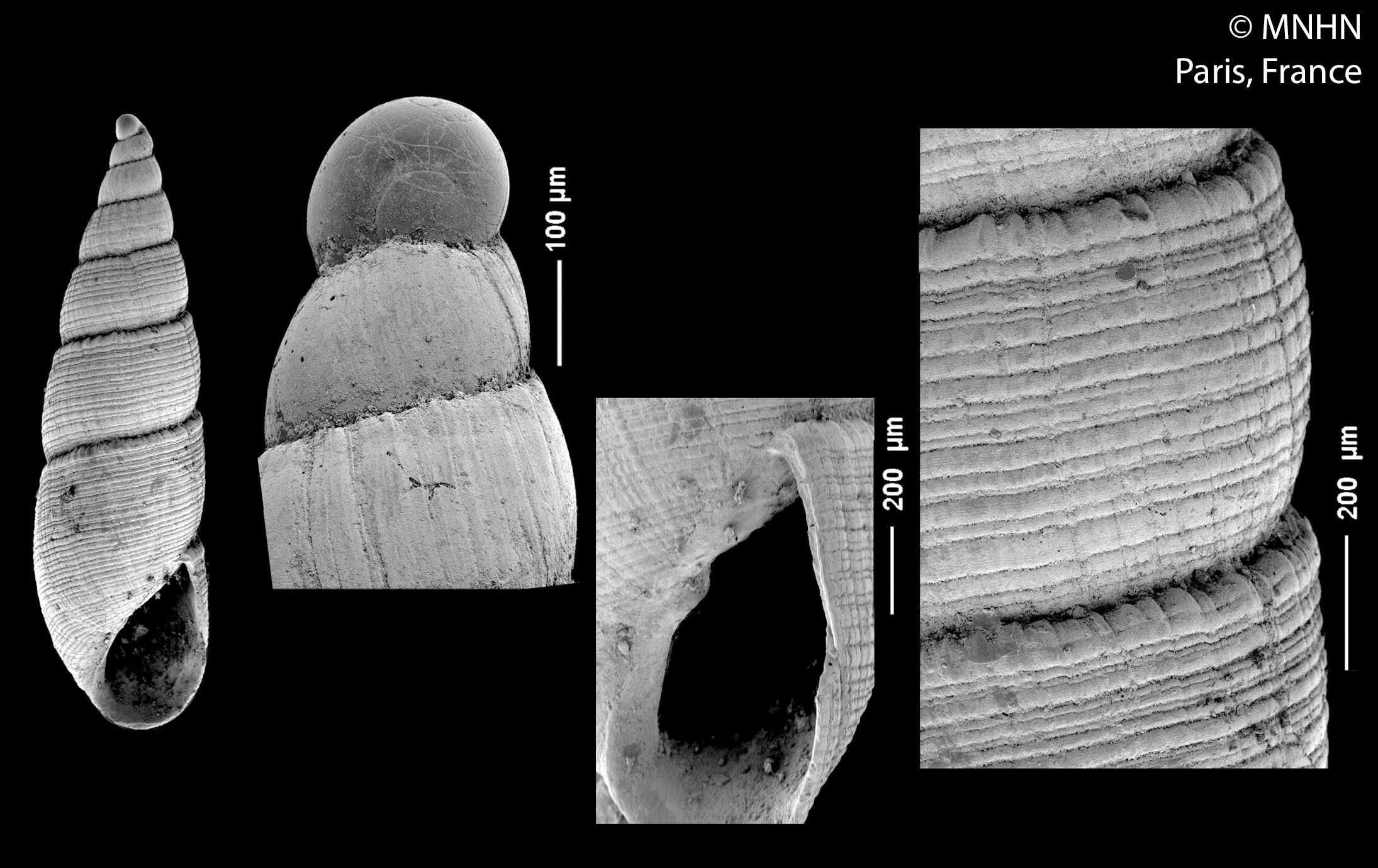
- Shell of Iphiana danieli (holotype at MNHN, Paris)

Scientific classification
- Kingdom: Animalia
- Phylum: Mollusca
- Class: Gastropoda
- Family: Pyramidellidae
- Subfamily: Syrnolinae
- Tribe: Syrnolini
- Genus: Iphiana; Dall & Bartsch, 1904

Type species
- Odostomia densestriata Garrett, 1873

= Iphiana =

Genus of gastropods

Iphiana is a genus of sea snails, marine gastropod mollusks in the subfamily Turbonillinae of the family Pyramidellidae, the pyrams and their allies.

== Characteristics ==
The shell is large, heavy, and elongated, and it lacks an umbilicus. Its surface is sculptured with both axial and spiral striations, including a particularly strong spiral element. The columella bears a single fold.

== Species ==
- Iphiana danieli Peñas & Rolán, 2016
- Iphiana densestriata (Garrett, 1873)
- Iphiana microperforata Peñas & Rolán, 2016
- Iphiana mira (Yokoyama, 1922)
- † Iphiana sisuiensis (Nomura, 1938)
- † Iphiana siva (Yokoyama, 1922) †
- Iphiana tenuisculpta (Lischke, 1872)
