= Costosyrnola =

Scientific classification
- Kingdom: Animalia
- Phylum: Mollusca
- Class: Gastropoda
- Family: Pyramidellidae
- Subfamily: Syrnolinae
- Tribe: Syrnolini
- Genus: Costosyrnola; Laws, 1937

Genus of gastropods

Costosyrnola is a genus of sea snails, marine gastropod mollusks in the family Pyramidellidae, the pyrams and their allies. This genus was formerly authorized by Laws in 1937.

== Species ==
Species within the genus Costosyrnola include:

- Costosyrnola nitidissima (Issel, 1869)
- Costosyrnola thailandica (Robba, Di Geronimo, Chaimanee, Negri & Sanfilippo, 2004)
