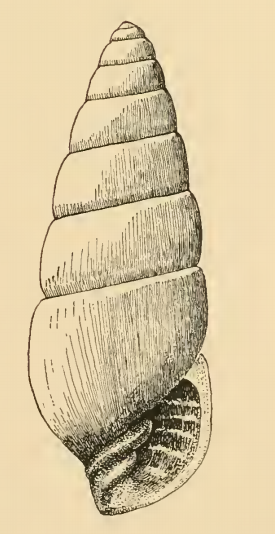
- Apertural view of a shell of Cossmannica jacksonensis

Scientific classification
- Kingdom: Animalia
- Phylum: Mollusca
- Class: Gastropoda
- Family: Pyramidellidae
- Genus: Cossmannica
- Species: C. jacksonensis

Binomial name
- Cossmannica jacksonensis (Dall & Bartsch, 1906)

Synonyms
- Pyramidella (Cossmannica) jacksonensis Dall & Bartsch, 1906; Pyramidella (Tiberia) pusilla jacksonensis Dall & Bartsch, 1906

= Cossmannica jacksonensis =

Species of gastropod

Cossmannica jacksonensis is a species of sea snail, a marine gastropod mollusk in the family Pyramidellidae, the pyrams and their allies. This species is one of many other species known to exist within the genus, Cossmannica.

== Description ==
The length of the shell measures approximately 6.1 mm. The teleoconch contains eight whorls.

== Distribution ==
This marine species occurs off the coasts of Queensland, Australia, within the Great Barrier Reef and other various marine areas nearby.
