= Peristichia hermosa =

Scientific classification
- Kingdom: Animalia
- Phylum: Mollusca
- Class: Gastropoda
- Family: Pyramidellidae
- Genus: Peristichia
- Species: P. hermosa

Binomial name
- Peristichia hermosa (Lowe, 1935)

Species of gastropod

Peristichia hermosa is a species of sea snail, a marine gastropod mollusk in the family Pyramidellidae, the pyrams and their allies.
