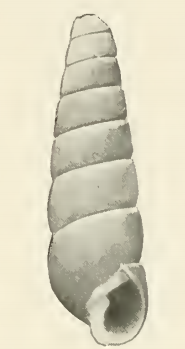
- Drawing of a shell of Orinella africana

Scientific classification
- Kingdom: Animalia
- Phylum: Mollusca
- Class: Gastropoda
- Family: Pyramidellidae
- Genus: Orinella
- Species: O. africana

Binomial name
- Orinella africana (Bartsch, 1915)

Synonyms
- Pyramidella (Orinella) africana Bartsch, 1915 (basionym)

= Orinella africana =

Species of gastropod

Orinella africana is a species of sea snail, a marine gastropod mollusk in the family Pyramidellidae, the pyrams and their allies.

== Description ==
The light-brown shell has an elongate-conic shape. The length measures 6.1 mm. The two whorls of the protoconch are small. They are planorboid, having their axis at right angles to that of the succeeding turns, in the first of which they are very slightly immersed. The eight whorls of the teleoconch are almost flat, and are feebly shouldered at the summit. They are marked by very fine incremental hues, and exceedingly fine spiral striatums. The suture is moderately constricted. The periphery of the body whorl is well rounded. The base of the shell is short, well rounded, and narrowly umbilicated. It is marked like the spire. The aperture is subquadrate. The posterior angle is acute. The outer lip is thin. The inner lip is almost vertical, strongly reflected, and provided with a fold a little anterior to its insertion.

== Distribution ==
This marine species occurs off Port Alfred, South Africa.
