= Ptycheulimella misella =

Scientific classification
- Kingdom: Animalia
- Phylum: Mollusca
- Class: Gastropoda
- Family: Pyramidellidae
- Genus: Ptycheulimella
- Species: P. misella

Binomial name
- Ptycheulimella misella (Yokoyama, 1922)

Species of gastropod

Ptycheulimella misella is a species of sea snail, a marine gastropod mollusk in the family Pyramidellidae, the pyrams and their allies.
