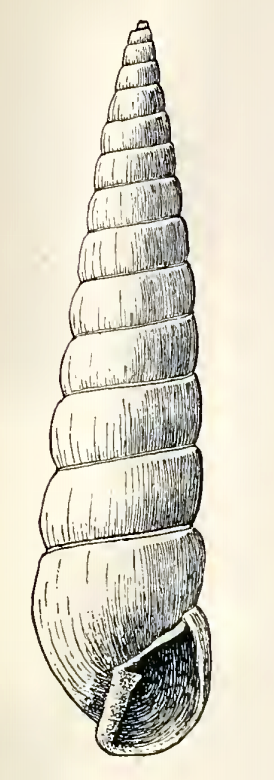
- Drawing of a shell of Cossmannica aciculata

Scientific classification
- Kingdom: Animalia
- Phylum: Mollusca
- Class: Gastropoda
- Family: Pyramidellidae
- Genus: Cossmannica
- Species: C. aciculata

Binomial name
- Cossmannica aciculata A. Adams, 1854

Synonyms
- Obeliscus aciculatus A. Adams, 1854 (basionym); Pyramidella (Cossmannica) aciculata Dall & Bartsch, 1904

= Cossmannica aciculata =

Species of gastropod

Cossmannica aciculata is a species of sea snail, a marine gastropod mollusk in the family Pyramidellidae, the pyrams and their allies.

== Description ==
The elongate-conic shell tapers to an extremely slender apex. The polished shell is white, with a slight suffusion of brown at the apex and near the aperture. Its length measures 17.3 mm. The two whorls of the protoconch are large, compared with the early whorls of the teleoconch, helicoid, depressed, smooth, having their axis almost at a right angle to the axis of the later whorls and extending beyond the outline of these on the left side. The first three whorls of the teleoconch are well rounded, the next five considerably flattened, the seven others decidedly obese. The first five are vitreous, but as the shell grows older it gradually becomes milk-white. The summits of the whorls are closely appressed to the preceding whorl, the appressed portion appearing as a narrow band, which at first sight appears as the suture. This, however, is very inconspicuous. All the whorls of the teleoconch are marked by fine lines of growth and fine, closely placed, wavy spiral striations. The periphery and the base of the body whorl are well rounded. They are marked by lines of growth and spiral striations as between the sutures. The area immediately adjoining the columella is decidedly depressed, forming a pit, but the axis is not perforate. The aperture is auriform, moderately large, and oblique. The posterior angle is acute, slightly channeled at the junction of the outer lip and columella. The columella is rather strong, very oblique, revolute showing only the lamellar posterior fold when the lip is complete. This fold is situated a little anterior to the insertion of the columella. The parietal wall is covered by a decided callus. Specimens having the outer lip fractured show the well-developed, very oblique anterior fold, also seven spiral lirations all of which but the anterior one, which is stronger, are subequal and subequally spaced.

== Distribution ==
This marine species has a wide distribution. It occurs off the coasts of Japan, the Hawaiian Islands and the shires situated throughout Northern Queensland, Australia.
