= Agatha virgo =

Scientific classification
- Kingdom: Animalia
- Phylum: Mollusca
- Class: Gastropoda
- Family: Pyramidellidae
- Genus: Agatha
- Species: A. virgo

Binomial name
- Agatha virgo A. Adams, 1860

Species of gastropod

Agatha virgo is a species of sea snail, a marine gastropod mollusk in the family Pyramidellidae, the pyrams and their allies. The species is one of the two species within the Agatha genus, with the exception of the other related species being Agatha georgiana.

== Distribution ==
- Marine
