= Epigrus insularis =

Scientific classification
- Kingdom: Animalia
- Phylum: Mollusca
- Class: Gastropoda
- Subclass: Caenogastropoda
- Order: Littorinimorpha
- Family: Epigridae
- Genus: Epigrus
- Species: E. insularis

Binomial name
- Epigrus insularis Oliver, 1915

Species of gastropod

"Epigrus" insularis is a species of sea snail, a marine gastropod mollusk in the family Pyramidellidae, the pyrams and their allies. The species is thought not to belong to the genus Epigrus, but is of uncertain placement in the family Pyramidellidae.

== Distribution ==
This marine species occurs off the Kermadec Islands.
