= Costosyrnola thailandica =

Scientific classification
- Kingdom: Animalia
- Phylum: Mollusca
- Class: Gastropoda
- Family: Pyramidellidae
- Genus: Costosyrnola
- Species: C. thailandica

Binomial name
- Costosyrnola thailandica Robba, Di Geronimo, Chaimanee, Negri & Sanfilippo, 2004

Synonyms
- Syrnola (Costosyrnola) thailandica (Robba, Di Geronimo, Chaimanee, Negri & Sanfilippo, 2003)

Species of gastropod

Costosyrnola thailandica is a species of sea snail, a marine gastropod mollusc in the family Pyramidellidae, the pyrams and their allies. The species is one of a number within the genus Costosyrnola. The other species being Costosyrnola nitidissima.

== Distribution ==
This marine species occurs off the Gulf of Thailand.
