= Costosyrnola nitidissima =

Scientific classification
- Kingdom: Animalia
- Phylum: Mollusca
- Class: Gastropoda
- Family: Pyramidellidae
- Genus: Costosyrnola
- Species: C. nitidissima

Binomial name
- Costosyrnola nitidissima (Issel, 1869)

Synonyms
- Turbonilla nitidissima Issel, 1869

Species of gastropod

Costosyrnola nitidissima is a species of sea snail, a marine gastropod mollusk in the family Pyramidellidae, the pyrams and their allies. The species is one of two known species to exist within the genus, Costosyrnola. The other species being Costosyrnola thailandica.

== Distribution ==
Much like many other mollusks in this family of gastropods, this species occurs mainly throughout the Red Sea.
