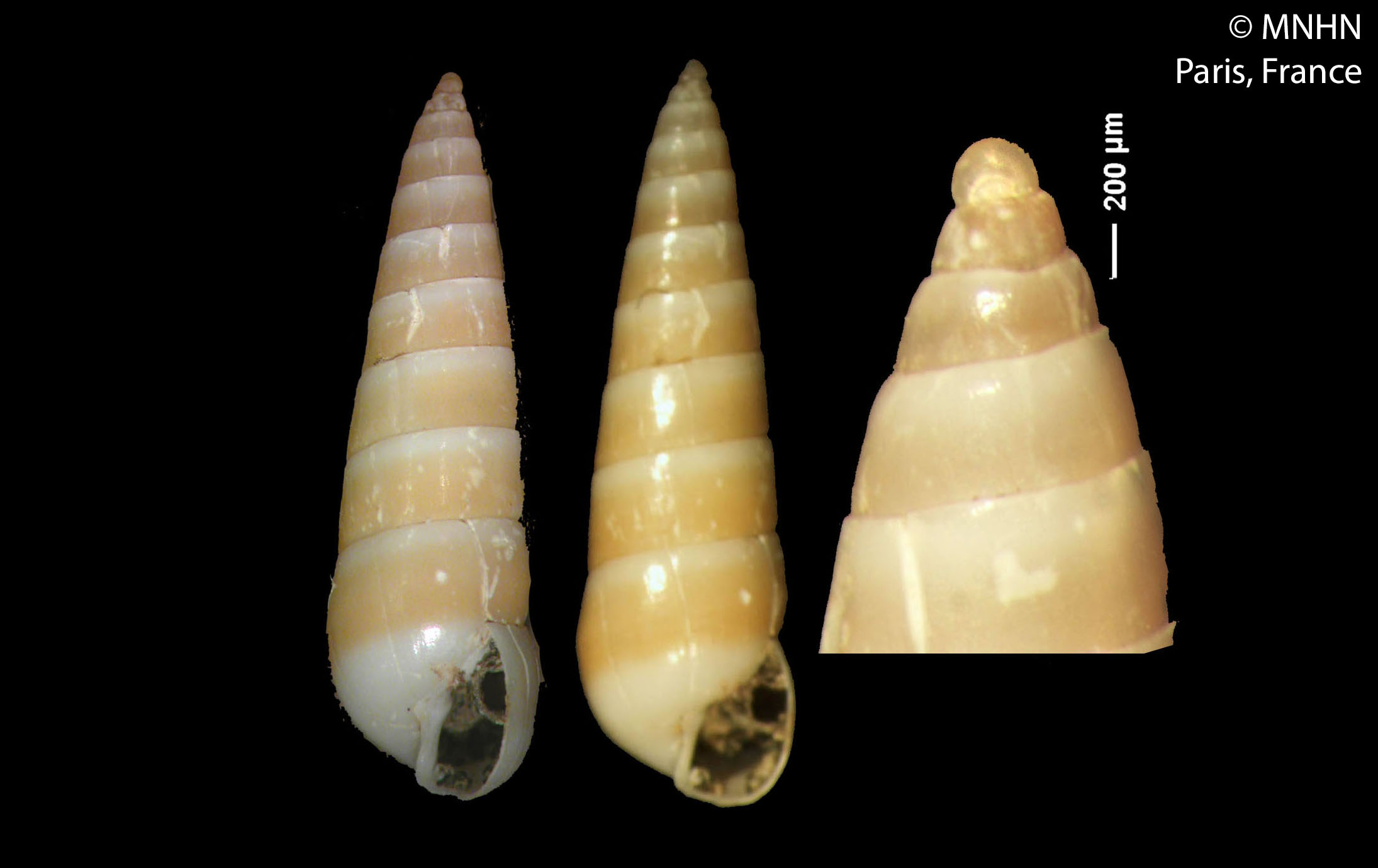
- Shell of Colsyrnola semiaurea (holotype at the National Museum of Natural History, France)

Scientific classification
- Kingdom: Animalia
- Phylum: Mollusca
- Class: Gastropoda
- Family: Pyramidellidae
- Subfamily: Syrnolinae
- Tribe: Syrnolini
- Genus: Colsyrnola; Iredale, 1929

Type species
- Colsyrnola sericea Iredale, 1929

= Colsyrnola =

Genus of gastropods

Colsyrnola is a small genus of minute sea snails within the subfamily Syrnolinae (Pyramidellidae).

== Species ==
As of 2020, the World Register of Marine Species accepts seven species within the genus Colsyrnola:

- Colsyrnola brunnea (A. Adams, 1854)
- Colsyrnola decolorata Iredale, 1936
- Colsyrnola margarita Laseron, 1959
- Colsyrnola ornata (Gould, 1861)
- Colsyrnola semiaurea Peñas & Rolán, 2016
- Colsyrnola sericea Iredale, 1929
- Colsyrnola translucida Laseron, 1959
