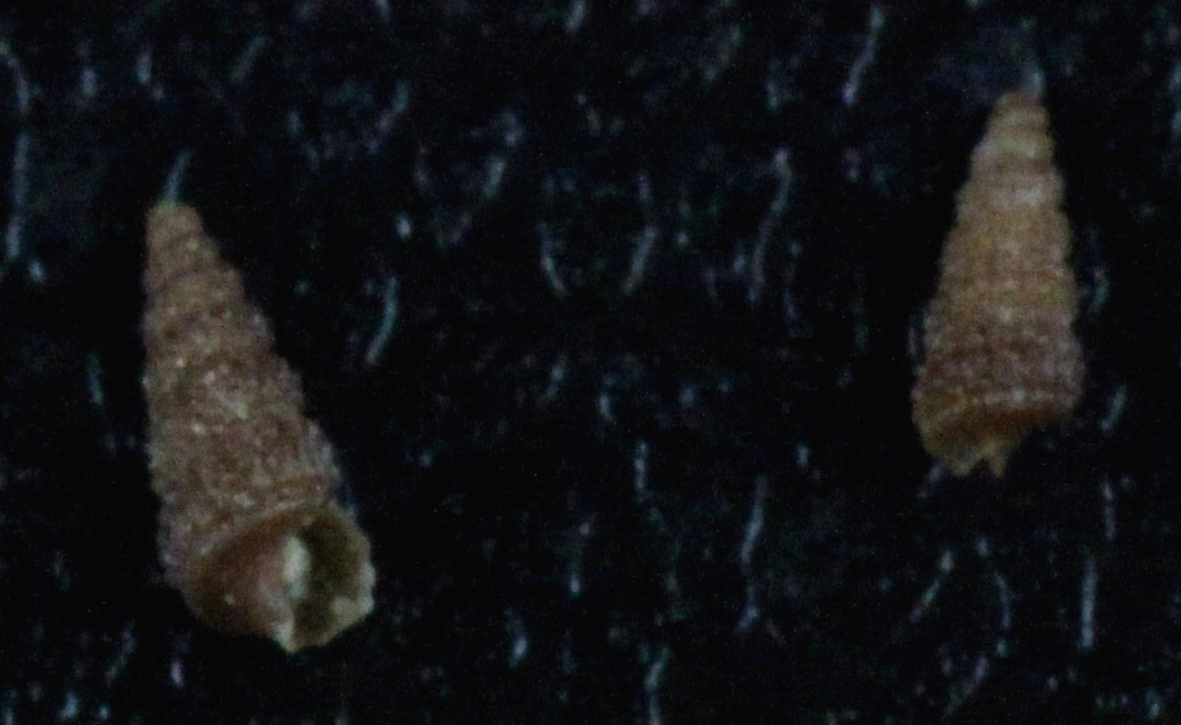
- Apertural and abapertural views of Peristichia pedroana

Scientific classification
- Kingdom: Animalia
- Phylum: Mollusca
- Class: Gastropoda
- Family: Pyramidellidae
- Genus: Peristichia
- Species: P. pedroana

Binomial name
- Peristichia pedroana (Dall & Bartsch, 1909)

= Peristichia pedroana =

Species of gastropod

Peristichia pedroana is a species of sea snail, a marine gastropod mollusk in the family Pyramidellidae, the pyrams and their allies.
