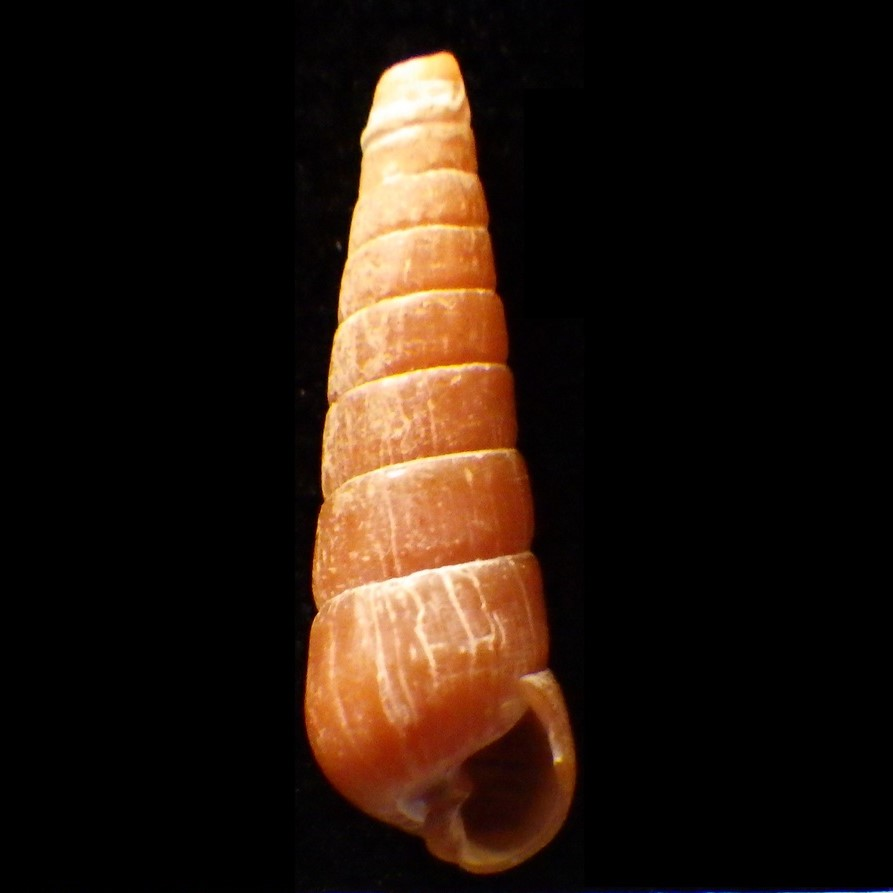

Scientific classification
- Kingdom: Animalia
- Phylum: Mollusca
- Class: Gastropoda
- Family: Pyramidellidae
- Genus: Colsyrnola
- Species: C. brunnea

Binomial name
- Colsyrnola brunnea (A. Adams, 1854)

Synonyms
- Obeliscus brunneus A. Adams, 1854; Obeliscus buxeus Gould, 1861; Pyramidella fulva Sowerby II, 1865; Syrnola brunnea (A. Adams, 1854)

= Colsyrnola brunnea =

Species of gastropod

Colsyrnola brunnea is a species of sea snail, a marine gastropod mollusk in the family Pyramidellidae, the pyrams and their allies.

== Description ==
The light brown, shining shell has an elongate-conic shape. The length of the shell measures 17.6 mm. The 2½ whorls of the protoconch are small and polished, and have a depressed helicoid shape. Their axis is at a right angle to the axis of the later whorls and about one-sixth immersed in the first of them. The sixteen whorls of the teleoconch are flattened, slightly shouldered, and rather low between the sutures. They are marked only by lines of growth and microscopic spiral striae. The sutures are subchanneled and minutely crenulated. The periphery and the base of body whorl are well rounded. They are marked like the spaces between the sutures. The aperture is suboval. The posterior angle is acute. The outer lip is thin. The columella is short, somewhat twisted and revolute. It bears a strong oblique fold a little anterior to its insertion. The parietal wall is covered by a thin callus.

== Distribution ==
This marine species occurs off Japan.
