= Tiberia apicifusca =

Scientific classification
- Kingdom: Animalia
- Phylum: Mollusca
- Class: Gastropoda
- Family: Pyramidellidae
- Genus: Tiberia
- Species: T. apicifusca

Binomial name
- Tiberia apicifusca van Aartsen, Gittenberger & Goud, 1998

Species of gastropod

Tiberia apicifusca is a species of minute sea snail, a marine gastropod mollusk in the family Pyramidellidae, the pyrams and their allies.

== Description ==
The length of shell varies between 4.5 mm and 5 mm.

== Distribution ==
This species occurs in the following locations:

- Cape Verdes at depths between 273 m and 970 m.
