= Tiberia analoga =

Scientific classification
- Kingdom: Animalia
- Phylum: Mollusca
- Class: Gastropoda
- Family: Pyramidellidae
- Genus: Tiberia
- Species: T. analoga

Binomial name
- Tiberia analoga van Aartsen & Corgan, 1996

Synonyms
- Pyramidella similis Thiele, 1925

Species of gastropod

Tiberia analoga is a species of minute sea snail, a marine gastropod mollusk in the family Pyramidellidae, the pyrams and their allies.
