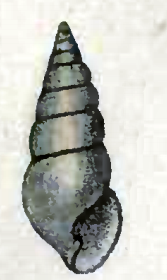
- Drawing of a shell of Tiberia paumotensis

Scientific classification
- Kingdom: Animalia
- Phylum: Mollusca
- Class: Gastropoda
- Family: Pyramidellidae
- Genus: Tiberia
- Species: T. paumotensis

Binomial name
- Tiberia paumotensis (Tryon, 1886)

Synonyms
- Pyramidella hyalina Garrett; Pyramidella paumotensis Tryon, 1886 (basionym)

= Tiberia paumotensis =

Species of gastropod

Tiberia paumotensis is a species of small sea snail, a marine gastropod mollusk in the family Pyramidellidae, the pyrams and their allies.

== Description ==
The thin, smooth, white shell is hyaline. Its length measures 10 mm. The upper whorls suddenly taper to an acute apex. The base of the shell is slightly produced. The teleoconch contains nine convex whorls. The suture is margined. The columella is slightly callous, with two oblique plaits, the lower one most conspicuous, the upper smaller and deep-seated.

== Distribution ==
The type species has been found in the Pacific Ocean off the Tuamotus.
