= Stylopsis marioni =

Scientific classification
- Kingdom: Animalia
- Phylum: Mollusca
- Class: Gastropoda
- Family: Pyramidellidae
- Genus: Stylopsis
- Species: S. marioni

Binomial name
- Stylopsis marioni Locard, 1897

Species of gastropod

Stylopsis marioni is a species of sea snail, a marine gastropod mollusk in the family Pyramidellidae, the pyrams and their allies.

This is a taxon inquirendum.
