= Moerchia obvoluta =

Scientific classification
- Kingdom: Animalia
- Phylum: Mollusca
- Class: Gastropoda
- Family: Pyramidellidae
- Genus: Moerchia
- Species: M. obvoluta

Binomial name
- Moerchia obvoluta A. Adams, 1860

Species of gastropod

Moerchia obvoluta is a species of sea snail, a marine gastropod mollusk in the family Pyramidellidae, the pyrams and their allies.
