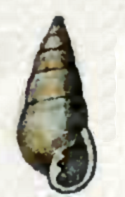
- Drawing of a Tiberia nitidula shell

Scientific classification
- Kingdom: Animalia
- Phylum: Mollusca
- Class: Gastropoda
- Family: Pyramidellidae
- Genus: Tiberia
- Species: T. nitidula

Binomial name
- Tiberia nitidula (A. Adams, 1860)

Synonyms
- Obeliscus nitidula (A. Adams, 1860); Pyramidella nitidula (A. Adams, 1860); Syrnola nitidula A. Adams, 1860 (original combination)

= Tiberia nitidula =

Species of gastropod

Tiberia nitidula is a species of sea snail, a marine gastropod mollusk in the family Pyramidellidae, the pyrams and their allies.

== Description ==
The length of the shell measures 7 mm.

== Distribution ==
This species occurs in the Atlantic Ocean off the Azores and Puerto Rico at a depth of 713 m.
