= Cossmannica discreta =

Scientific classification
- Kingdom: Animalia
- Phylum: Mollusca
- Class: Gastropoda
- Family: Pyramidellidae
- Genus: Cossmannica
- Species: C. discreta

Binomial name
- Cossmannica discreta Saurin, 1959

Synonyms
- Pyramidella (Cossmannica) discreta (Saurin, 1959)

Species of gastropod

Cossmannica discreta is a species of sea snail, a marine gastropod mollusc in the family Pyramidellidae, the pyrams and their allies.

== Distribution ==
This marine species occurs off the coasts of Vietnam.
