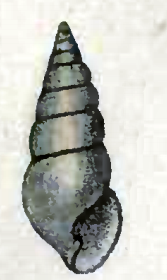

Scientific classification
- Kingdom: Animalia
- Phylum: Mollusca
- Class: Gastropoda
- Family: Pyramidellidae
- Subfamily: Syrnolinae
- Tribe: Tiberiini
- Genus: Tiberia; Jeffreys, 1884

Type species
- Pyramidella (Tiberia) minuscula Monterosato, 1880

Synonyms
- Pyramidella (Tiberia) Dall & Bartsch, 1906; Tiberiinae; Tiberia Jeffreys, 1884; Tiberiola Cossmann, 1900 (unnecessary substitute name for Tiberia Jeffreys, 1884)

= Tiberia =

Genus of gastropods

Tiberia is a genus of minute parasitic sea snails, marine gastropod molluscs in the family Pyramidellidae, the pyrams and their allies. Tiberia is the only genus in the tribe Tiberiini.

== Taxonomy ==
According to Schander, Van Aartsen & Corgan (1999) the subfamily Tiberiinae contains a single genus, Tiberia.

Tiberiinae was one of eleven recognised subfamilies in the family Pyramidellidae according to the taxonomy of Ponder & Lindberg (1997).

However, in the taxonomy of Bouchet & Rocroi (2005), this subfamily was downgraded to the rank of tribe Tiberiini in the subfamily Syrnolinae.

Tiberia is the type genus of the tribe Tiberiini.

== Description ==
The very small shells of the species in this genus have many whorls. They are umbilicate shells that lack both shell sculpture and the apertural tooth or teeth that are characteristic in most other members of the family Pyramidellidae. They may, however, have slight biplicate folds on the columella.

== Species ==
Species in the genus Tiberia include:

- Tiberia analoga van Aartsen & Corgan, 1996
- Tiberia apicifusca van Aartsen, Gittenberger & Goud, 1998
- Tiberia balteata (A. Adams, 1855)
- Tiberia cathaysiae Saurin, 1959
- Tiberia grimaudi Saurin, 1959
- Tiberia hyalina (Dunker, 1860)
- Tiberia minuscula (Monterosato, 1880) - synonym: Tiberia octaviana Di Geronimo, 1973
- Tiberia navella van Aartsen & Corgan, 1996
- Tiberia ngani Saurin, 1959
- Tiberia nitidula (A. Adams, 1860)
- Tiberia ovata Saurin, 1959
- Tiberia paumotensis (Tryon, 1886)
- Tiberia pusilla (A. Adams, 1854)
- Tiberia semicostata Saurin, 1962
- Tiberia thaii Saurin, 1959
- Tiberia trifasciata (A. Adams, 1863)

Species brought into synonymy

- Tiberia balteatus [sic]: synonym of Tiberia balteata (A. Adams, 1855)
- Tiberia dunkeri (Dall & Bartsch, 1906): synonym of Orinella dunkeri (Dall & Bartsch, 1906)
- Tiberia gisela (Thiele, J., 1925): synonym of Exesilla gisela (Thiele, 1925)
- Tiberia micalii i Penas & Rolan, 1997: synonym of Pyramidella dolabrata (Linnaeus, 1758)
- Tiberia minusculoides (van Aartsen, Gittenberger & Goud, 1998): synonym of Tiberia minuscula (Monterosato, 1880)
- Tiberia nitidula Adams, A., 1860: synonym of Pyramidella dolabrata (Linnaeus, 1758)
- Tiberia octaviana Di Geronimo, 1973: synonym of Tiberia minuscula (Monterosato, 1880)
- Tiberia pretiosa Coen, 1933: synonym of Chrysallida interstincta (J. Adams, 1797): synonym of Parthenina interstincta (J. Adams, 1797)
- Tiberia pulchella (A. Adams, 1854): synonym of Orinella pulchella (A. Adams, 1854)
