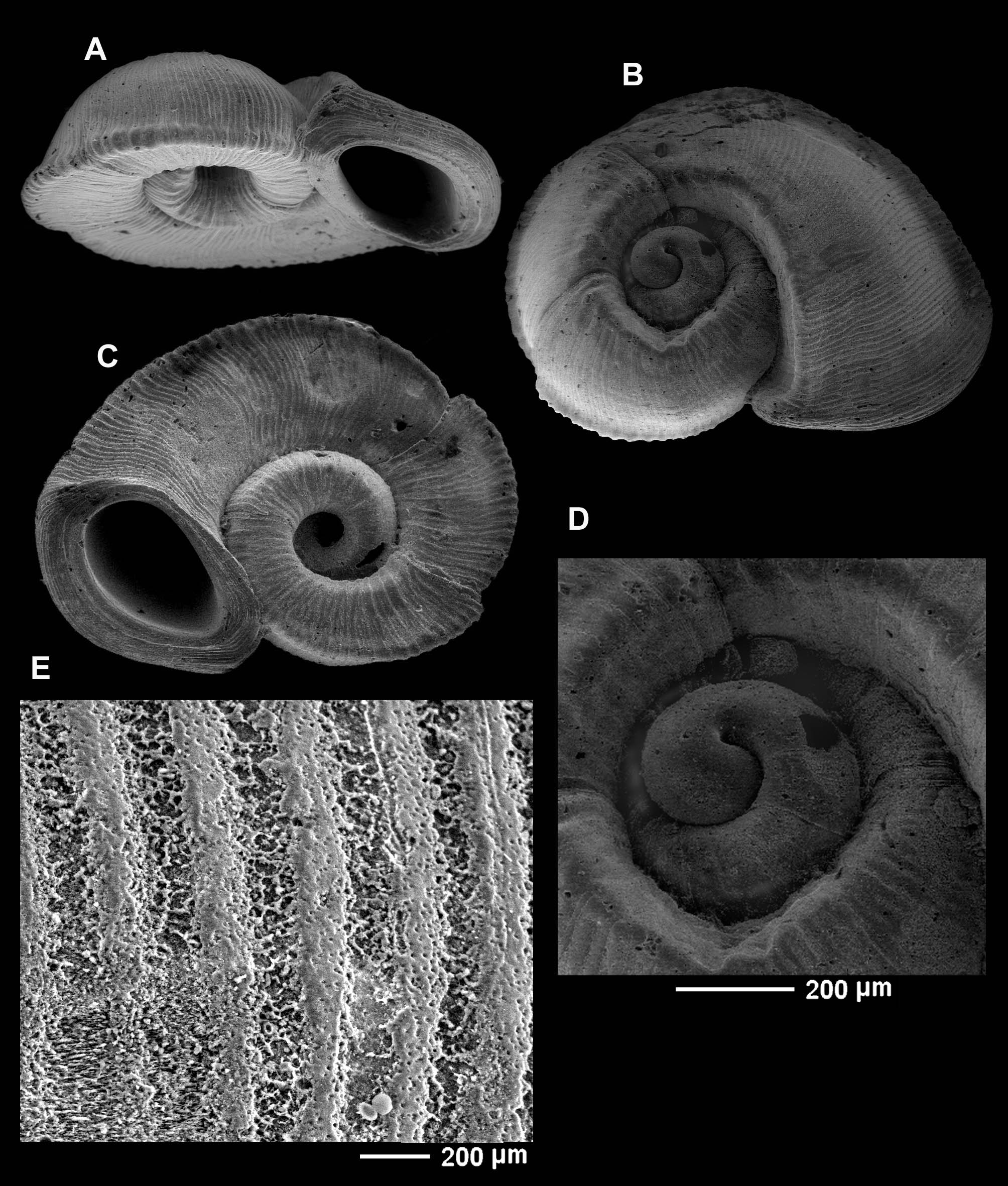
- Shell of Moerchia deformata (holotype at MNHN, Paris)

Scientific classification
- Kingdom: Animalia
- Phylum: Mollusca
- Class: Gastropoda
- Subcohort: Panpulmonata
- Superfamily: Pyramidelloidea
- Family: Pyramidellidae
- Genus: Moerchia; A. Adams, 1860

Type species
- Moerchia obvoluta A. Adams, 1860

Synonyms
- Liotropica Laseron, 1958; Moerchiella Thiele, 1924 (Unnecessary substitute name for Moerchia A. Adams, April 1860, by Thiele believed to be preoccupied by "Albers, 1850" [in fact, Albers December 1860]; see also Moerchinella); Moerchinella Thiele, 1931 (Nom. nov. pro Moerchiella Thiele, 1924, non G. Nevill, 1885, itself an unnecessary substitute name for Moerchia A. Adams, 1860)

= Moerchia =

Genus of gastropods

Moerchia is a genus of sea snails, marine gastropod mollusks in the family Pyramidellidae, the pyrams and their allies.

== Species ==
- Moerchia deformata Rubio & Rolán, 2014
- Moerchia intermedia (Thiele, 1925)
- Moerchia introspecta Hedley, 1907
- Moerchia morleti P. Fischer, 1877
- Moerchia obvoluta A. Adams, 1860
- Moerchia perforata Rubio & Rolán, 2014

Taxon inquirendum

- Moerchia biplicata P. Fischer, 1877
