= Charilda =

Scientific classification
- Kingdom: Animalia
- Phylum: Mollusca
- Class: Gastropoda
- Subcohort: Panpulmonata
- Superfamily: Pyramidelloidea
- Family: Pyramidellidae
- Genus: Charilda; Iredale, 1929

Type species
- Mathilda rosae Hedley, 1901

Genus of gastropods

Charilda is a genus of sea snails, marine gastropod mollusks in the family Pyramidellidae, the pyrams and their allies.

== Species ==
- Charilda rosae (Hedley, 1901)

The following species were brought into synonymy:

- Charilda morisyuichiroi (Habe, 1968): synonym of Bacula morisyuichiroi (Habe, 1968)
