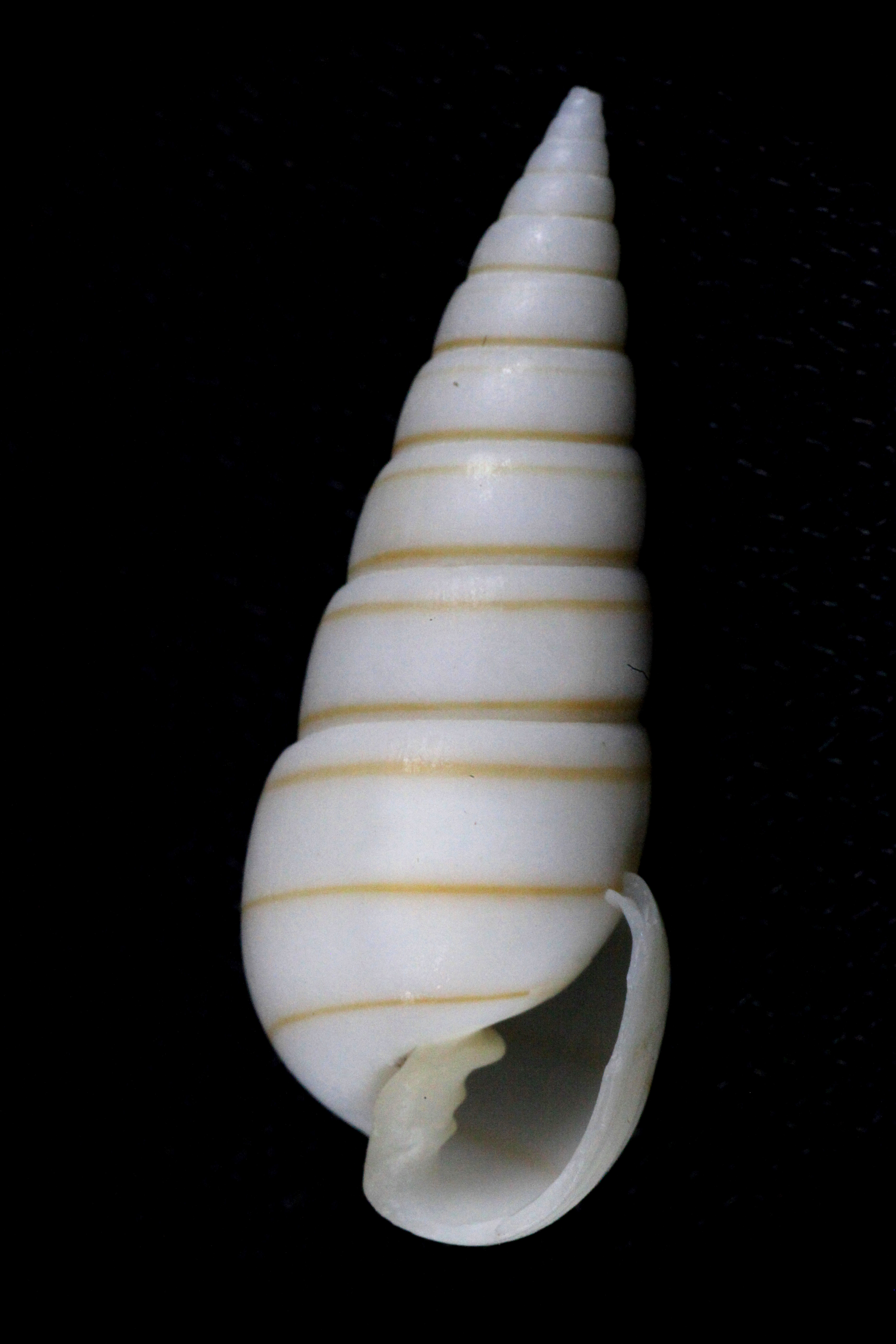
- Shell of Pyramidella dolabrata Linnaeus, 1758, measuring 31.1 mm in height collected in beach drift on shore in Philipsburg, in St. Maarten.

Scientific classification
- Kingdom: Animalia
- Phylum: Mollusca
- Class: Gastropoda
- Family: Pyramidellidae
- Genus: Pyramidella
- Species: P. dolabrata

Binomial name
- Pyramidella dolabrata (Linnaeus, 1758)

Synonyms
- Helix terebellum Müller, 1774; Lonchaeus dolabratus (Linnaeus, 1758); Obeliscus dolobratus (L.); Plotia lineata Röding, 1798; Pyramidella dolabrata terebellum (Müller, 1774); Pyramidella terebellum (Müller, 1774); Sayella micalii Peñas & Rolán, 1997; Tiberia micalii (Peñas & Rolán, 1997); Trochus dolabratus Linnaeus, 1758 (original combination); Urambella ballerina Laseron, 1959

= Pyramidella dolabrata =

Species of gastropod

Pyramidella dolabrata, common name the "giant Atlantic pyram", is a somewhat variable species of small to medium-sized (max size 36 mm) sea snail, a marine gastropod mollusk in the (mostly minute) family Pyramidellidae, the pyram snails.

== Description ==
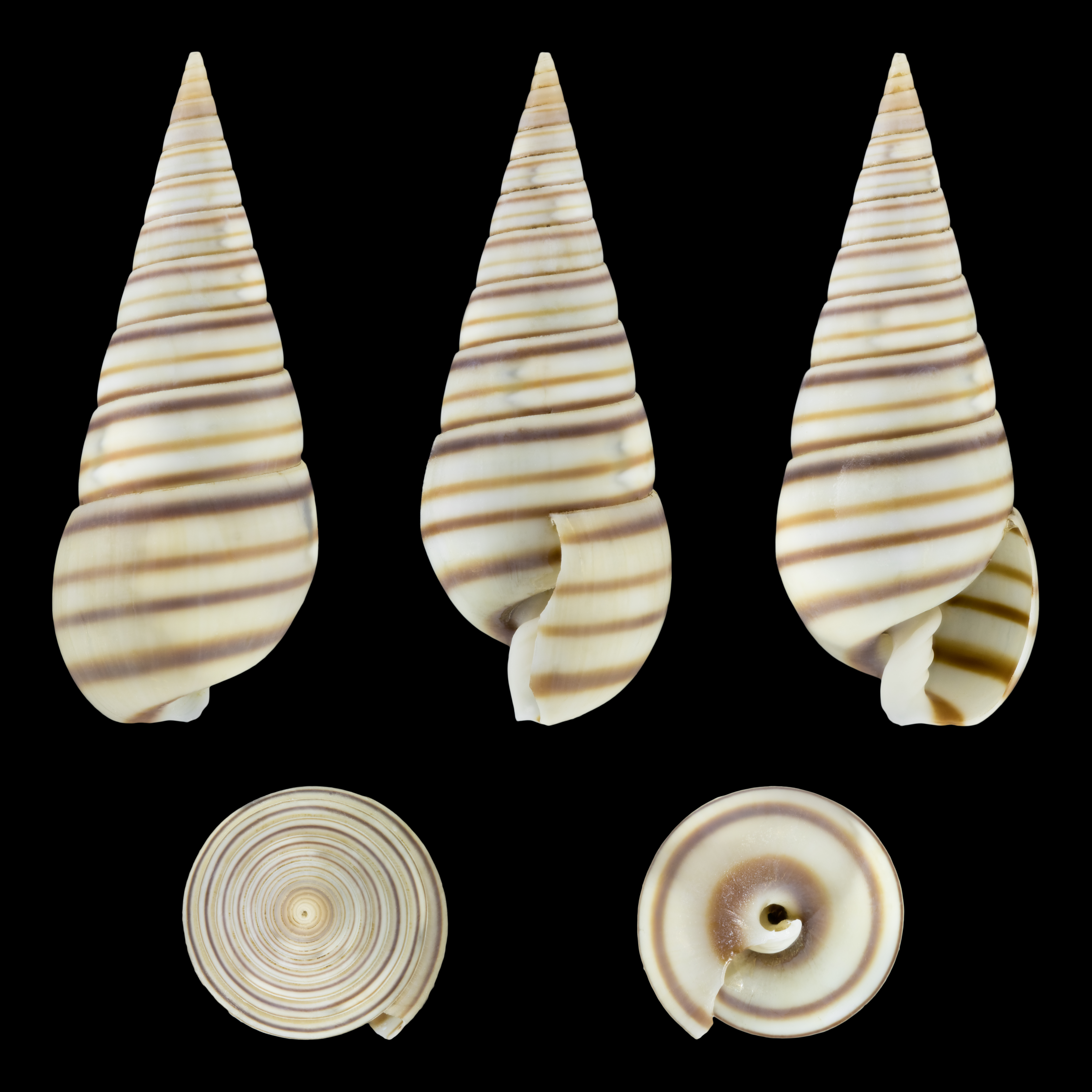
Pyramidella dolabrata var. terebellum

The length of the shell varies between 14 mm and 36 mm.

The white shell is conical, turreted, polished, elongated, slightly transparent. It has three or four transverse, narrow reddish or chestnut spiral lines on the body whorl, and two on the whorls of the teleoconch. The middle band s always narrowest; the others are wider and deeper colored. The pointed spire is composed of from ten to twelve distinct, smooth, slightly convex whorls. The body whorl is more inflated than the other whorls. The shell is smooth and umbilicated. The ovate aperture is subrotund at its base, and generally marked within, with very prominent ridges continued upon some specimens even to the edge of the sharp outer lip. The outer lip is often lirate within. The columella is slightly arcuated, recurved around the umbilicus. It is furnished at its base with three folds, the upper of which is more prominent than the others. The small umbilicus is cylindrical, narrow and deep. The maximum recorded shell length is 36 mm.

== Anatomy ==
The complete nucleotide sequence of the mitochondrial genome of Pyramidella dolabrata has been available since 2008.

== Distribution ==
This marine species has a wide distribution. It has been recorded in:

- The Caribbean Sea, the Gulf of Mexico, the Lesser Antilles
- The Atlantic Ocean off the Cape Verdes, St. Helena, São Tomé and Príncipe, Angola, West Africa
- The Indian Ocean : off Madagascar, Mauritius
- The Indo-Pacific Region.

== Habitat ==
The minimum recorded depth for this species is 0 m. The maximum recorded depth is 57 m.
