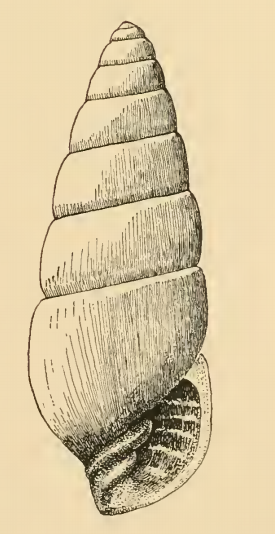
- Apertural view of a shell of Cossmannica jacksonensis

Scientific classification
- Kingdom: Animalia
- Phylum: Mollusca
- Class: Gastropoda
- Family: Pyramidellidae
- Genus: Cossmannica; Dall & Bartsch, 1904

Synonyms
- Diptychus Cossmann, 1888

= Cossmannica =

Genus of gastropods

Cossmannica is a genus of sea snails, marine gastropod mollusks in the family Pyramidellidae, the pyrams and their allies.

== Description ==
The surface of the shell is polished, marked by faint lines of growth and microscopic spiral striations. The shell is not umbilicated. The basal fasciole is absent. The aperture is suboval. There are two columellar folds.

== Species ==
There are nine known species within the genus Cossmannica, these include the following:

- Cossmannica aciculata A. Adams, 1855
- Cossmannica bancoensis Saurin, 1959
- Cossmannica behainei Saurin, 1959
- Cossmannica catinati Saurin, 1959
- Cossmannica champaensis Saurin, 1959
- Cossmannica discreta Saurin, 1959
- Cossmannica exesa Laseron, 1959
- Cossmannica jacksonensis (Dall & Bartsch, 1906)
- Cossmannica subcarina Laseron, 1959
