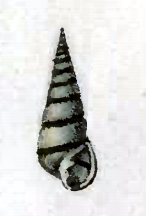
- Drawing of a shell of Tiberia pulchella

Scientific classification
- Kingdom: Animalia
- Phylum: Mollusca
- Class: Gastropoda
- Family: Pyramidellidae
- Genus: Tiberia
- Species: T. pulchella

Binomial name
- Tiberia pulchella (A. Adams, 1854)

Synonyms
- Obeliscus pulchellus A. Adams, 1854; Orinella pulchella (A. Adams, 1854); Pyramidella (Tiberia) pulchella (A. Adams, 1854); Syrnola pulchella (A. Adams, 1854)

= Tiberia pulchella =

Species of gastropod

Tiberia pulchella is a species of small sea snail, a marine gastropod mollusk in the family Pyramidellidae, the pyrams and their allies.

== Description ==
The shell has a polished appearance. It is yellowish white, with a sutural chocolate band, appearing on the periphery of the body whorl. The columella has two plications.

== Distribution ==
This marine species occurs in the Pacific Ocean off Japan, Korea, and China.
