= Peristichia pliocena =

Scientific classification
- Kingdom: Animalia
- Phylum: Mollusca
- Class: Gastropoda
- Family: Pyramidellidae
- Genus: Peristichia
- Species: P. pliocena

Binomial name
- Peristichia pliocena (Bartsch, 1955)

Synonyms
- † Triptychus pliocena Bartsch, 1955

Species of gastropod

Peristichia pliocena is a species of sea snail, a marine gastropod mollusk in the family Pyramidellidae, the pyrams and their allies.

== Description ==
The shell grows to a length of 4.5 mm.

== Distribution ==
This species occurs in the following locations:

- Gulf of Mexico
