= Derjuginella rufofasciata =

Scientific classification
- Kingdom: Animalia
- Phylum: Mollusca
- Class: Gastropoda
- Family: Pyramidellidae
- Genus: Derjuginella
- Species: D. rufofasciata

Binomial name
- Derjuginella rufofasciata (E.A. Smith, 1875)

Synonyms
- Stylopsis rufofasciata E.A. Smith, 1875; Syrnola hanagaiensis Nomura, 1938; Turbonilla acosta Bartsch, 1919; Turbonilla petri Bartsch, 1919; Turbonilla vladivostokensis Bartsch, 1929

Species of gastropod

Derjuginella rufofasciata is a species of sea snail, a marine gastropod mollusk in the family Pyramidellidae, the pyrams and their allies. This species is the only known species to exist within the genus, Derjuginella.

== Distribution ==
This marine species occurs off the coasts of Japan, within the Sea of Japan respectively.
