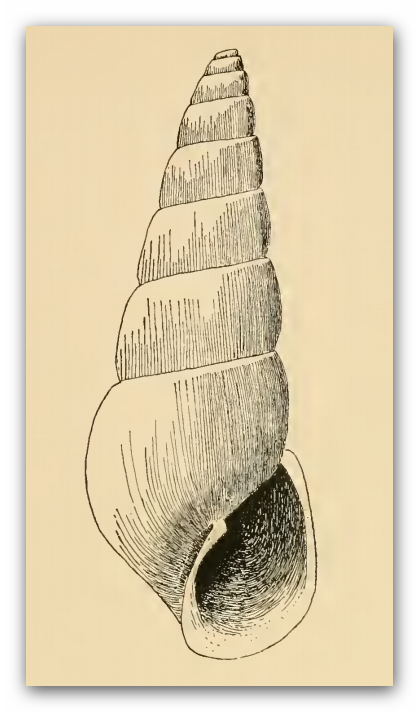
- Apertural view of the shell of Odostomia desimana

Scientific classification
- Kingdom: Animalia
- Phylum: Mollusca
- Class: Gastropoda
- Family: Pyramidellidae
- Genus: Odostomia
- Species: O. desimana

Binomial name
- Odostomia desimana Dall & Bartsch, 1906

Synonyms
- Odostomia laetea Dunker,1860; Odostomia (Odostomia) desimana Dall & Bartsch, 1906

= Odostomia desimana =

Species of gastropod

Odostomia desimana is a species of sea snail, a marine gastropod mollusc in the family Pyramidellidae, the pyrams and their allies.

== Description ==
The milk-white shell has a regularly elongate-conic shape. It measures 6.7 mm. The whorls of the protoconch are small, obliquely almost completely immersed in the first of the succeeding whorls, only the periphery of the last two being visible. The nine whorls of the teleoconch are rather high between the sutures, very slightly rounded, slightly angulated at the periphery and scarcely at all shouldered. They are marked by scarcely perceptible lines of growth, and here and there by a faint trace of some very fine microscopic spiral lines. The summit of succeeding whorls falls somewhat anterior to the periphery of the preceding turns, which gives a slightly constricted appearance at the well-impressed suture. The periphery of the body whorl is faintly angulated. The base of the shell is large, well rounded, narrowly umbilicated and somewhat effuse at the junction of the lip and columella. The posterior angle is acute. The outer lip is thin. The long columella is slender, almost straight, somewhat revolute, bearing a strong oblique fold near its insertion. The parietal wall is covered by a thin callus.

== Distribution ==
This species occurs in the Pacific Ocean off Japan.
