= Syrnolinae =

Scientific classification
- Kingdom: Animalia
- Phylum: Mollusca
- Class: Gastropoda
- Family: Pyramidellidae
- Subfamily: Syrnolinae; Saurin, 1958

Genera
- See text.

Subfamily of gastropods

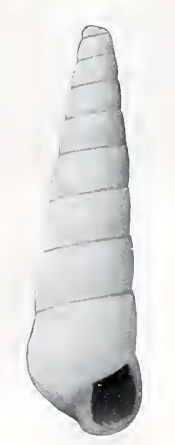

Syrnolininae is a subfamily of minute parasitic sea snails, marine heterobranch gastropod molluscs in the family Pyramidellidae, the pyrams and their allies.

== Taxonomy ==
According to the taxonomy of Ponder & Lindberg (1997), this was one of eleven recognised subfamilies in the family Pyramidellidae.

In the taxonomy of Bouchet & Rocroi (2005), this subfamily also comprises the subfamily Tiberiinae, downgraded to the rank of tribe Tiberiini.

Subfamily Syrnolinae Saurin, 1958

- Tribe Syrnolini Saurin, 1958
- Tribe Tiberiini Saurin, 1958 - formerly subfamily Tiberiinae

== Genera ==
Genera in the subfamily Syrnolinae include:

tribe Syrnolini

- Adelactaeon Cossmann, 1895 : now belongs to the family Amathinidae
- Agatha A. Adams, 1860
- Amathis A. Adams, 1861
- Colsyrnola Iredale, 1829
- Costosyrnola Laws, 1937
- Cricocolphus Weisbord, 1962
- Derjuginella Habe, 1958
- Iphiana Dall & Bartsch, 1904
- Adelactaeon Saurin, 1958
- Orinella Dall & Bartsch, 1904
- Pachysyrnola Cossmann, 1907
- Ptycheulimella Sacco, 1892
- Puposyrnola Cossmann, 1921
- Rissosyrnola Nomura, 1939
- Stylopsis A. Adams, 1860
- Styloptygma A. Adams, 1860
- Syrnola A. Adams, 1860 - the type genus of the tribe Syrnolini
- Syrnolina Dall & Bartsch, 1904
- Tibersyrnola Laws, 1937
- Tropaeas Dall & Bartsch, 1904

tribe Tiberiini

- Tiberia Monterosato, 1875 - There is only one genus in the tribe Tiberiini.
