= Epigrus =

Scientific classification
- Kingdom: Animalia
- Phylum: Mollusca
- Class: Gastropoda
- Subclass: Caenogastropoda
- Order: Littorinimorpha
- Family: Epigridae
- Genus: Epigrus; Hedley, 1903

Type species
- Rissoa ischna Tate, 1899

Genus of molluscs

Epigrus is a genus of gastropods belonging to the family Epigridae.

The species of this genus are found in Australia.

Species:

- Epigrus columnaria (May, 1911)
- Epigrus cylindraceus (Tenison Woods, 1878)
- Epigrus insularis Oliver, 1915
- Epigrus iravadioides Gatliff & Gabriel, 1913
- Epigrus obesus Laseron, 1956
- Epigrus truncatus Laseron, 1956

Species brought into synonymy

- Epigrus borda Cotton, 1944: synonym of Epigrus cylindraceus (Tenison Woods, 1878)
- Epigrus dissimilis (R. B. Watson, 1886): synonym of Epigrus cylindraceus (Tenison Woods, 1878)
- Epigrus fossilis Finlay, 1924 †: synonym of Chevallieria fossilis (Finlay, 1924) †
- Epigrus gracilis W. R. B. Oliver, 1915: synonym of Rissopsetia gracilis (W. R. B. Oliver, 1915)
- Epigrus ischnus (Tate, 1899): synonym of Epigrus cylindraceus (Tenison Woods, 1878)
- Epigrus pakaurangia Laws, 1944 †: synonym of Chevallieria pakaurangia (Laws, 1944) † (original combination)
- Epigrus prostriatus Laws, 1950 †: synonym of Microdryas prostriatus (Laws, 1950) †
- Epigrus protractus Hedley, 1904: synonym of Badepigrus protractus (Hedley, 1904) (original combination)
- Epigrus semicinctus May, 1915: synonym of Badepigrus semicinctus (May, 1915) (original combination)
- Epigrus striatus Powell, 1927: synonym of Microdryas striatus (Powell, 1927) (original combination)
- Epigrus waitotarana Laws, 1940 †: synonym of Chevallieria waitotarana (Laws, 1940) † (original combination)
