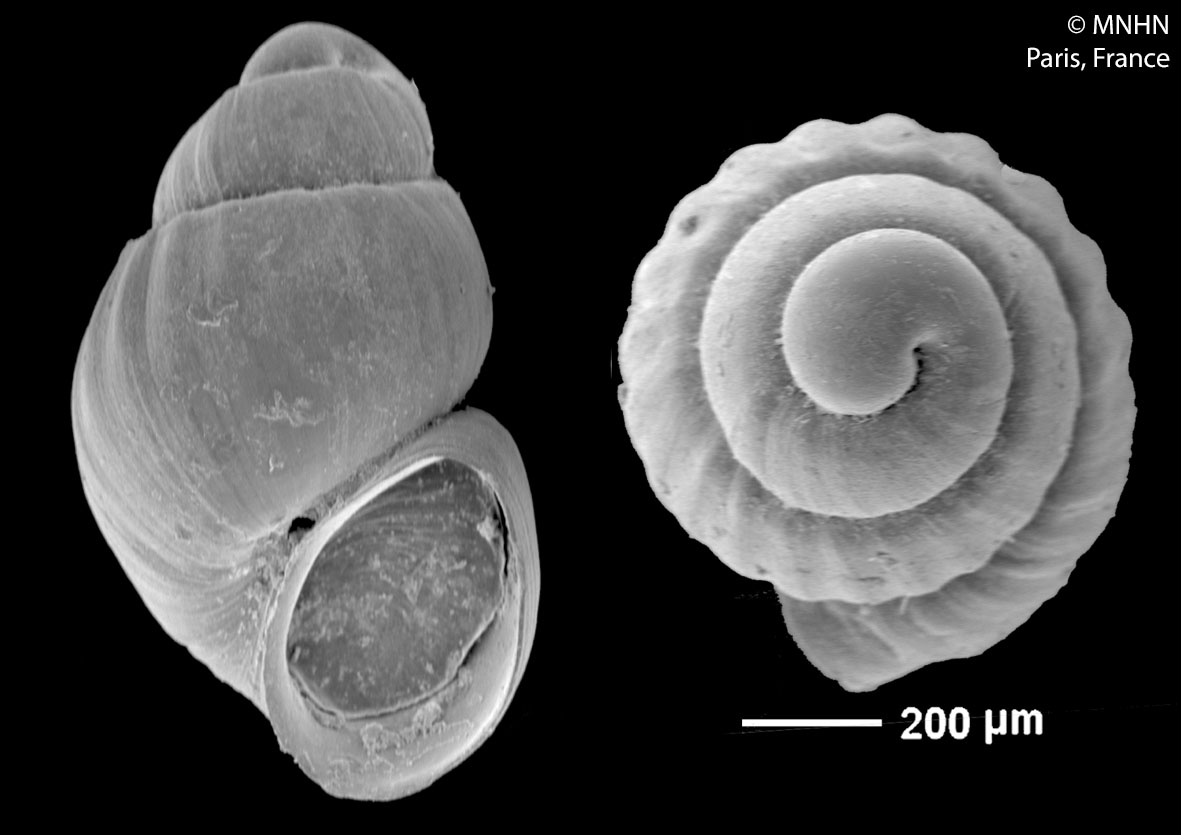
- Shell of Perheida semenformis (holotype at MNHN, Paris)

Scientific classification
- Kingdom: Animalia
- Phylum: Mollusca
- Class: Gastropoda
- Subcohort: Panpulmonata
- Superfamily: Pyramidelloidea
- Family: Pyramidellidae
- Genus: Perheida; Peñas & Rolán, 2017

Type species
- Perheida semenformis Peñas & Rolán, 2017

= Perheida =

Genus of sea snails

Perheida is a genus of minute sea snails, marine gastropod mollusks or micromollusks in the family Pyramidellidae, the pyrams and their allies.

== Species ==
- Perheida semenformis Peñas & Rolán, 2017
