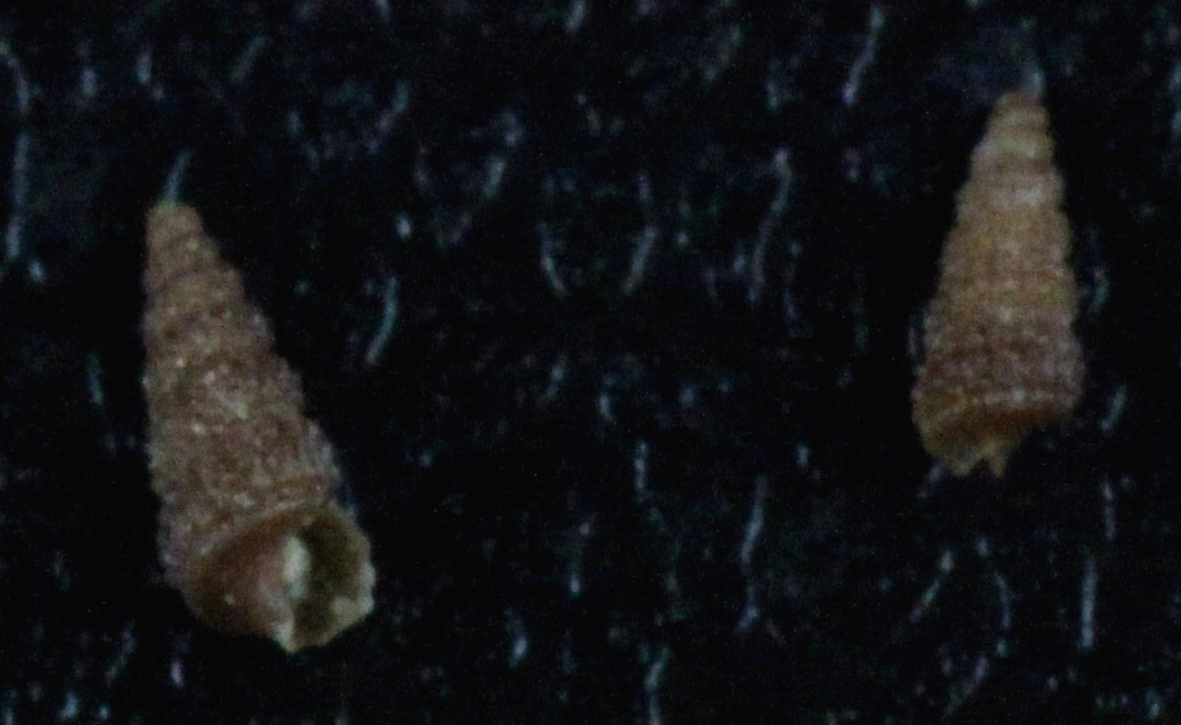
- Peristichia pedroana (Dall & Bartsch, 1909)

Scientific classification
- Kingdom: Animalia
- Phylum: Mollusca
- Class: Gastropoda
- Subcohort: Panpulmonata
- Superfamily: Pyramidelloidea
- Family: Pyramidellidae
- Genus: Peristichia; W.H. Dall, 1889

Type species
- Peristichia toreta Dall, 1889

= Peristichia =

Genus of gastropods

Peristichia is a genus of sea snails, marine gastropod mollusks in the family Pyramidellidae, the pyrams and their allies.

== Taxonomy ==
In his original paper, Dall proposed Peristichia as a genus of dubious affinities and placed it later in the family Pyramidellidae. Paul Bartsch, his collaborator, later thought it was a subgenus of Turbonilla. Johannes Thiele does not even mention this genus in his Handbuch der Systematischen Weichtierkunde. (1929). Wilhelm August Wenz in his Handbuch der Paläozoologie, Band 6, Gastropoda, also thought it was probably a subgenus of Turbonilla, but added a question mark. However, a close examination shows that it belongs in the family Pyramidellidae, close to Tryptichus Mörch, 1875, differing from it only in having one (instead of two) basal central spiral cords and having no columellar fold.

== Species ==
Species within the genus Peristichia include:

- Peristichia agria Dall, 1889
- Peristichia bathyraphe (G.B. Sowerby I, 1901)
- Peristichia hermosa (Lowe, 1935)
- Peristichia lepta Pimenta, Santos & Absalao, 2008
- Peristichia pedroana (Dall & Bartsch, 1909)
- Peristichia pliocena (Bartsch, 1955)
- Peristichia toreta Dall, 1889
