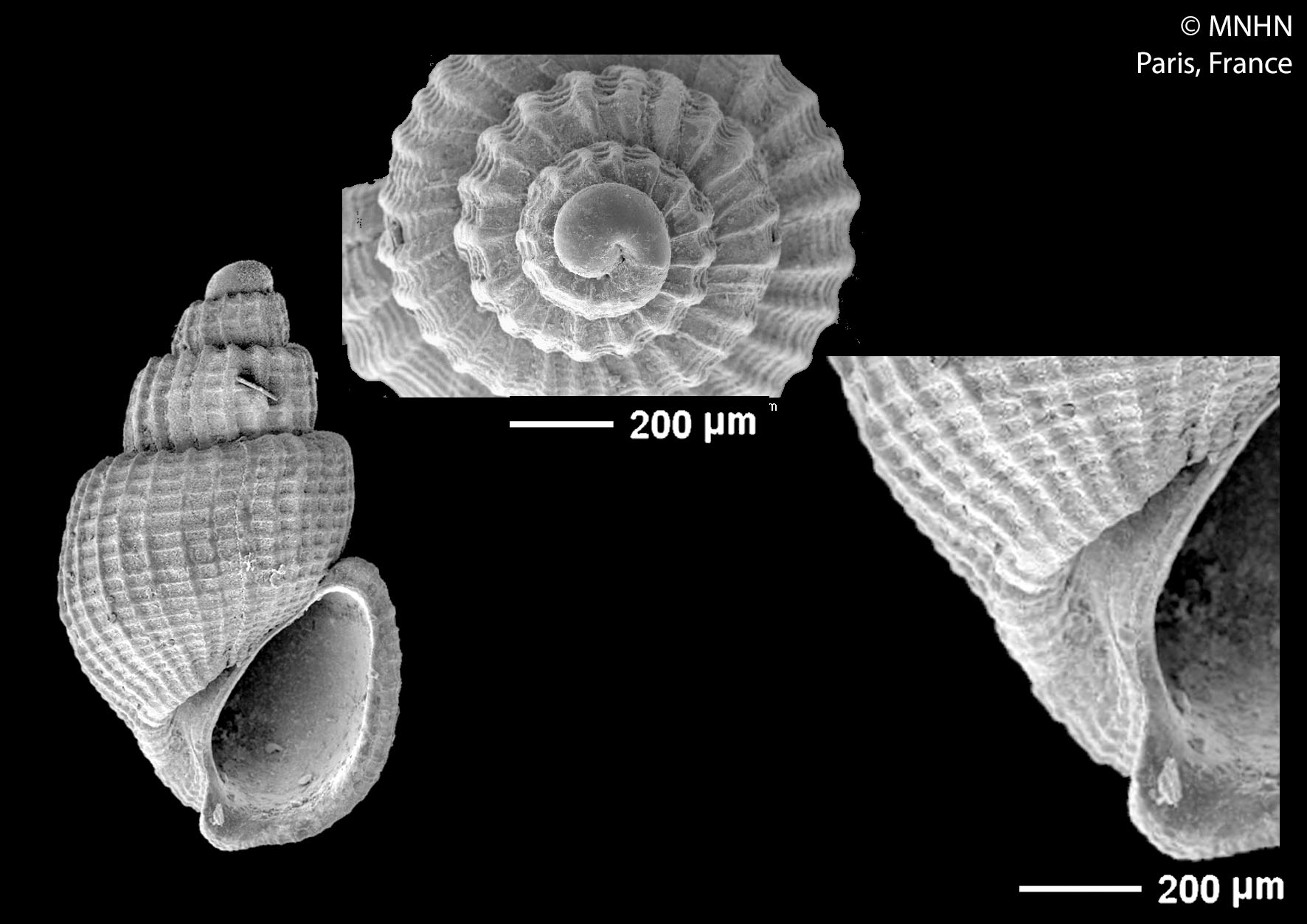
- Shell of Maricarmenia accresta (holotype at MNHN, Paris)

Scientific classification
- Kingdom: Animalia
- Phylum: Mollusca
- Class: Gastropoda
- Subcohort: Panpulmonata
- Superfamily: Pyramidelloidea
- Family: Pyramidellidae
- Genus: Maricarmenia; Peñas & Rolán, 2017

Type species
- Maricarmenia accresta Peñas & Rolán, 2017

= Maricarmenia =

Genus of gastropods

Maricarmenia is a genus of very small sea snails, marine gastropod mollusk in the family Pyramidellidae, the pyrams and their allies.

== Species ==
Species within the genus Maricarmenia include:

- Maricarmenia accresta Peñas & Rolán, 2017 (length 1.9 mm)

== Distribution ==
This marine species occurs off the Fiji Islands.
