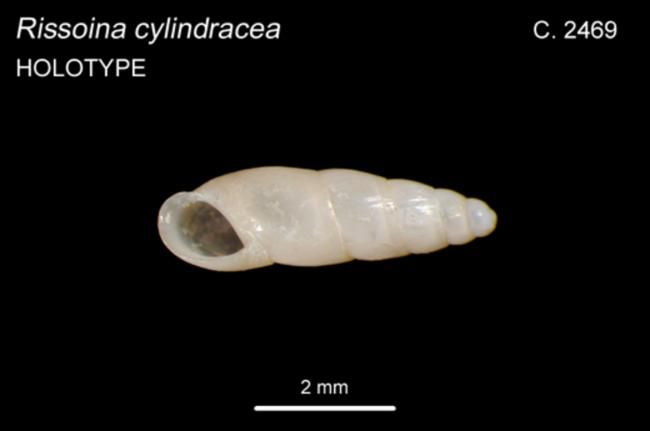
- Epigrus cylindraceus (Tenison Woods, 1878) - Australia, New South Wales

Scientific classification
- Kingdom: Animalia
- Phylum: Mollusca
- Class: Gastropoda
- Subclass: Caenogastropoda
- Order: Littorinimorpha
- Superfamily: Truncatelloidea
- Family: Epigridae; W.F. Ponder, 1985

Genera
- See text

= Epigridae =

Family of gastropods

Epigridae is a family of very small sea snails, marine gastropod molluscs in the superfamily Truncatelloidea, and clade Littorinimorpha.

== Taxonomy ==
Genera within the family Epigridae include:

- Genus Epigrus C. Hedley, 1903 - the type genus
