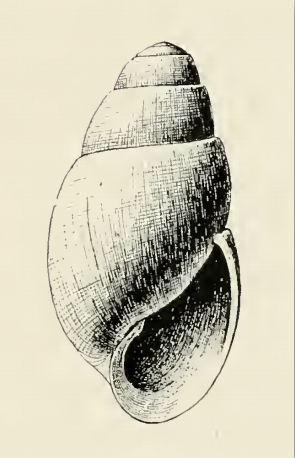
- Aartsenia arctica shell

Scientific classification
- Kingdom: Animalia
- Phylum: Mollusca
- Class: Gastropoda
- Family: Pyramidellidae
- Genus: Aartsenia; Warén, 1991

Type species
- Amaura candida (Møller, 1842)

Synonyms
- Amaura Møller, 1842

= Aartsenia =

Genus of gastropods

Aartsenia is a genus of sea snails, marine gastropod mollusks in the family Pyramidellidae, the pyrams and their allies.

== Description ==
The species in this genus are very large compared to the Odostomias, looking like inflated Odostomias. Their sculpture consists of very fine lines of growth and still finer wavy closely placed spiral striations.

== Distribution ==
The vast majority of the genus's distribution is in the Northern Sea near the coasts of Iceland and Scandinavian countries such as Norway, Sweden and Denmark, near the Arctic Circle.

== Species ==
Species within the genus Aartsenia include:

- Aartsenia arctica (Dall & Bartsch, 1909)
- Aartsenia candida (Møller, 1842)
- Aartsenia canfieldi (Hendy, 2021)
- Aartsenia gouldi (Hendy, 2021)
- Aartsenia japonica (A. Adams, 1860)
- Aartsenia martensi (Dall & Bartsch, 1906)
- Aartsenia nuciformis (Hendy, 2021)
- Aartsenia pupiformis (P. P. Carpenter, 1865)
- Aartsenia sagamiensis (Kuroda & Habe, 1971)
- Aartsenia sanesia (Hendy, 2021)
- Aartsenia sasagensis (Nomura, 1939)
- Aartsenia satura (Hendy, 2020)
- Aartsenia sikisimana (Nomura, 1939)
- Aartsenia stearnsii (Hendy, 2021)
- Aartsenia timessa (Hendy, 2021)
