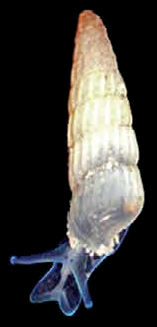
- Live Turbonilla acutissima
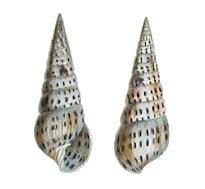
- Apertural view of a shell of Pyramidella acus

Scientific classification
- Kingdom: Animalia
- Phylum: Mollusca
- Class: Gastropoda
- Superfamily: Pyramidelloidea
- Family: Pyramidellidae; J. E. Gray, 1840

Type genus
- Pyramidella Lamarck, 1799

Synonyms
- Chemnitziidae; Heterostropha

= Pyramidellidae =

Family of sea snails

Pyramidellidae, common name the pyram family, or pyramid shells, is a voluminous taxonomic family of mostly small and minute ectoparasitic sea snails, marine heterobranch gastropod molluscs. The great majority of species of pyrams are micromolluscs.

The pyram family is distributed worldwide with more than 6,000 named species in more than 350 nominal genera and subgenera.

This family of micromolluscs has been little studied and the phylogenetic relationships within the family are not well worked out. There is an absence of a general consensus regarding which species belong to a specific genus or subgenus, contributing to much confusion. Schander (1999) names more than 300 supraspecific names. As there has been no serious generic revision of the genera worldwide, generic polyphyly can be expected to be rampant throughout the family. However, the family itself is deemed monophyletic. However a study in 2011 seems to indicate that this family is deeply nested within the Pulmonata instead of the Heterobranchia.

The family is currently divided into 11 subfamilies (Ponder & Lindberg 1997). An alternative interpretation is that the family Pyramidellidae is but one of six families within the superfamily Pyramidelloidea (Schander, van Aartsen & Corgan 1999). Many species are rare or infrequently recorded.

== Subfamilies ==
Subfamilies included within the family Pyramidellidae vary according to the taxonomy consulted. The currently leading taxonomy is the taxonomy of Bouchet & Rocroi (2005).

=== 1997 taxonomy ===
Taxonomy of Pyramidellidae by Ponder & Lindberg (1997):

- Chrysallidinae Saurin, 1958
- Cingulininae Saurin, 1959
- Cyclostremellinae Moore, 1966
- Eulimellinae Saurin, 1958
- Odostomellinae Saurin, 1959
- Odostomiinae Pelseneer, 1928
- Pyramidellinae J.E. Gray, 1840
- Sayellinae Wise, 1996
- Syrnolinae Saurin, 1958
- Tiberiinae Saurin, 1958
- Turbonillinae Bronn, 1849

=== 1999 taxonomy ===
Taxonomy of Pyramidellidae by Schander, Van Aartsen & Corgan (1999):

- Superfamily Pyramidelloidea Gray, 1840
  - Family Amathinidae Ponder, 1987
  - Family Ebalidae Warén, 1994 - synonym: Anisocyclidae van Aartsen, 1995
  - Family Odostomiidae Pelseneer, 1928
    - Subfamily Odostomiinae Pelseneer, 1928
    - Subfamily Chrysallidinae Saurin, 1958
    - Subfamily Odostomellinae Saurin, 1958
    - Subfamily Cyclostremellinae Moore, 1966
  - Family Pyramidellidae J. E. Gray, 1840
    - Subfamily Pyramidellinae J. E. Gray, 1840
    - Subfamily Sayellinae Wise, 1996
  - Family Syrnolidae Saurin, 1958
    - Subfamily Syrnolinae Saurin, 1958
    - Subfamily Tiberiinae Saurin, 1958
  - Family Turbonillidae Bronn, 1849
    - Subfamily Turbonillinae Bronn, 1849
    - Subfamily Eulimellinae Saurin, 1958
    - Subfamily Cingulininae Saurin, 1959

=== 2005 taxonomy ===
Taxonomy of Pyramidellidae by Bouchet & Rocroi (2005):

- Subfamily Pyramidellinae Gray, 1840
  - Tribe Pyramidellini Gray, 1840 - synonyms: Obeliscidae A. Adams, 1863 (inv.); Plotiidae Focart, 1951 (inv.)
  - Tribe Sayellini Wise, 1996 - formerly subfamily Sayellinae
- Subfamily Odostomiinae Pelseneer, 1928
  - Tribe Odostomiini Pelseneer, 1928 - synonyms: Ptychostomonidae Locard, 1886; Liostomiini Schander, Halanych, Dahlgren & Sundberg, 2003 (n.a.)
  - Tribe Chrysallidini Saurin, 1958 - formerly subfamily Chrysallidinae, synonyms: Menesthinae Saurin, 1958; Pyrgulininae Saurin, 1959
  - Tribe Cyclostremellini D. R. Moore, 1966 - formerly subfamily Cyclostremellinae
  - Tribe Odostomellini Saurin, 1959 - formerly subfamily Odostomellinae
- Subfamily Syrnolinae Saurin, 1958 - formerly subfamily Syrnolinae
  - Tribe Syrnolini Saurin, 1958
  - Tribe Tiberiini Saurin, 1958 - formerly subfamily Tiberiinae
- Subfamily Turbonillinae Bronn, 1849
  - Tribe Turbonillini Bronn, 1849 - synonym: Chemnitziinae Stoliczka, 1868
  - Tribe Cingulinini Saurin, 1958 - formerly subfamily Cingulininae
  - Tribe Eulimellini Saurin, 1958 - formerly subfamily Eulimellinae
- Pyramidellidae incertae sedis
  - Bulimoscilla Robba, 2013
  - Maricarmenia Peñas & Rolán, 2017
  - Pyrabinella Faber, 2013
  - Pyramidellidae incertae sedis insularis Oliver, 1915

In 2010 the family Pyramidellidae has been recognized as monophyletic

In 2017 the genera Helodiamea Peñas & Rolán, 2017 of deep-water Pyramidelloidea from the Central and South Pacific, and the Perheida Peñas & Rolán, 2017 were recognized.

== Problematic taxa ==
The following genera are currently difficult to place within existing subtaxa of the Pyramidellidae.

- Charilda Iredale, 1929
- Contraxiala Laseron, 1956
- Cossmannica Dall & Bartsch, 1904
- Eulimotibera Nomura, 1939
- Finlayola Laws, 1937
- Morrisonetta Brandt, 1968
- Peristichia Dall, 1889
- Ulfa Dall & Bartsch, 1904
- Vagna Dall & Bartsch, 1904

The following species is of uncertain placement within Pyramidellidae.

- "Epigrus" insularis Oliver, 1915
- Pyramidellidae incertae sedis venusta (de Folin, 1872)

== Synonyms ==
The following genera have become synonyms (but some species in this genera have not yet been reassigned) :

- Actaeopyramis P. Fischer, 1885: synonym of Monotigma G.B. Sowerby II, 1839
- Amaura Møller, 1842: synonym of Aartsenia Warén, 1991
- Auriculina Gray, 1847: synonym of Ondina de Folin, 1870
- Besla Dall & Bartsch, 1904: synonym of Parthenina Bucquoy, Dautzenberg & Dollfus, 1883
- Brachystomia Monterosato, 1884: synonym of Odostomia Fleming, 1813
- Chemnitzia d'Orbigny, 1839: synonym of Turbonilla Risso, 1826
- Elusa A. Adams, 1861: synonym of Tropaeas Dall & Bartsch, 1904
- Folinella Dall & Bartsch, 1904: synonym of Chrysallida Carpenter, 1856
- Iole A. Adams, 1860: synonym of Iolaea A. Adams, 1867
- Iolina Baily, 1948: synonym of Iolaea A. Adams, 1867
- Ividella Dall & Bartsch, 1909: synonym of Chrysallida Carpenter, 1856
- Lonchaeus : synonym of Longchaeus Mörch, 1875
- Moerchiella Thiele, 1924 : synonym of Moerchia A. Adams, 1860
- Moerchinella Thiele, 1931: synonym of Moerchia A. Adams, 1860
- Monoptygma: synonym of Monotigma G.B. Sowerby II, 1839
- Monotygma G.B. Sowerby II, 1839: synonym of Monotigma G.B. Sowerby II, 1839
- Noemia de Folin, 1870: synonym of Noemiamea de Folin, 1886
- Obeliscus Gray, 1847: synonym of Pyramidella Lamarck, 1799
- Obex Laws, 1940: synonym of Obexomia Laws, 1941
- Odontostoma Philippi, 1853: synonym of Odostomia Fleming, 1813
- Odontostomia G.B. Sowerby I, 1839: synonym of Odostomia Fleming, 1813
- Parthenia Lowe, 1840: synonym of Parthenina Bucquoy, Dautzenberg & Dollfus, 1883
- Parthenina Bucquoy, Dautzenberg & Dollfus, 1883: synonym of Chrysallida Carpenter, 1856
- Partulida Schaufuss, 1869: synonym of Chrysallida Carpenter, 1856
- Planipyrgiscus [sic]: synonym of Planpyrgiscus Laws, 1937
- Plotia Röding, 1798: synonym of Pyramidella Lamarck, 1799
- Ptychostomon Locard, 1886: synonym of Odostomia Fleming, 1813
- Pyrgulina A. Adams, 1864: synonym of Chrysallida Carpenter, 1856
- Raoulostraca Oliver, 1915: synonym of Eulimella Forbes & M'Andrew, 1846
- Tragula Monterosato, 1884: synonym of Chrysallida Carpenter, 1856
- Tropeas [sic]: synonym of Tropaeas Dall & Bartsch, 1904

== Distribution ==
This family is found worldwide, but many species are only found in relatively small geographical ranges. The species found at the Cape Verdes are mainly endemic species.

== Shell description ==
The length of the slender, elongated (turreted or conical) shells varies between 0.5 mm and 3.5 cm, but most species in the family have shells which are smaller than 13 mm.

The texture of these shells is smooth or sculptured in various forms such as ribs and spirals. Their color is mostly white, cream or yellowish, sometimes with red or brown lines.

The shell of these snails has a blunt, heterostrophic (i.e. whorls appear to be coiled in the opposite direction to those of the teleoconch) protoconch, which is often pointed sideways or wrapped up. The teleoconch is dextrally coiled, but the larval shells are sinistral. This results in a sinistrally coiled protoconch.

The columella has usually one, but sometimes several, spiral folds. The aperture is closed by an oligogyrous operculum.

The operculum is ovoid and paucispiral, with the apex anterior, a thread-like arcuate ridge on the proximal side, the inner margin notched in harmony with the plaits of the pillar when prominent.

The species are characterized by the lack of jaw or radula, because they are ectoparasites (mostly on polychaetes or other molluscs).

== Life habits ==
The Pyramidellidae are ectoparasites, feeding mainly on other molluscs and on annelid worms, but some are known to feed on peanut worms and crustaceans. A few species in the family Pyramidellidae, such as Otopleura mitralis, are symbiotic with sea anemones, such as Neoaiptasia morbilla.

They do not have a radula. Instead their long proboscis is used to pierce the skin of its prey and suck up its fluids and soft tissues. The eyes on the grooved tentacles are situated toward the base of the tentacles. These tentacles have a concave surface. Between the head and the propodium (the foremost division of the foot), a lobed process called the mentum (= thin projection) is visible. This mentum is slightly indented in midline.

These gastropods are hermaphrodites, laying eggs in jelly-like masses on the shell of their hosts. Some species have spermatophores.

== Name derived from shape ==
The name of this taxonomic family comes from the shape of the shell, which is like a pyramid. More specifically, the shape is like a right circular cone, which is equivalent to a right pyramid whose base has many sides.
