= Cerithium rueppelli =

Scientific classification
- Kingdom: Animalia
- Phylum: Mollusca
- Class: Gastropoda
- Subclass: Caenogastropoda
- Order: incertae sedis
- Family: Cerithiidae
- Genus: Cerithium
- Species: C. rueppelli

Binomial name
- Cerithium rueppelli Philippi, 1848

Synonyms
- Cerithium ruppelli Philippi, 1848; Cerithium rüppelli Philippi, 1848; Cerithium savignyi P. Fischer, 1865; Cerithium spathuliferum G.B. Sowerby II, 1855

Species of gastropod

Cerithium rueppelli is a species of sea snail, a marine gastropod mollusk in the family Cerithiidae.

== Distribution ==
The distribution of Cerithium rueppelli includes the Western Indian Ocean.
