= Cerithium egenum =

Scientific classification
- Kingdom: Animalia
- Phylum: Mollusca
- Class: Gastropoda
- Subclass: Caenogastropoda
- Order: incertae sedis
- Family: Cerithiidae
- Genus: Cerithium
- Species: C. egenum

Binomial name
- Cerithium egenum Gould, 1849

Synonyms
- Cerithium (Cerithium) egenum Gould, 1849; Cerithium (Conocerithium) bavayi Vignal, 1902; Cerithium (Thericium) egenum Gould, 1849; Cerithium bavayi Vignal, 1902; Cerithium bavayi var. denticulata Vignal, 1902; Cerithium rarimaculatum G.B. Sowerby II, 1855; Cerithium strictum Hedley, 1899

Species of gastropod

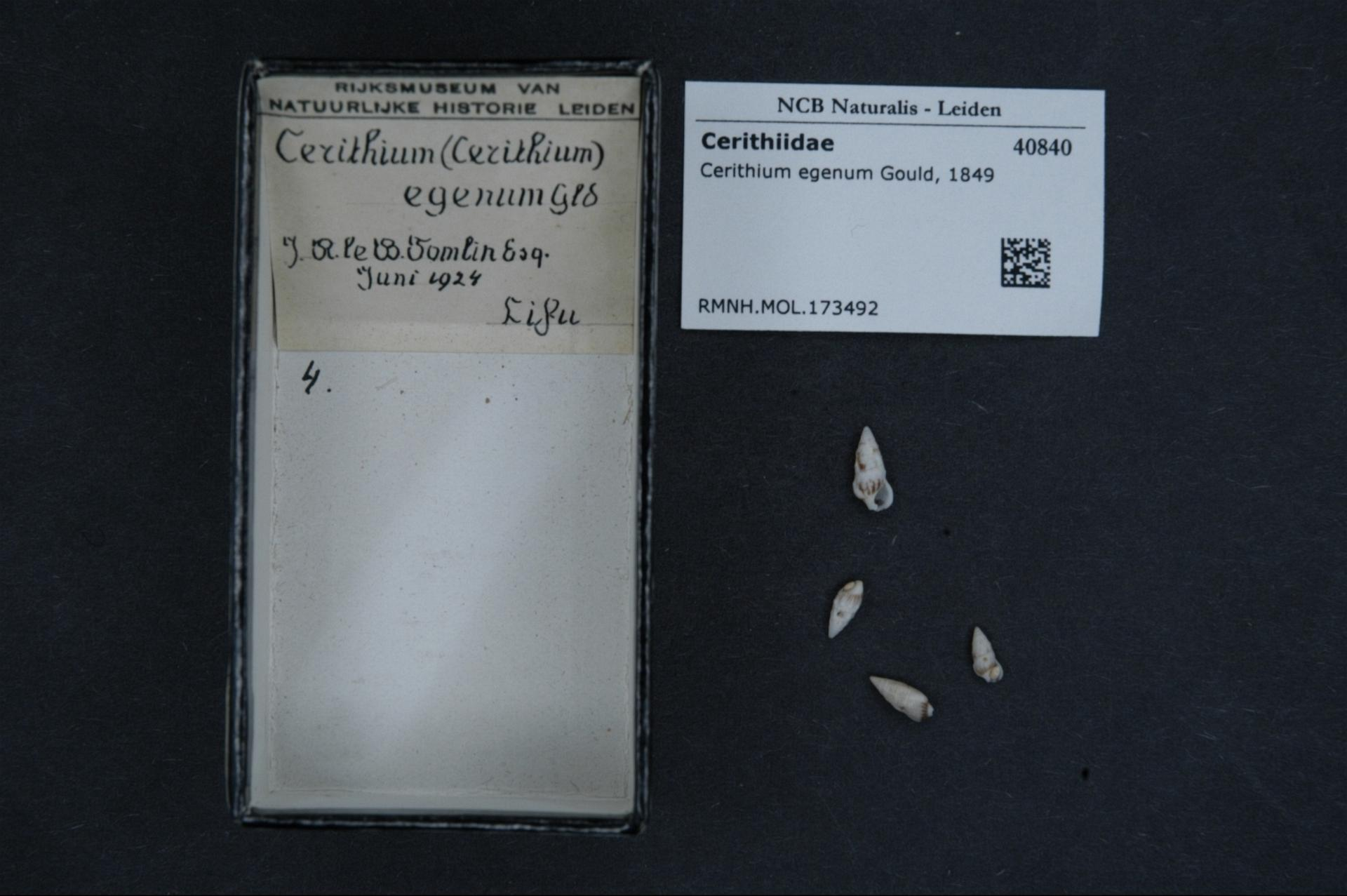
Cerithium egenum specimens

Cerithium egenum is a species of sea snail, a marine gastropod mollusk in the family Cerithiidae.

== Distribution ==
The distribution of Cerithium egenum includes the Western Central Pacific.

- Indonesia
- Guam
