= Cerithium leptocharactum =

Scientific classification
- Kingdom: Animalia
- Phylum: Mollusca
- Class: Gastropoda
- Subclass: Caenogastropoda
- Order: incertae sedis
- Family: Cerithiidae
- Genus: Cerithium
- Species: C. leptocharactum

Binomial name
- Cerithium leptocharactum (Rehder, 1980)

Synonyms
- Cerithium (Thericium) leptocharactum Rehder, 1980

Species of gastropod

Cerithium leptocharactum is a species of sea snail, a marine gastropod mollusk belonging to the family Cerithiidae.
