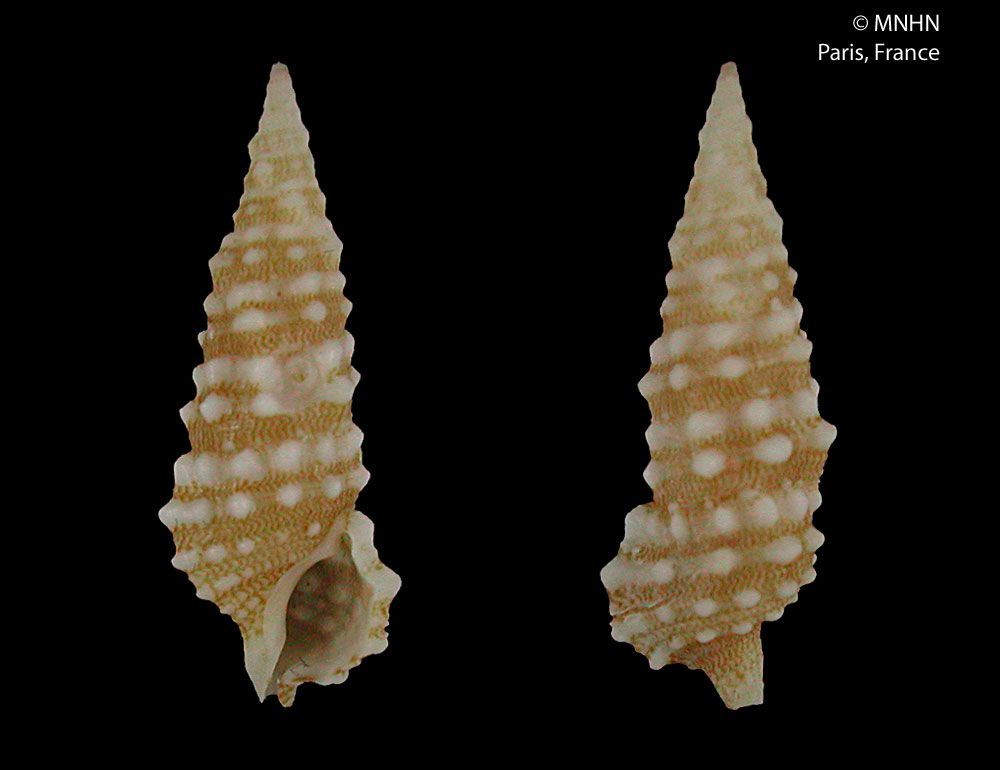
- Cerithium balletoni

Scientific classification
- Kingdom: Animalia
- Phylum: Mollusca
- Class: Gastropoda
- Subclass: Caenogastropoda
- Order: incertae sedis
- Family: Cerithiidae
- Genus: Cerithium
- Species: C. balletoni

Binomial name
- Cerithium balletoni Cecalupo, 2009

= Cerithium balletoni =

Species of gastropod

Cerithium balletoni is a species of sea snail, a marine gastropod mollusc in the family Cerithiidae.
