= Cerithium atromarginatum =

- Cerithium atromarginatum shell

Scientific classification
- Kingdom: Animalia
- Phylum: Mollusca
- Class: Gastropoda
- Subclass: Caenogastropoda
- Order: incertae sedis
- Family: Cerithiidae
- Genus: Cerithium
- Species: C. atromarginatum

Binomial name
- Cerithium atromarginatum Dautzenberg & Bouge, 1933

Synonyms
- Cerithium (Conocerithium) atromarginatum Dautzenberg & Bouge, 1933; Cerithium (Thericium) atromarginatum Dautzenberg & Bouge, 1933; Cerithium maculosum Mighels, 1845; Cerithium nassoides G.B. Sowerby II, 1855; Cerithium nassoides var. minor Couturier, 1907

Species of gastropod

Cerithium atromarginatum is a species of sea snail, a marine gastropod mollusk in the family Cerithiidae.

== Distribution ==
The distribution of Cerithium atromarginatum includes the Pacific Ocean.
