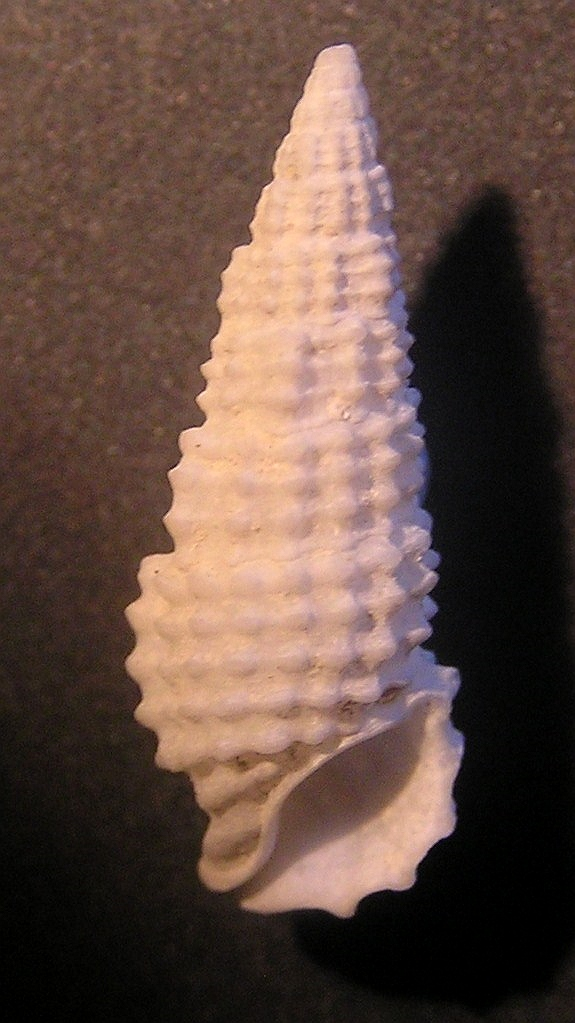

Scientific classification
- Kingdom: Animalia
- Phylum: Mollusca
- Class: Gastropoda
- Subclass: Caenogastropoda
- Order: incertae sedis
- Family: Cerithiidae
- Genus: Cerithium
- Species: C. scobiniforme

Binomial name
- Cerithium scobiniforme Houbrick, 1992

= Cerithium scobiniforme =

Species of gastropod

Cerithium scobiniforme is a species of sea snail, a marine gastropod mollusk in the family Cerithiidae.

== Distribution ==
The distribution of Cerithium scobiniforme includes the Western Central Pacific.

- Philippines

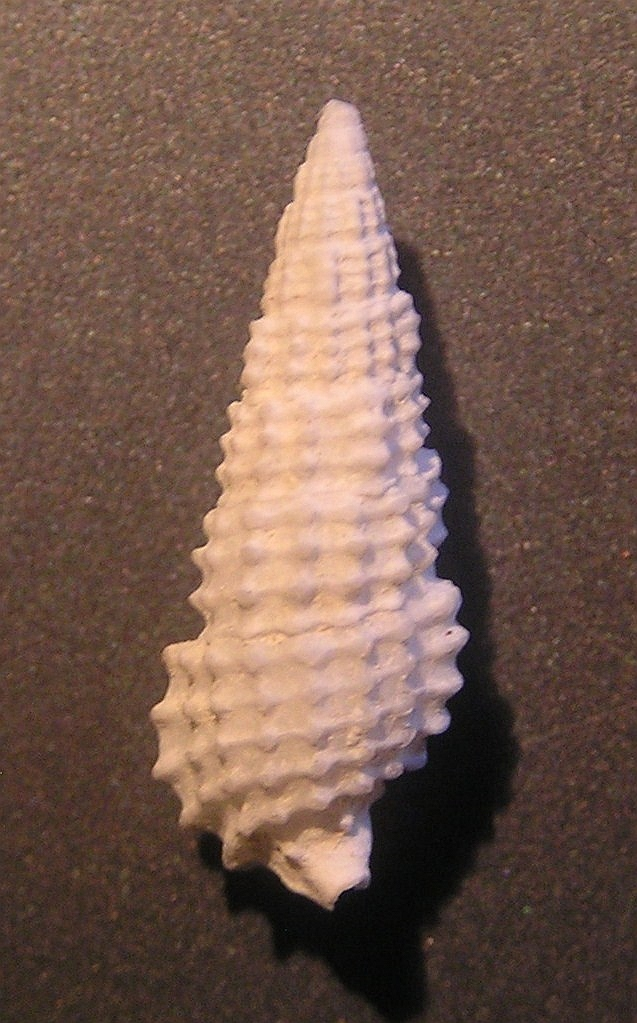
Cerithium scobiniforme, abapertural view
