= Cerithium tuberculatum =

Scientific classification
- Kingdom: Animalia
- Phylum: Mollusca
- Class: Gastropoda
- Subclass: Caenogastropoda
- Order: incertae sedis
- Family: Cerithiidae
- Genus: Cerithium
- Species: C. tuberculatum

Binomial name
- Cerithium tuberculatum (Linnaeus, 1767)

Synonyms
- Clypeomorus tuberculatus (Linnaeus, 1767)

Species of gastropod

Cerithium tuberculatum is a species of sea snail, a marine gastropod mollusk in the family Cerithiidae.
