= Cerithium lissum =

Scientific classification
- Kingdom: Animalia
- Phylum: Mollusca
- Class: Gastropoda
- Subclass: Caenogastropoda
- Order: incertae sedis
- Family: Cerithiidae
- Genus: Cerithium
- Species: C. lissum

Binomial name
- Cerithium lissum (Watson, 1880)

Synonyms
- Cerithium (Bittium) lissum Watson, 1880; Cerithium veillardi Drivas & Jay, 1990

Species of gastropod

Cerithium lissum is a species of sea snail, a marine gastropod mollusk in the family Cerithiidae.

== Distribution ==
The distribution of Cerithium lissum includes the Western Central Pacific.

- Philippines
