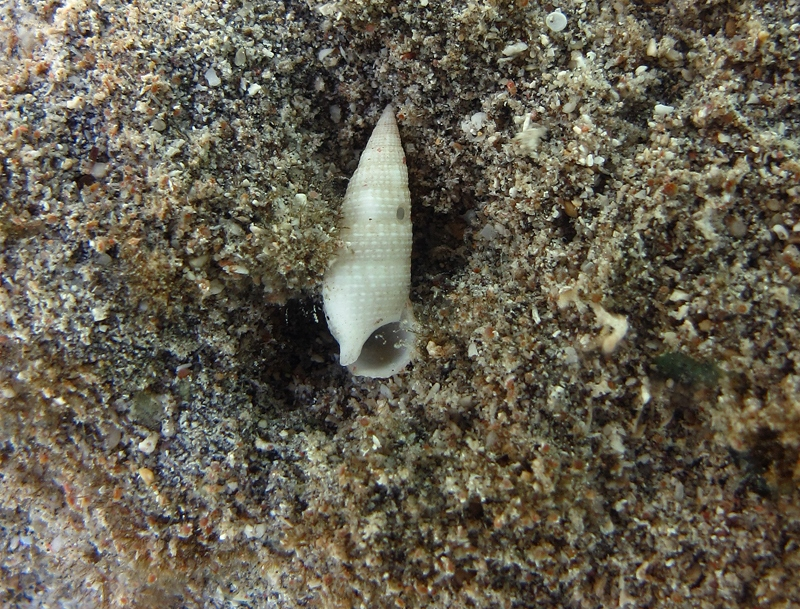

Scientific classification
- Kingdom: Animalia
- Phylum: Mollusca
- Class: Gastropoda
- Subclass: Caenogastropoda
- Order: incertae sedis
- Family: Cerithiidae
- Genus: Cerithium
- Species: C. nesioticum

Binomial name
- Cerithium nesioticum Pilsbry & Vanatta, 1906

Synonyms
- Cerithium (Liocerithium) lacteum Kiener, 1842; Cerithium (Liocerithium) nesioticum Pilsbry & Vanatta, 1906; Cerithium (Semivertagus) lacteum Kiener, 1842; Cerithium (Semivertagus) nesioticum Pilsbry & Vanatta, 1906; Cerithium collacteum Iredale, 1929; Cerithium lacteum Kiener, 1842; Cerithium papillosum G.B. Sowerby II, 1855; Cerithium pusillum Jay, 1850; Cerithium spiculum Hedley, 1899; Cerithium voyi Pilsbry & Vanatta, 1905; Lampania lactea (Kiener, 1842)

= Cerithium nesioticum =

Species of gastropod

Cerithium nesioticum is a species of sea snail, a marine gastropod mollusc in the family Cerithiidae.

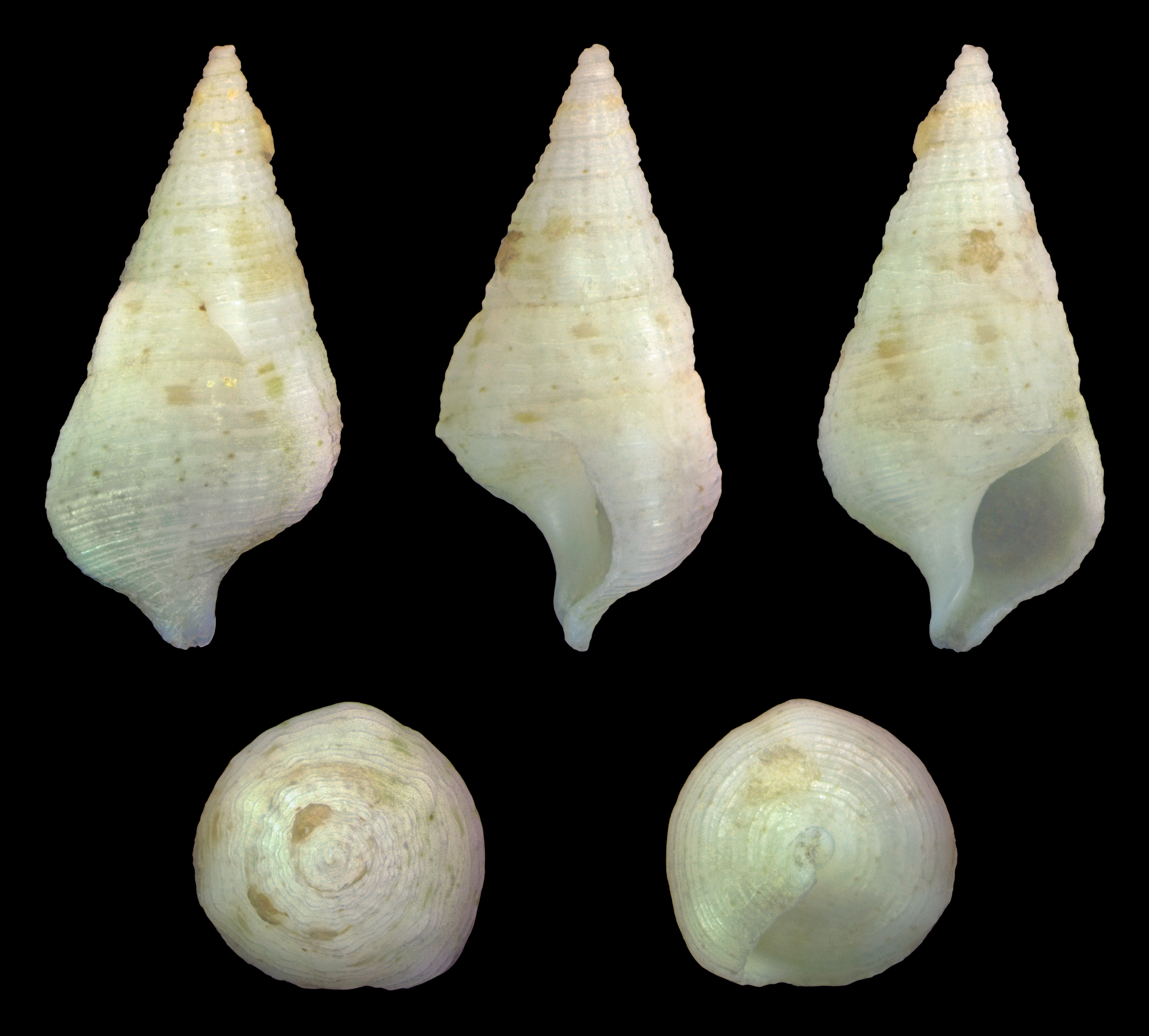
Juvenile

== Distribution ==
The distribution of Cerithium nesioticum includes the Pacific Ocean.
