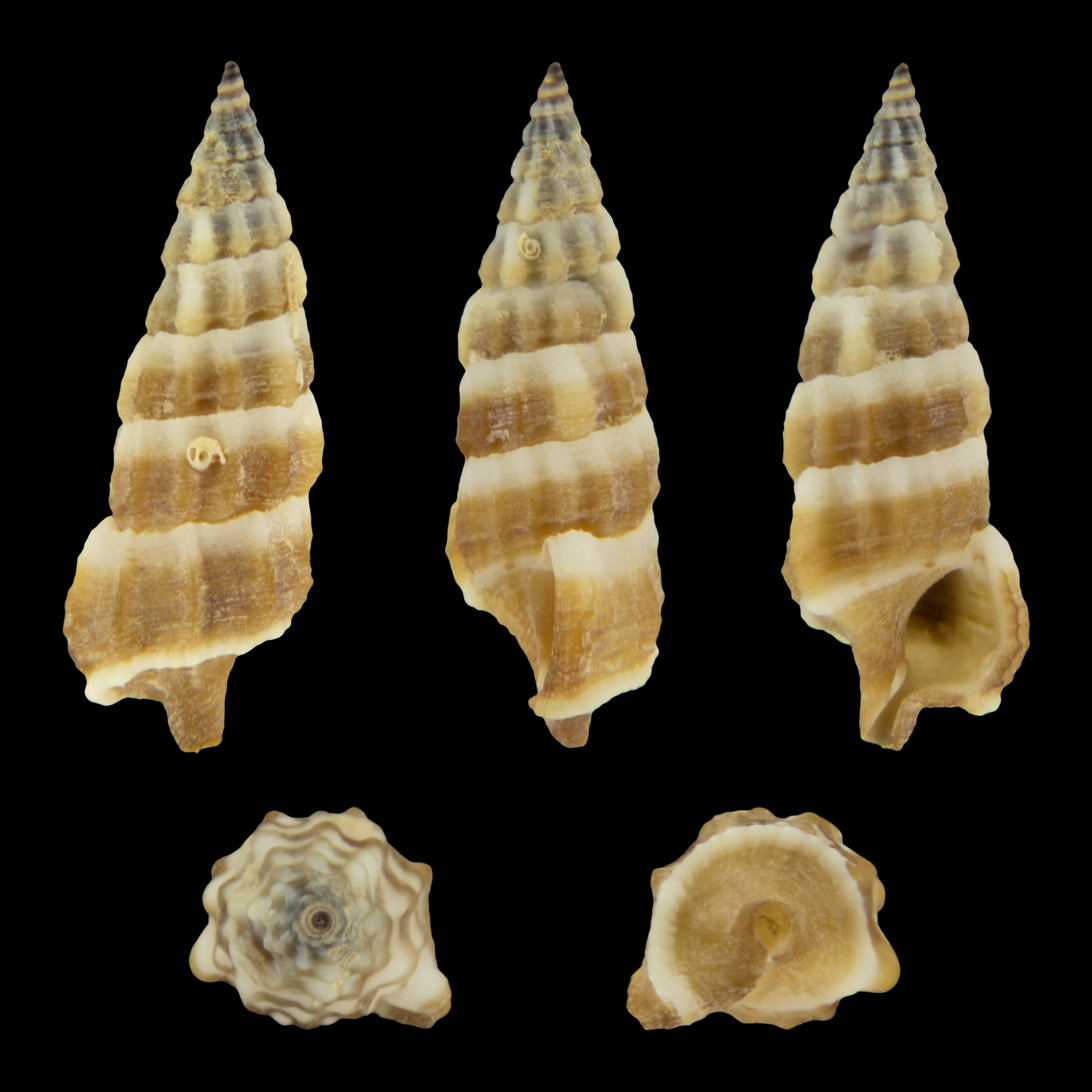

Scientific classification
- Kingdom: Animalia
- Phylum: Mollusca
- Class: Gastropoda
- Subclass: Caenogastropoda
- Order: incertae sedis
- Family: Cerithiidae
- Genus: Cerithium
- Species: C. balteatum

Binomial name
- Cerithium balteatum Philippi, 1848

Synonyms
- Cerithium coronatum G.B. Sowerby II, 1855; Cerithium custos Bayle, 1880; Cerithium invaginatum Gould, 1849; Cerithium nigrobalteatum E.A. Smith, 1884; Cerithium planiusculum Kobelt, 1895; Cerithium schmidti Ladd, 1972

= Cerithium balteatum =

Species of gastropod

Cerithium balteatum is a species of sea snail, a marine gastropod mollusk in the family Cerithiidae.

== Distribution ==
The distribution of Cerithium balteatum includes the western Central Pacific.

- Philippines
- Indonesia
- Guam
