= Cerithium lindae =

Scientific classification
- Kingdom: Animalia
- Phylum: Mollusca
- Class: Gastropoda
- Subclass: Caenogastropoda
- Order: incertae sedis
- Family: Cerithiidae
- Genus: Cerithium
- Species: C. lindae

Binomial name
- Cerithium lindae Petuch, 1987

Species of gastropod

Cerithium lindae is a species of sea snail, a marine gastropod mollusk in the family Cerithiidae.

== Distribution ==
Locus typicus: "Peanut Island, Palm Beach Inlet of Lake Worth, West Palm Beach, Florida, USA."

== Description ==
Original description: "Shell small for genus, very elongated, with rounded whorls; whorls without varices, circular in cross-section; cylindrical in shape, siphonal canal short, open, barely developed; outer lip flaring, thickened, producing single varix (on adult specimens); aperture round; body whorl sculptured with 9-12 large beaded cords; subsutural beaded cord often largest, separated from other body whorl cords by narrow gap without sculpturing; shell color grayish-white with beads on spiral cords being black; inner edge of lip with evenly-spaced black dots; cords often with one white bead between two black beads, producing a tessellated appearance; interior of aperture white."

The maximum recorded shell length is 11 mm.

== Habitat ==
Minimum recorded depth is 0 m. Maximum recorded depth is 0 m.
