= Cerithium salebrosum =

Scientific classification
- Kingdom: Animalia
- Phylum: Mollusca
- Class: Gastropoda
- Subclass: Caenogastropoda
- Order: incertae sedis
- Family: Cerithiidae
- Genus: Cerithium
- Species: C. salebrosum

Binomial name
- Cerithium salebrosum G.B. Sowerby II, 1855

Species of gastropod

Cerithium salebrosum is a species of sea snail, a marine gastropod mollusk in the family Cerithiidae.

== Description ==
Cerithium salebrosum has a spiraling conical shell that can be colored white, gray, black, or brown.

== Distribution ==
The distribution of Cerithium salebrosum includes the Western Central Pacific.

- Indonesia
- Guam
