= Cerithium buzzurroi =

Scientific classification
- Kingdom: Animalia
- Phylum: Mollusca
- Class: Gastropoda
- Subclass: Caenogastropoda
- Order: incertae sedis
- Family: Cerithiidae
- Genus: Cerithium
- Species: C. buzzurroi

Binomial name
- Cerithium buzzurroi Cecalupo, 2005

Species of gastropod

Cerithium buzzurroi is a species of sea snail, a marine gastropod mollusk in the family Cerithiidae.

== Distribution ==
The distribution of Cerithium buzzurroi includes the Western Central Pacific.

- Philippines
