= Cerithium torresi =

Scientific classification
- Kingdom: Animalia
- Phylum: Mollusca
- Class: Gastropoda
- Subclass: Caenogastropoda
- Order: incertae sedis
- Family: Cerithiidae
- Genus: Cerithium
- Species: C. torresi

Binomial name
- Cerithium torresi Smith, 1884

Species of gastropod

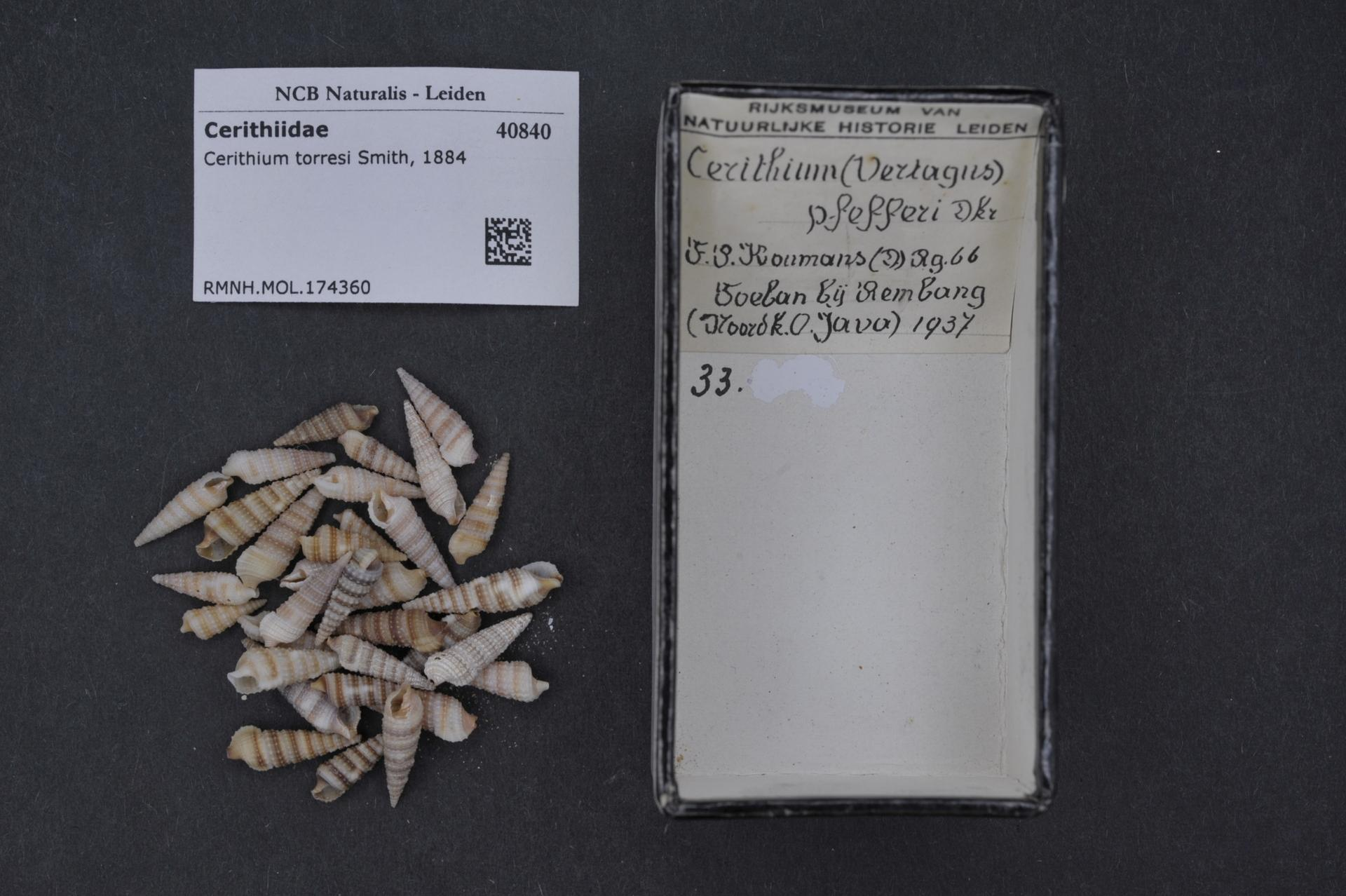

Cerithium torresi is a species of sea snail, a marine gastropod mollusk in the family Cerithiidae.
