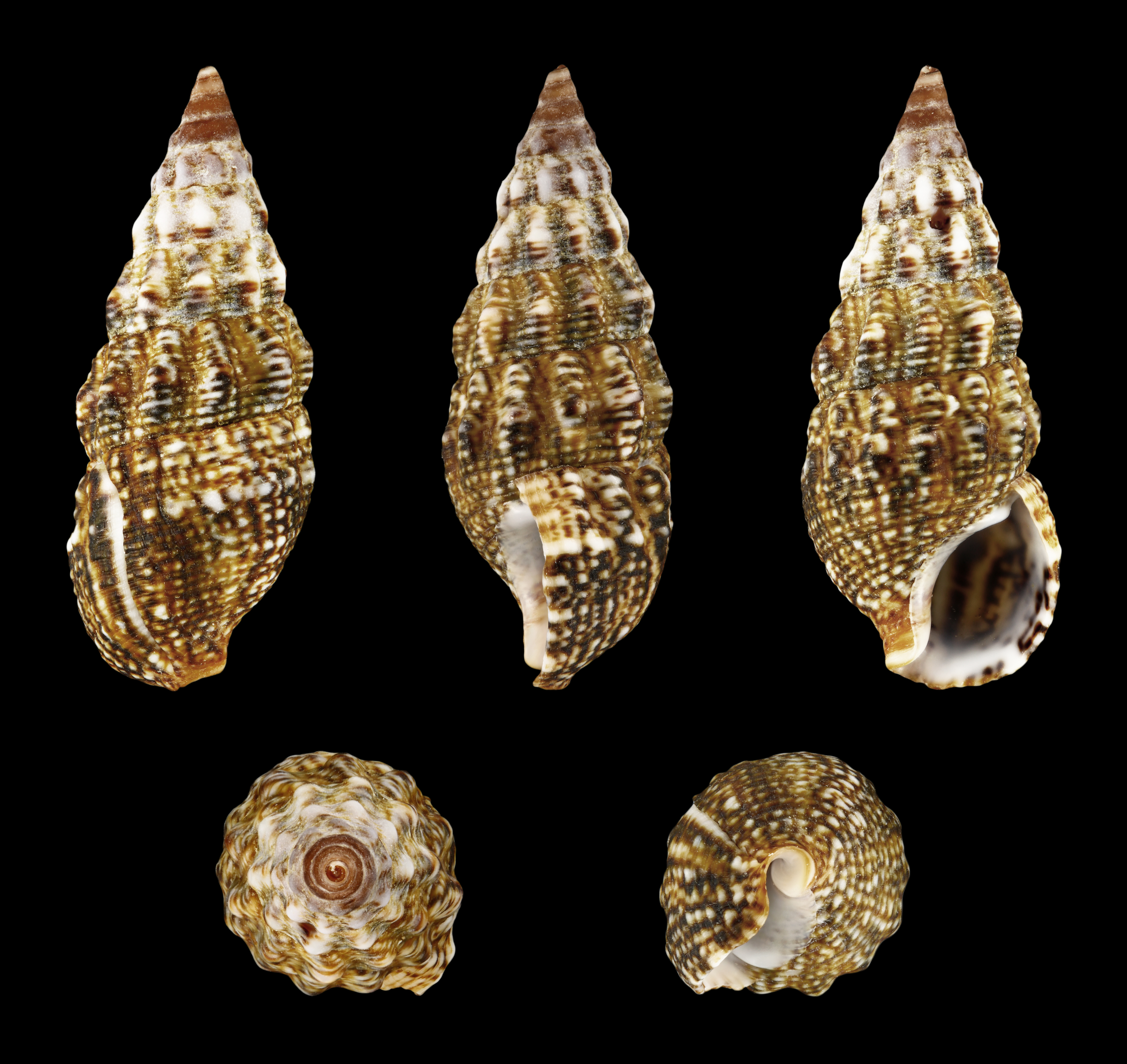

Scientific classification
- Kingdom: Animalia
- Phylum: Mollusca
- Class: Gastropoda
- Subclass: Caenogastropoda
- Order: incertae sedis
- Family: Cerithiidae
- Genus: Cerithium
- Species: C. lividulum

Binomial name
- Cerithium lividulum Risso, 1826

Synonyms
- Cerithium lividulum var. nodulosa Pallary, 1900; Cerithium massiliense Locard, 1886; Cerithium mediterraneum Deshayes, 1843; Cerithium mediterraneum var. archipelagica Pallary, 1912; Cerithium mediterraneum var. syriaca Pallary, 1919; Cerithium palustre Locard & Caziot, 1900; Cerithium palustre var. elongata Locard & Caziot, 1900; Cerithium pictum Anton, 1838; Cerithium requieni Locard & Caziot, 1900; Cerithium rupestre var. minor Bucquoy, Dautzenberg & Dollfus, 1884; Cerithium rupestre var. plicata Bucquoy, Dautzenberg & Dollfus, 1884; Cerithium strumaticum Locard, 1886; Cerithium syriacum Pallary, 1919 (dubious synonym); Cerithium syriacum var. strigosa Pallary, 1938 (dubious synonym); Cerithium tingitanum Pallary, 1920 (dubious synonym); Hirtocerithium fartulum Monterosato, 1923 (dubious synonym); Lithocerithium bellicosum Monterosato, 1917 (dubious synonym)

= Cerithium lividulum =

Species of gastropod

Cerithium lividulum is a species of sea snail, a marine gastropod mollusk in the family Cerithiidae.

== Distribution ==
This species occurs in the Mediterranean Sea.
