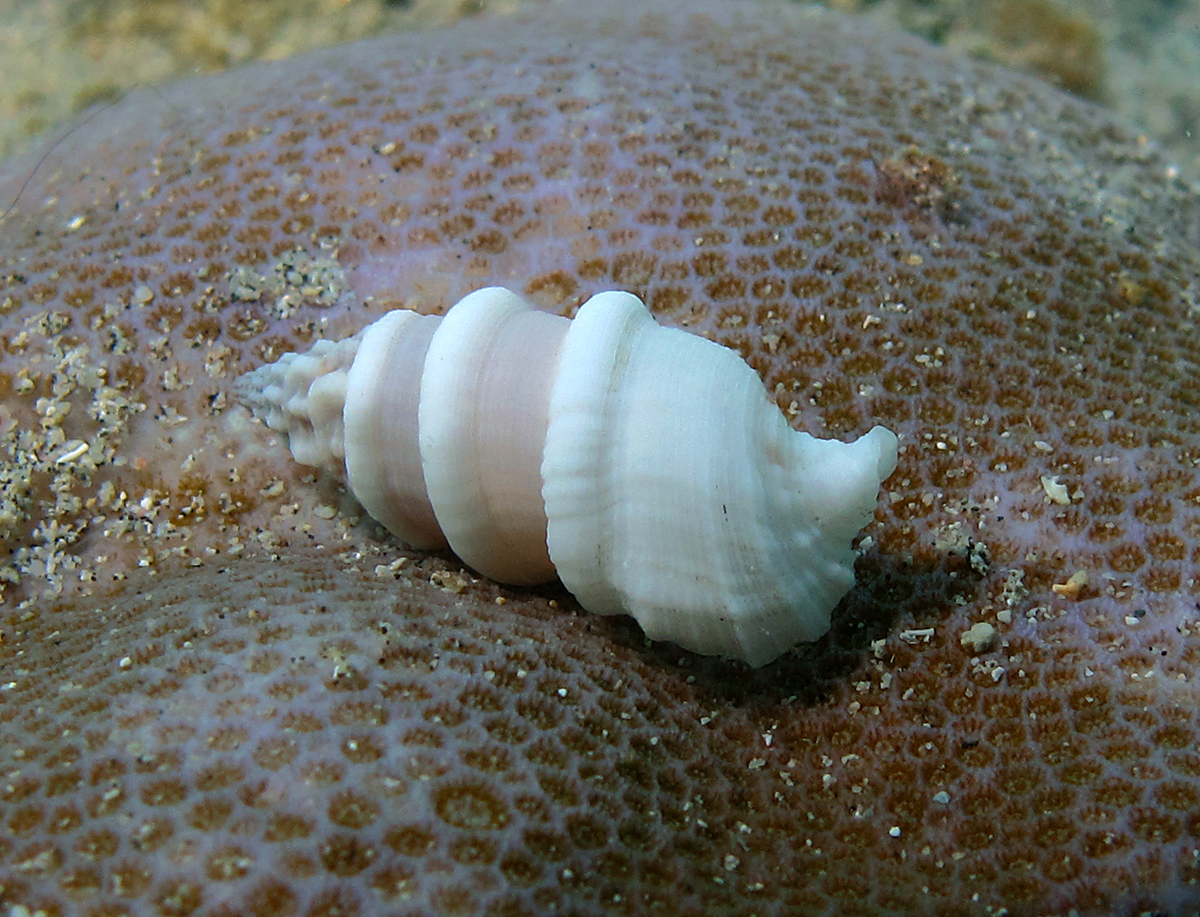
- Cerithium torulosum shell

Scientific classification
- Kingdom: Animalia
- Phylum: Mollusca
- Class: Gastropoda
- Subclass: Caenogastropoda
- Order: incertae sedis
- Family: Cerithiidae
- Genus: Cerithium
- Species: C. torulosum

Binomial name
- Cerithium torulosum (Linnaeus, 1767)

Synonyms
- Vertagus torulosus (Linnaeus, 1767)

= Cerithium torulosum =

Species of gastropod

Cerithium torulosum is a species of sea snail, a marine gastropod mollusk in the family Cerithiidae.

== Distribution ==
The distribution of Cerithium torulosum includes the Eastern Central Pacific.
