= Cerithium rehderi =

Scientific classification
- Kingdom: Animalia
- Phylum: Mollusca
- Class: Gastropoda
- Subclass: Caenogastropoda
- Order: incertae sedis
- Family: Cerithiidae
- Genus: Cerithium
- Species: C. rehderi

Binomial name
- Cerithium rehderi Houbrick, 1992

Species of gastropod

Cerithium rehderi is a species of sea snail, a marine gastropod mollusk in the family Cerithiidae. They are found near the Marquesas Islands in French Polynesia.
