= Cerithium claviforme =

Scientific classification
- Kingdom: Animalia
- Phylum: Mollusca
- Class: Gastropoda
- Subclass: Caenogastropoda
- Order: incertae sedis
- Family: Cerithiidae
- Genus: Cerithium
- Species: C. claviforme

Binomial name
- Cerithium claviforme Schepman, 1907

Species of gastropod

Cerithium claviforme is a species of sea snail, a marine gastropod mollusk in the family Cerithiidae.

== Distribution ==
The distribution of Cerithium claviforme includes the Western Central Pacific.

- Guam
