= Cerithium bayeri =

Scientific classification
- Kingdom: Animalia
- Phylum: Mollusca
- Class: Gastropoda
- Subclass: Caenogastropoda
- Order: incertae sedis
- Family: Cerithiidae
- Genus: Cerithium
- Species: C. bayeri

Binomial name
- Cerithium bayeri (Petuch, 2001)

Synonyms
- Bayericerithium bayeri Petuch, 2001

Species of gastropod

Cerithium bayeri is a species of sea snail, a marine gastropod mollusk in the family Cerithiidae.

== Distribution ==
The distribution of Cerithium bayeri includes the Western Atlantic.

== Description ==
The maximum recorded shell length is 24 mm.

== Habitat ==
Minimum recorded depth is 2 m. Maximum recorded depth is 2 m.
