= Cerithium placidum =

Scientific classification
- Kingdom: Animalia
- Phylum: Mollusca
- Class: Gastropoda
- Subclass: Caenogastropoda
- Order: incertae sedis
- Family: Cerithiidae
- Genus: Cerithium
- Species: C. placidum

Binomial name
- Cerithium placidum Gould, 1861

Species of gastropod

Cerithium placidum is a species of sea snail, a marine gastropod mollusk in the family Cerithiidae.
