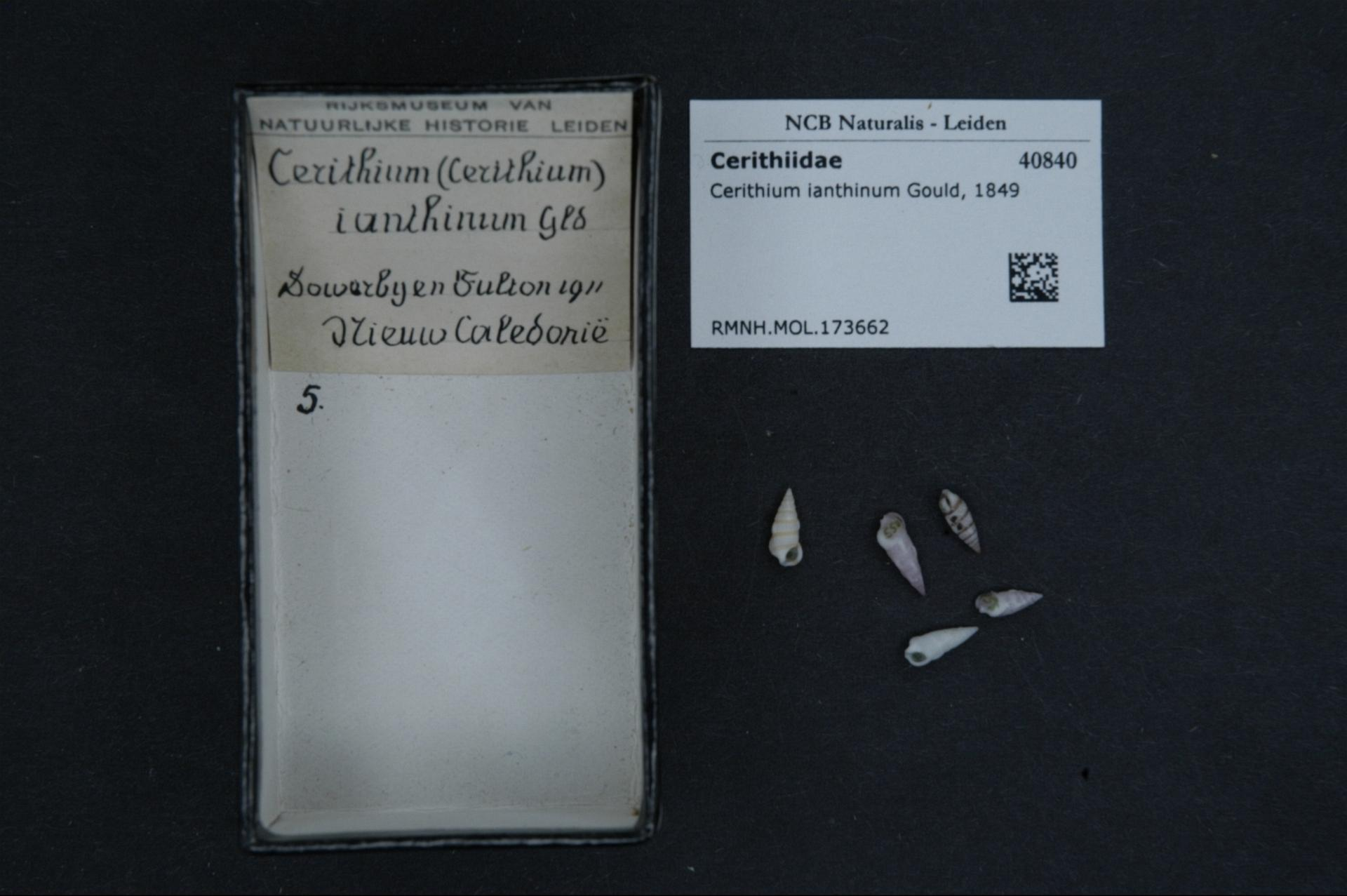
- Cerithium ianthinum, 1849

Scientific classification
- Kingdom: Animalia
- Phylum: Mollusca
- Class: Gastropoda
- Subclass: Caenogastropoda
- Order: incertae sedis
- Family: Cerithiidae
- Genus: Cerithium
- Species: C. ianthinum

Binomial name
- Cerithium ianthinum Gould, 1849

= Cerithium ianthinum =

Species of gastropod

Cerithium ianthinum is a species of sea snail, a marine gastropod mollusk in the family Cerithiidae.
