= Cerithium cecalupoi =

Scientific classification
- Kingdom: Animalia
- Phylum: Mollusca
- Class: Gastropoda
- Subclass: Caenogastropoda
- Order: incertae sedis
- Family: Cerithiidae
- Genus: Cerithium
- Species: C. cecalupoi

Binomial name
- Cerithium cecalupoi Cossignani, 2004

Synonyms
- Cerithium cecalupio Cossignani, 2004

Species of gastropod

Cerithium cecalupoi is a species of sea snail, a marine gastropod mollusk in the family Cerithiidae.
