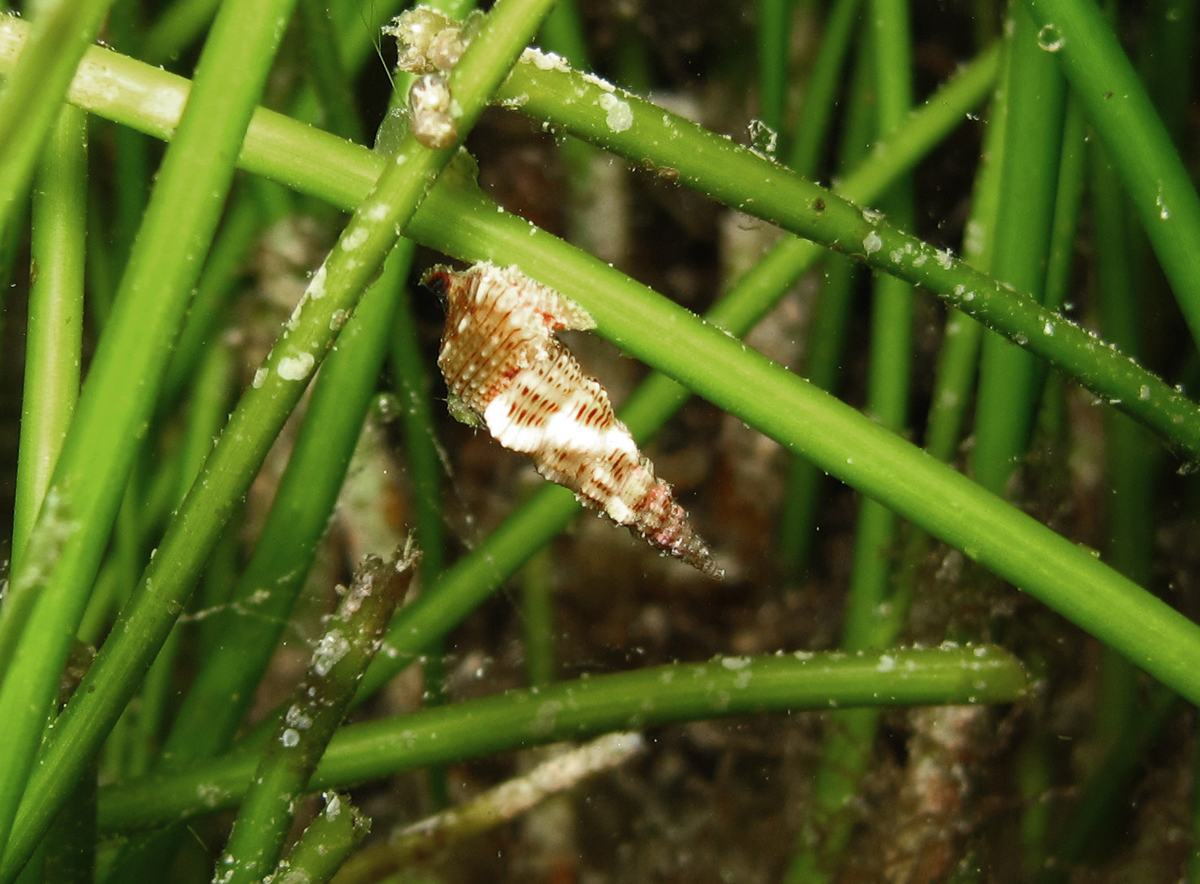

Scientific classification
- Kingdom: Animalia
- Phylum: Mollusca
- Class: Gastropoda
- Subclass: Caenogastropoda
- Order: incertae sedis
- Family: Cerithiidae
- Genus: Cerithium
- Species: C. rostratum

Binomial name
- Cerithium rostratum A. Adams in G.B. Sowerby II, 1855

Synonyms
- Cerithium (Ischnocerithium) rostratum A. Adams in G.B. Sowerby II, 1855; Cerithium (Ptychocerithium) rostratum A. Adams in G.B. Sowerby II, 1855; Cerithium albovaricosum E.A. Smith, 1884; Cerithium amabile Bayle, 1880; Cerithium gracile Pease, 1861; Colina (Ischnocerithium) rostrata (A. Adams in G.B. Sowerby II, 1855)

= Cerithium rostratum =

Species of gastropod

Cerithium rostratum is a species of sea snail, a marine gastropod mollusk in the family Cerithiidae.

== Distribution ==
The distribution of Cerithium rostratum includes the Western Central Pacific.

- Philippines
- Indonesia
- Guam
