= Cerithium ivani =

Scientific classification
- Kingdom: Animalia
- Phylum: Mollusca
- Class: Gastropoda
- Subclass: Caenogastropoda
- Order: incertae sedis
- Family: Cerithiidae
- Genus: Cerithium
- Species: C. ivani

Binomial name
- Cerithium ivani Cecalupo, 2008

Species of gastropod

Cerithium ivani is a species of sea snail, a marine gastropod mollusc in the family Cerithiidae. This species can be found in East China.
