= Cerithium africanum =

Scientific classification
- Kingdom: Animalia
- Phylum: Mollusca
- Class: Gastropoda
- Subclass: Caenogastropoda
- Order: incertae sedis
- Family: Cerithiidae
- Genus: Cerithium
- Species: C. africanum

Binomial name
- Cerithium africanum Houbrick, 1992

Species of gastropod

Cerithium africanum is a species of sea snail, a marine gastropod mollusk in the family Cerithiidae.
