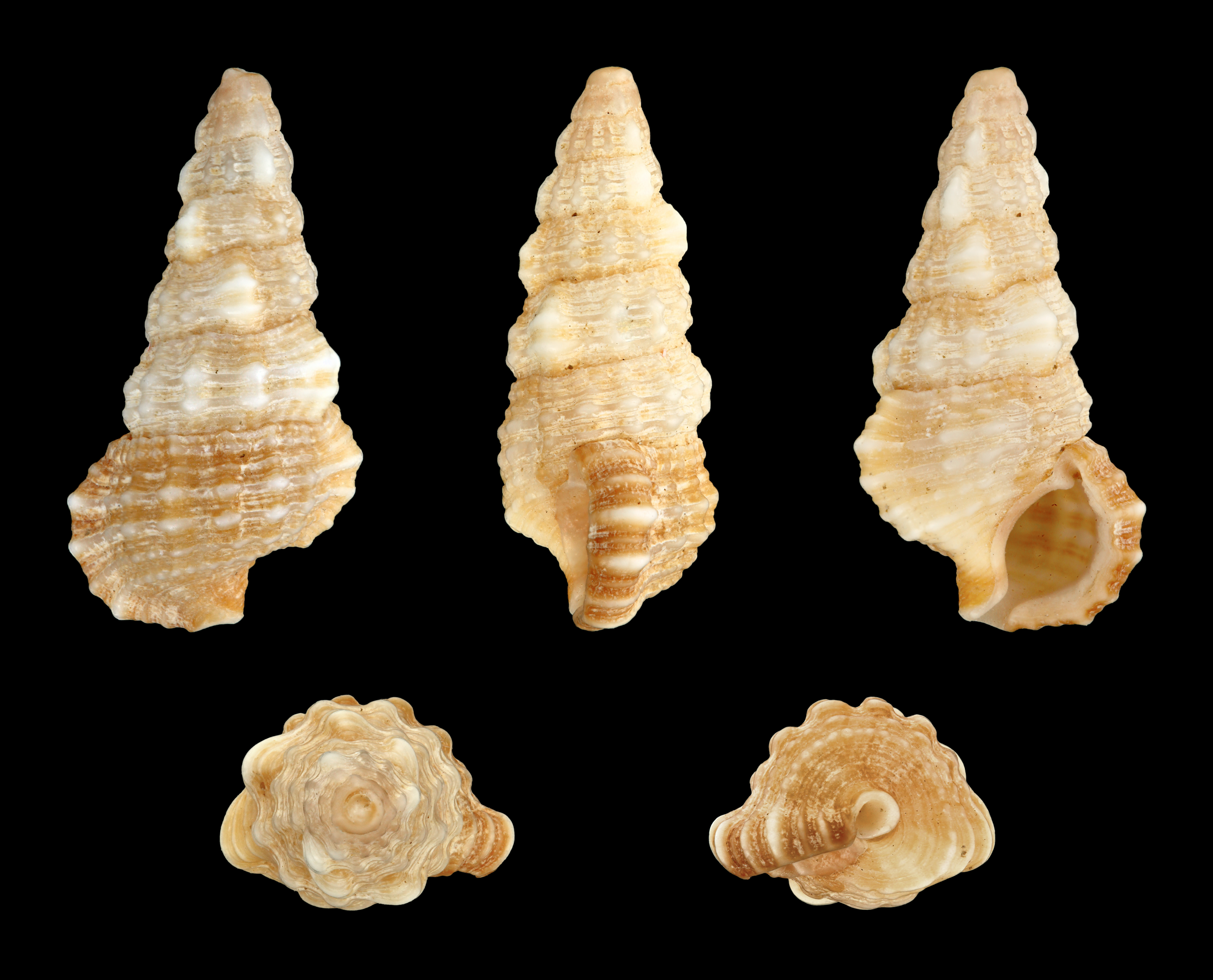

Scientific classification
- Kingdom: Animalia
- Phylum: Mollusca
- Class: Gastropoda
- Subclass: Caenogastropoda
- Order: incertae sedis
- Family: Cerithiidae
- Genus: Cerithium
- Species: C. dialeucum

Binomial name
- Cerithium dialeucum Philippi, 1849

Synonyms
- Cerithium bicolor Hombron & Jacquinot, 1852; Cerithium kobelti Dunker, 1877; Cerithium striatum Hombron & Jacquinot, 1852; Cerithium suturale Philippi, 1849

= Cerithium dialeucum =

Species of gastropod

Cerithium dialeucum is a species of sea snail, a marine gastropod mollusk in the family Cerithiidae.

== Distribution ==
The distribution of Cerithium dialeucum includes the Western Central Pacific.

- Philippines
- Guam
