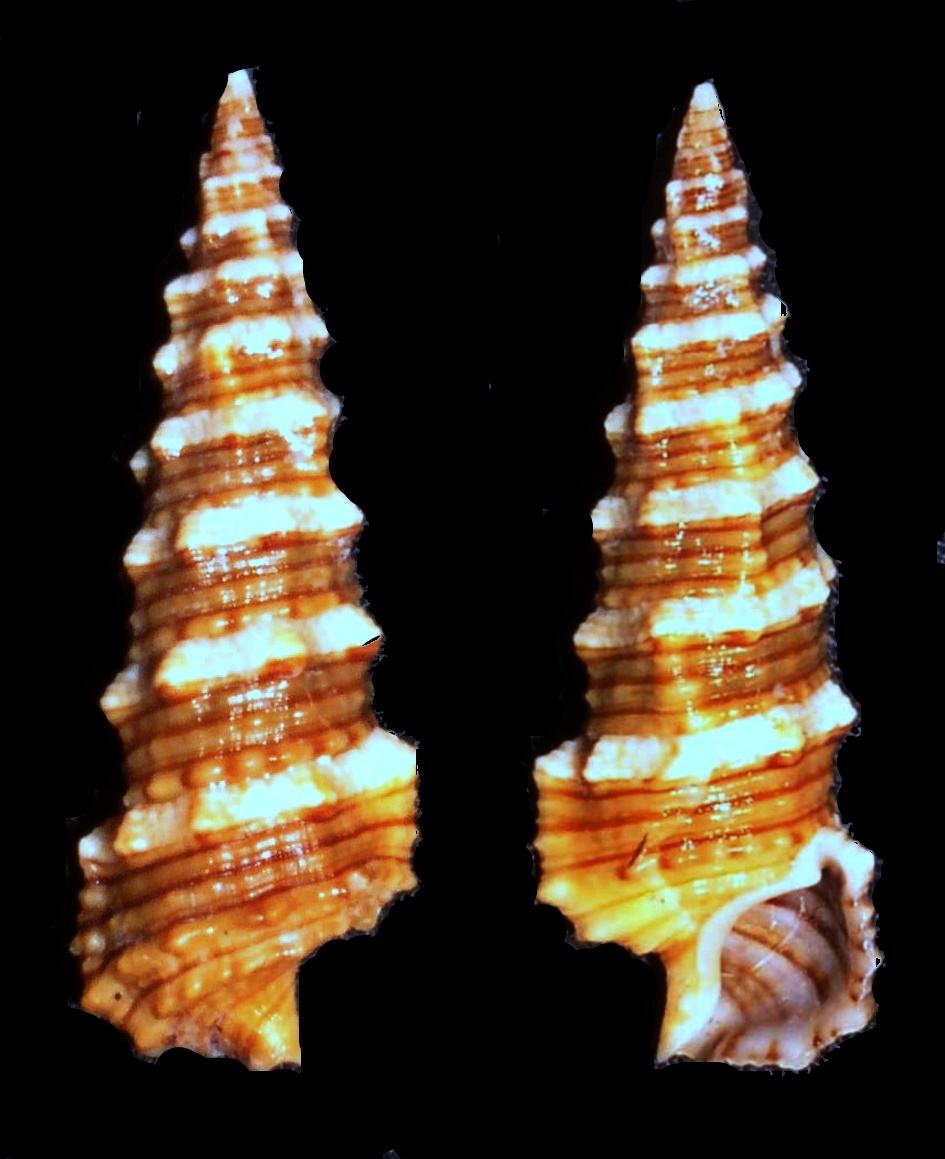
- shells of Cerithium lifuense

Scientific classification
- Kingdom: Animalia
- Phylum: Mollusca
- Class: Gastropoda
- Subclass: Caenogastropoda
- Order: incertae sedis
- Family: Cerithiidae
- Genus: Cerithium
- Species: C. lifuense

Binomial name
- Cerithium lifuense Melvill & Standen, 1895

Synonyms
- Cerithium armatum Philippi, 1848; Cerithium armatum var. lifuensis Melvill & Standen, 1895

= Cerithium lifuense =

Species of gastropod

Cerithium lifuense is a species of sea snail, a marine gastropod mollusk in the family Cerithiidae.

== Distribution ==
The distribution of Cerithium lifuense includes the Western Pacific.

- Taiwan
- Philippines
- Indonesia
