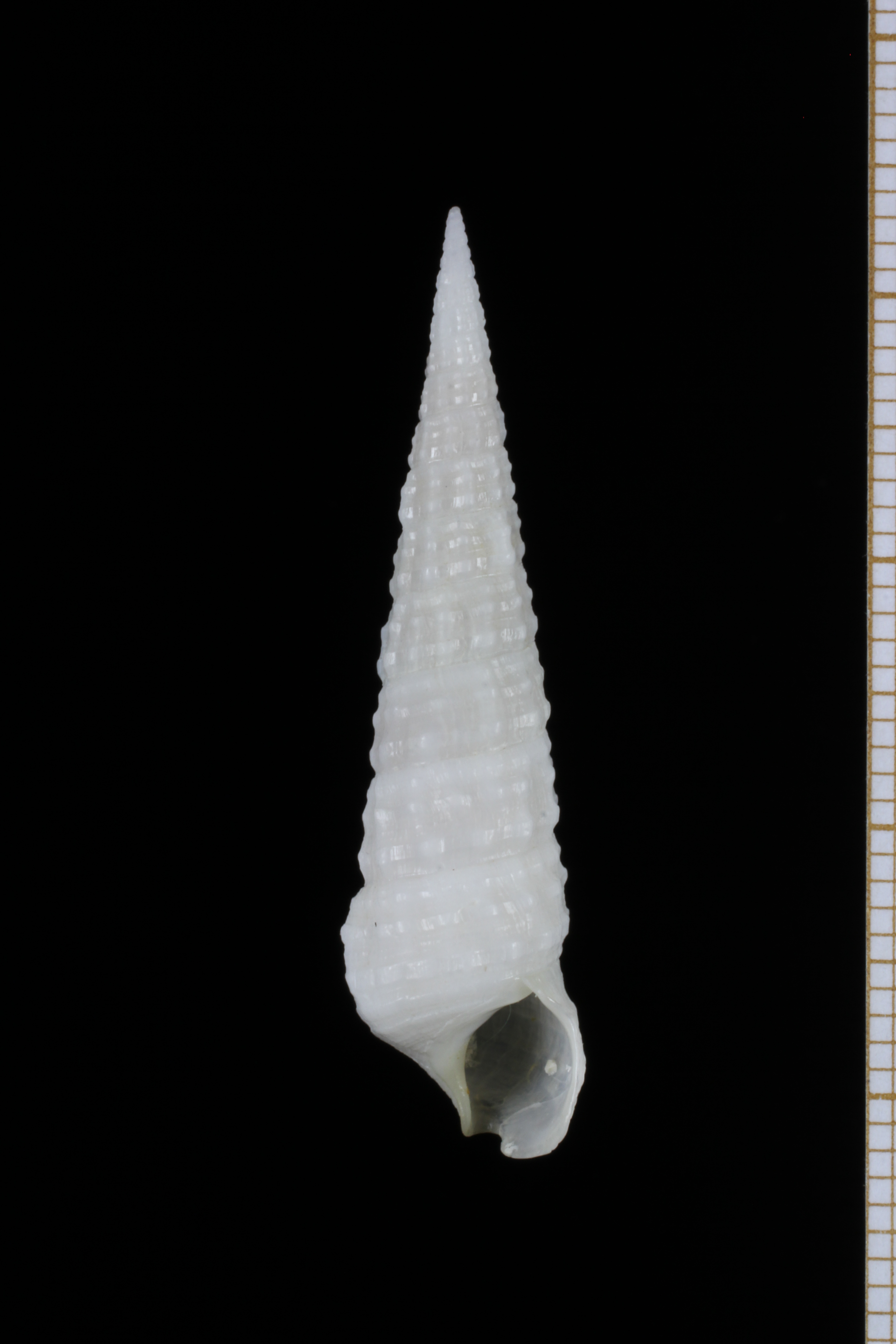
- Shell of Cerithium flemischi (specimen at MNHN, Paris)

Scientific classification
- Kingdom: Animalia
- Phylum: Mollusca
- Class: Gastropoda
- Subclass: Caenogastropoda
- Order: incertae sedis
- Family: Cerithiidae
- Genus: Cerithium
- Species: C. flemischi

Binomial name
- Cerithium flemischi Martin, 1933

= Cerithium flemischi =

Species of gastropod

Cerithium flemischi is a species of sea snail, a marine gastropod mollusk in the family Cerithiidae.

== Distribution ==
The distribution of Cerithium flemischi includes the Western Central Pacific.

- Philippines
- Mozambique Channel, Southern Africa
