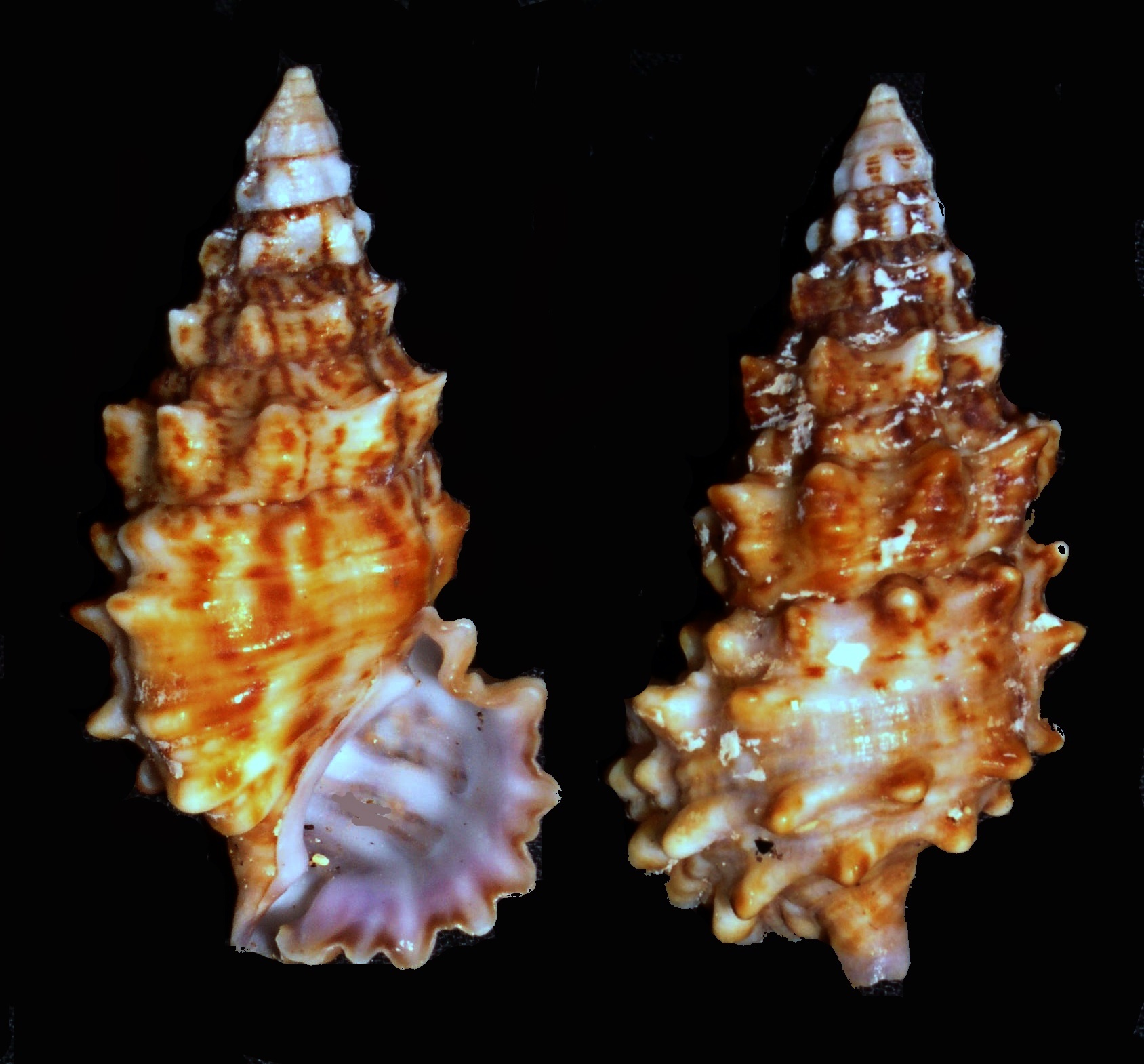
- Two views of a shell of Cerithium echinatum, the "spiny creeper"

Scientific classification
- Kingdom: Animalia
- Phylum: Mollusca
- Class: Gastropoda
- Subclass: Caenogastropoda
- Order: incertae sedis
- Family: Cerithiidae
- Subfamily: Cerithiinae
- Genus: Cerithium; Bruguière, 1789

Type species
- Cerithium adansonii Bruguière, 1792

Synonyms
- Bayericerithium Petuch, 2001; Cerithium (Cerithium) Bruguière, 1789· accepted, alternate representation; † Cerithium (Chondrocerithium) Monterosato in Cossmann, 1906 · accepted, alternate representation; Cerithium (Conocerithium) Sacco, 1895; Cerithium (Contumax) Hedley, 1899; Cerithium (Gladiocerithium) Monterosato, 1910; Cerithium (Hirtocerithium) Monterosato, 1910; Cerithium (Ischnocerithium) Thiele, 1929; Cerithium (Pithocerithium) Sacco, 1895; Cerithium (Thericium) Monterosato, 1890; Cerithium (Vulgocerithium) Cossmann, 1895; Colina (Ischnocerithium) Thiele, 1929; Conocerithium Sacco, 1895; Contumax Hedley, 1899; Drillocerithium Monterosato, 1910; Gladiocerithium Monterosato, 1910; Gourmierium Jousseaume, 1894; Gourmya (Gladiocerithium) Monterosato, 1910; Hirtocerithium Monterosato, 1910; † Liocerithium Sacco, 1894; Lithocerithium Monterosato, 1910; Rhinoclavis (Ochetoclava) Woodring, 1928; Semivertagus Cossman; Thericium Monterosato; Tiaracerithium Sacco, 1895; Ischnocerithium Thiele, 1929

= Cerithium =

Cerithium Temporal range: Triassic–Recent

Genus of gastropods

Cerithium is a genus of small to medium-sized sea snails, marine gastropod molluscs in the family Cerithiidae, the ceriths.

== Species ==
Species within this genus include:

- Cerithium abditum Houbrick, 1992
- Cerithium adustum Kiener, 1841
- Cerithium africanum Houbrick, 1992
- Cerithium albolineatum Bozzetti, 2008
- Cerithium alucastrum (Brocchi, 1814)
- Cerithium alutaceum (Gould, 1861)
- Cerithium atratum (Born, 1778)
- Cerithium atromarginatum Dautzenberg & Bouge, 1933
- Cerithium balletoni Cecalupo, 2009
- Cerithium balteatum Philippi, 1848
- Cerithium bayeri (Petuch, 2001)
- Cerithium boeticum Pease, 1860
- Cerithium browni (Bartsch, 1928)
- Cerithium buzzurroi Cecalupo, 2005
- Cerithium caeruleum Sowerby, 1855
- † Cerithium calculosum Basterot, 1825
- Cerithium cecalupoi Cossignani, 2004
- Cerithium citrinum Sowerby, 1855
- Cerithium claviforme Schepman, 1907
- Cerithium columna Sowerby, 1834
- Cerithium coralium Kiener, 1841
- Cerithium crassilabrum Krauss, 1848
- Cerithium dialeucum Philippi, 1849
- Cerithium eburneum Bruguière, 1792
- Cerithium echinatum Lamarck, 1842
- Cerithium egenum Gould, 1849
- † Cerithium excavatum Brongniart in Cuvier & Brongniart, 1822
- Cerithium flemischi Martin, 1933
- Cerithium gallapaginis G.B. Sowerby, 1855
- Cerithium gemmatum Hinds, 1844
- Cerithium georgianum Pfeffer, 1886
- Cerithium gloriosum Houbrick, 1992
- Cerithium gracilis Philippi, 1836
- Cerithium guinaicum Philippi, 1849
- Cerithium heteroclites Lamarck, 1822
- Cerithium ianthinum Gould, 1849
- Cerithium interstriatum Sowerby, 1855
- Cerithium ivani Cecalupo, 2008
- Cerithium janthinum (Gould, 1849 in 1846–50) : synonym of Cerithium zebrum Kiener, 1841
- Cerithium kobelti Dunker, 1877 : synonym of Cerithium dialeucum Philippi, 1849
- Cerithium kreukelorum van Gemert, 2012
- Cerithium leptocharactum Rehder, 1980
- Cerithium lifuense Melvill & Standen, 1895
- Cerithium lindae Petuch, 1987
- Cerithium lissum Watson, 1880
- Cerithium litteratum (Born, 1778)
- Cerithium lividulum Risso, 1826
- Cerithium lorenzi Bozzetti, 2020
- Cerithium lutosum Menke, 1828
- Cerithium maculosum Kiener, 1841
- † Cerithium madreporicola Jousseaume, 1931
- Cerithium madreporicola Jousseaume, 1930
- Cerithium mangrovum Q.-M. Sun & S.-P. Zhang, 2014
- Cerithium matukense Watson, 1886
- Cerithium mediolaeve Carpenter, 1857
- Cerithium menkei Carpenter, 1857
- † Cerithium miocanariensis Martín-González & Vera-Peláez, 2018
- Cerithium moniliferum Kiener, 1842 : synonym of Clypeomorus batillariaeformis Habe & Kosuge, 1966
- Cerithium munitum Sowerby, 1855
- Cerithium muscarum Say, 1832
- Cerithium nesioticum Pilsbry & Vanatta, 1906
- Cerithium nicaraguense Pilsbry & Lowe, 1932
- Cerithium nodulosum Bruguière, 1792
- Cerithium novaehollandiae Adams in Sowerby, 1855
- Cerithium ophioderma (Habe, 1968)
- Cerithium pacificum Houbrick, 1992
- Cerithium phoxum Watson, 1880
- Cerithium placidum Gould, 1861
- Cerithium protractum Bivona Ant. in Bivona And., 1838
- Cerithium punctatum Bruguière, 1792
- Cerithium rehderi Houbrick, 1992
- Cerithium renovatum Monterosato, 1884
- Cerithium rostratum Sowerby, 1855
- Cerithium rubus Deshayes, 1843: synonym of Cerithium echinatum Lamarck, 1822
- Cerithium rueppelli Philippi, 1848
- † Cerithium rufonodulosum E. A. Smith, 1901
- Cerithium salebrosum Sowerby, 1855
- Cerithium scabridum Philippi, 1848
- Cerithium scobiniforme Houbrick, 1992
- Cerithium spinosum Philippi, 1836
- Cerithium stercumuscarum Valenciennes, 1833
- Cerithium subscalatum Pilsbry, 1904
- † Cerithium taeniagranulosum Lozouet, 1999 †
- Cerithium tenellum Sowerby, 1855
- Cerithium torresi Smith, 1884
- Cerithium torulosum (Linnaeus, 1767)
- Cerithium traillii Sowerby, 1855
- † Cerithium trochleare Lamarck, 1804
- Cerithium tuberculatum (Linnaeus, 1767)
- Cerithium uncinatum (Gmelin, 1791)
- Cerithium virgatum Montfort, 1810 (nomen dubium)
- Cerithium vulgatum Bruguière, 1792
- Cerithium zebrum (Kiener, 1841)
- Cerithium zonatum (Wood, 1828)

== Fossil records ==
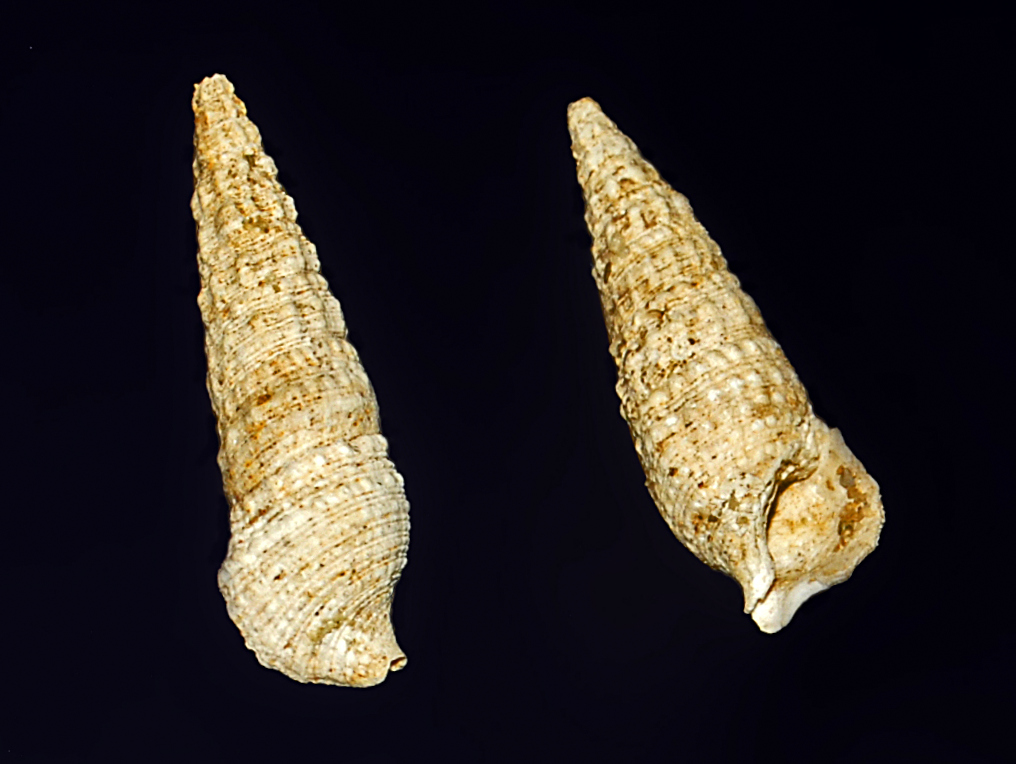
Fossil shells of Cerithium crenatum from Pliocene of Italy

The genus is known from the Triassic to the Recent periods (age range: from 221.5 to 0.0 million years ago). Fossils shells have been found all over the world. There are about 100 extinct species including:

- Cerithium crenatum from the Pliocene of Italy
- Cerithium elegans Deshayes, 1824
- Cerithium cattleyae Baily, 1856 from Miocene of Crimea and South Russia

== Gallery ==
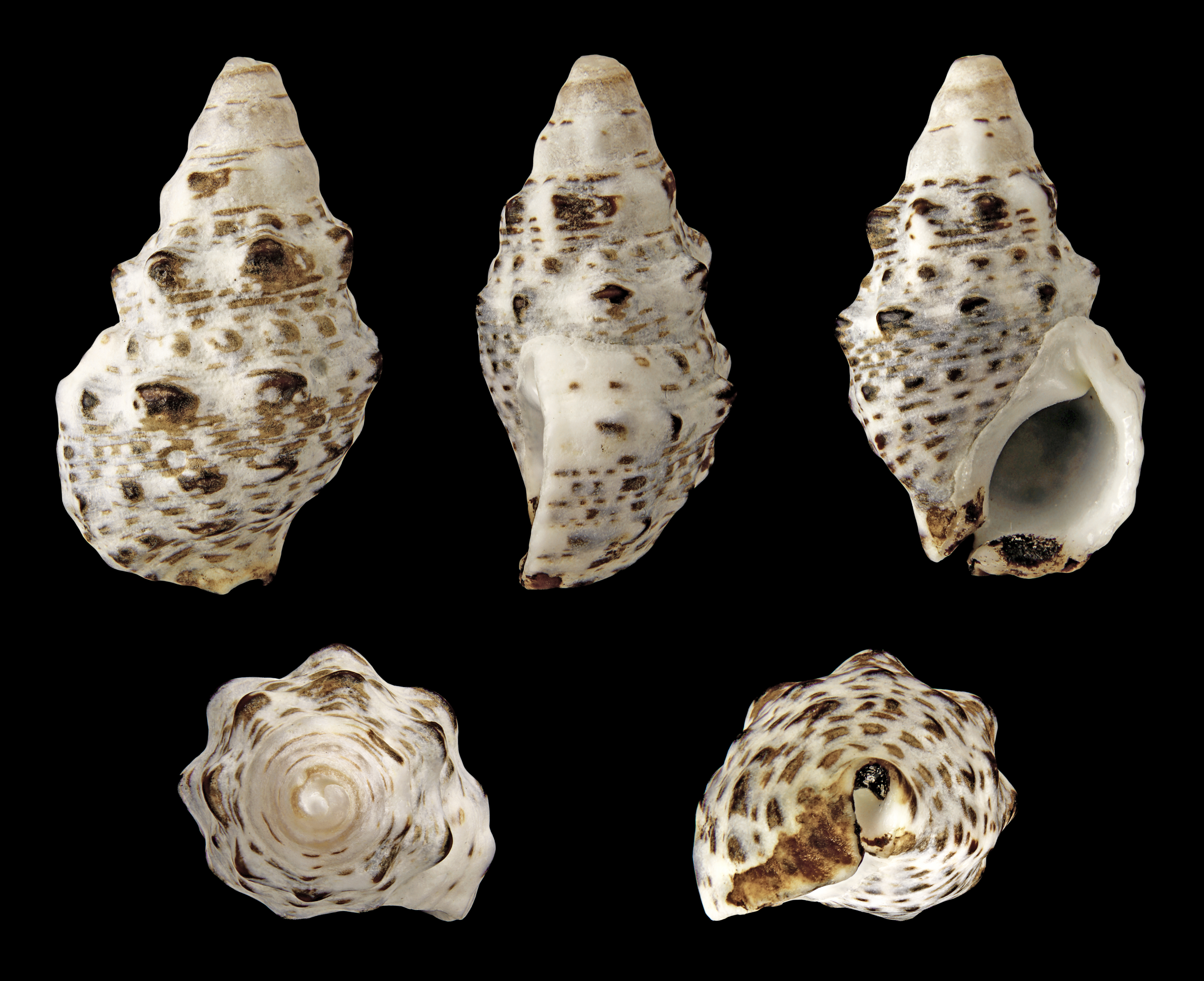
Cerithium caeruleum

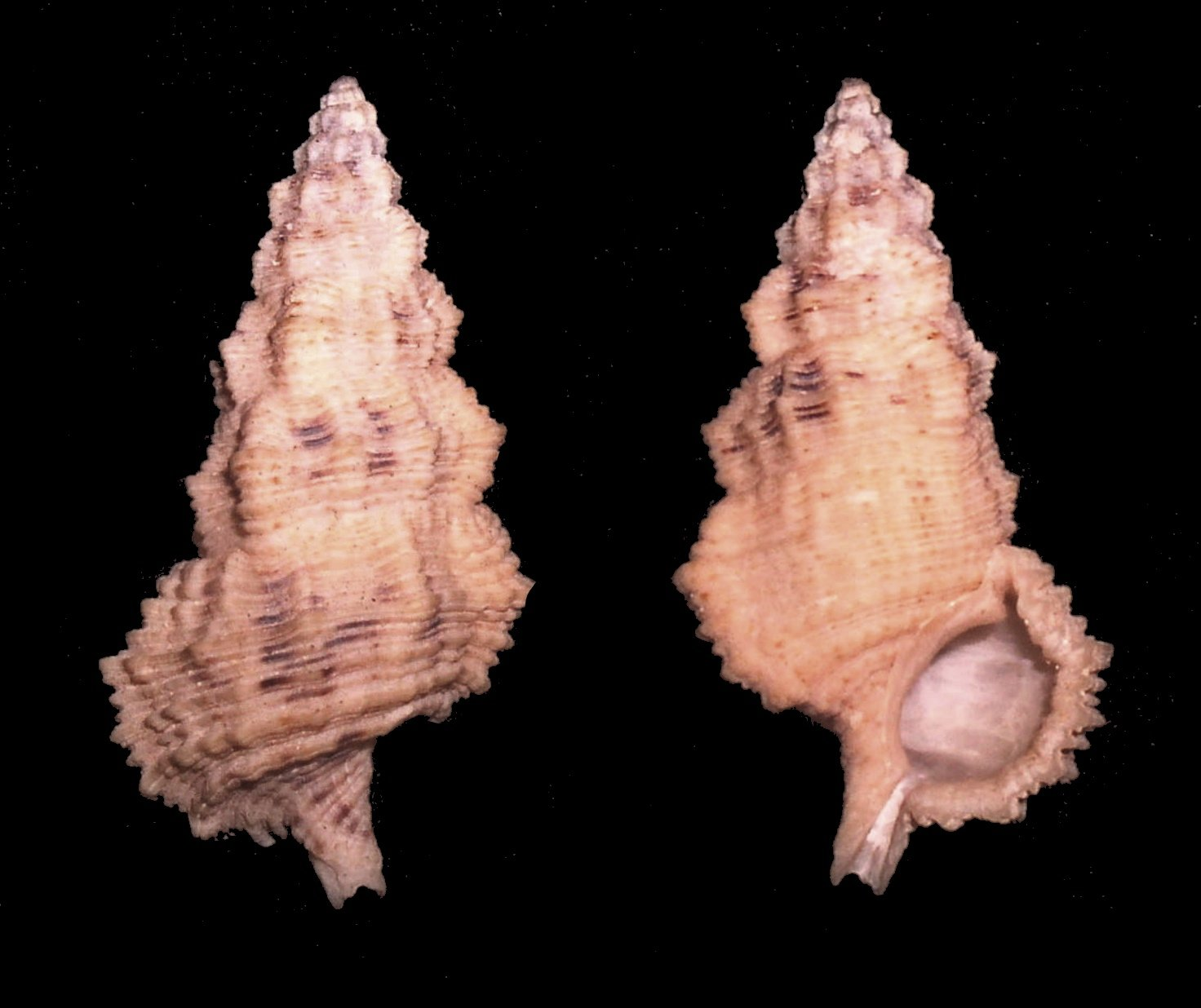
Cerithium columna

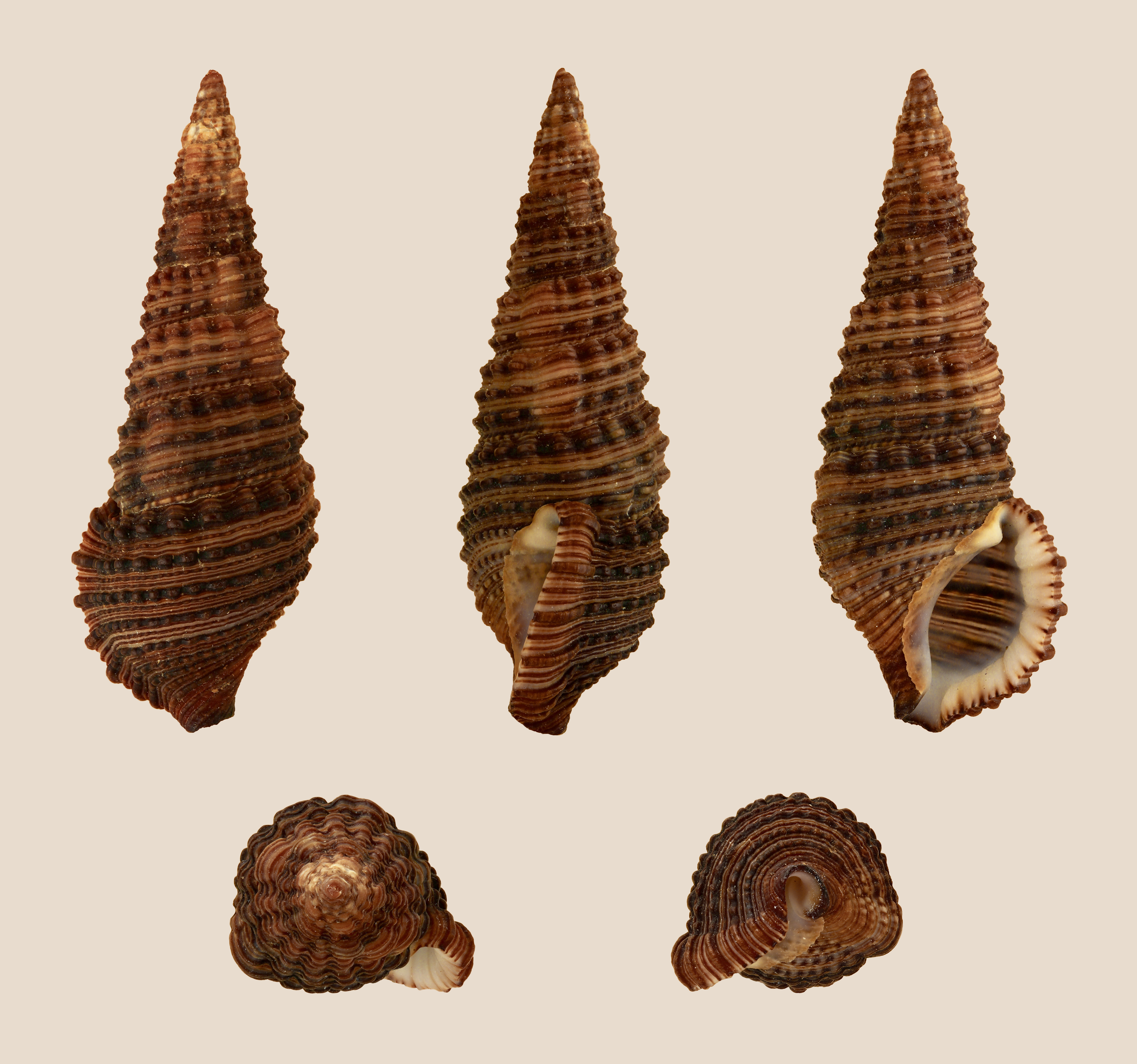
Cerithium coralium

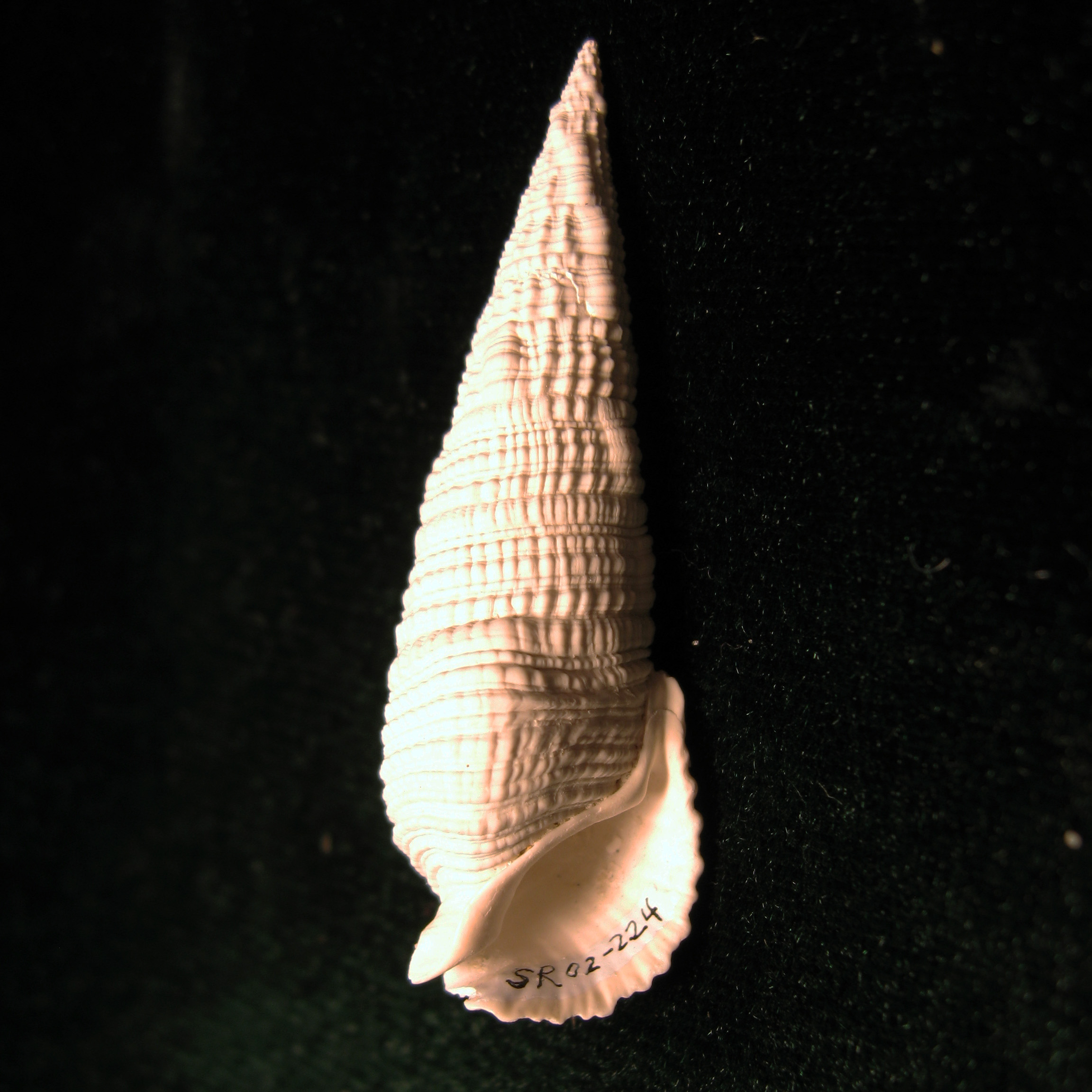
Cerithium dalli

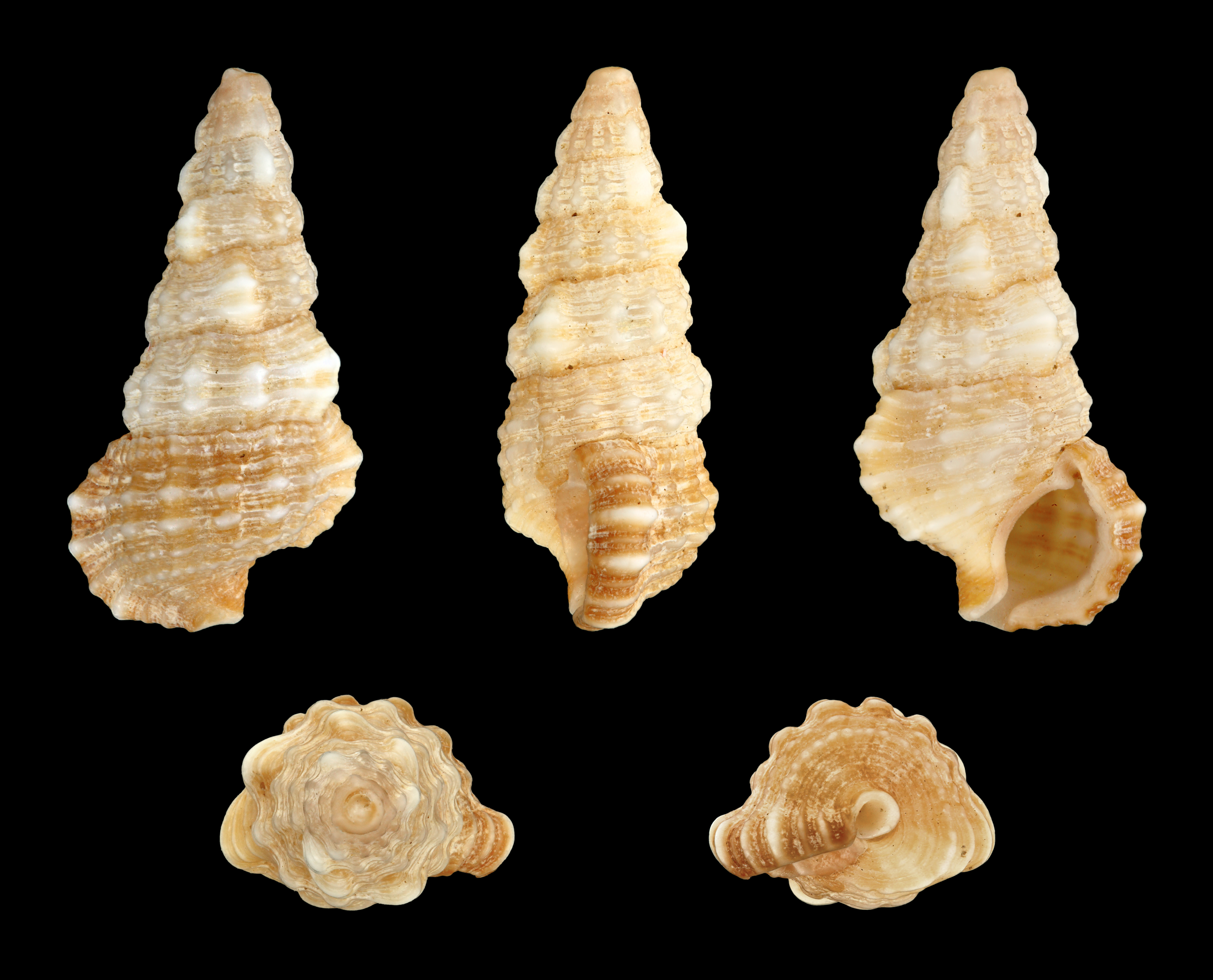
Cerithium dialeucum

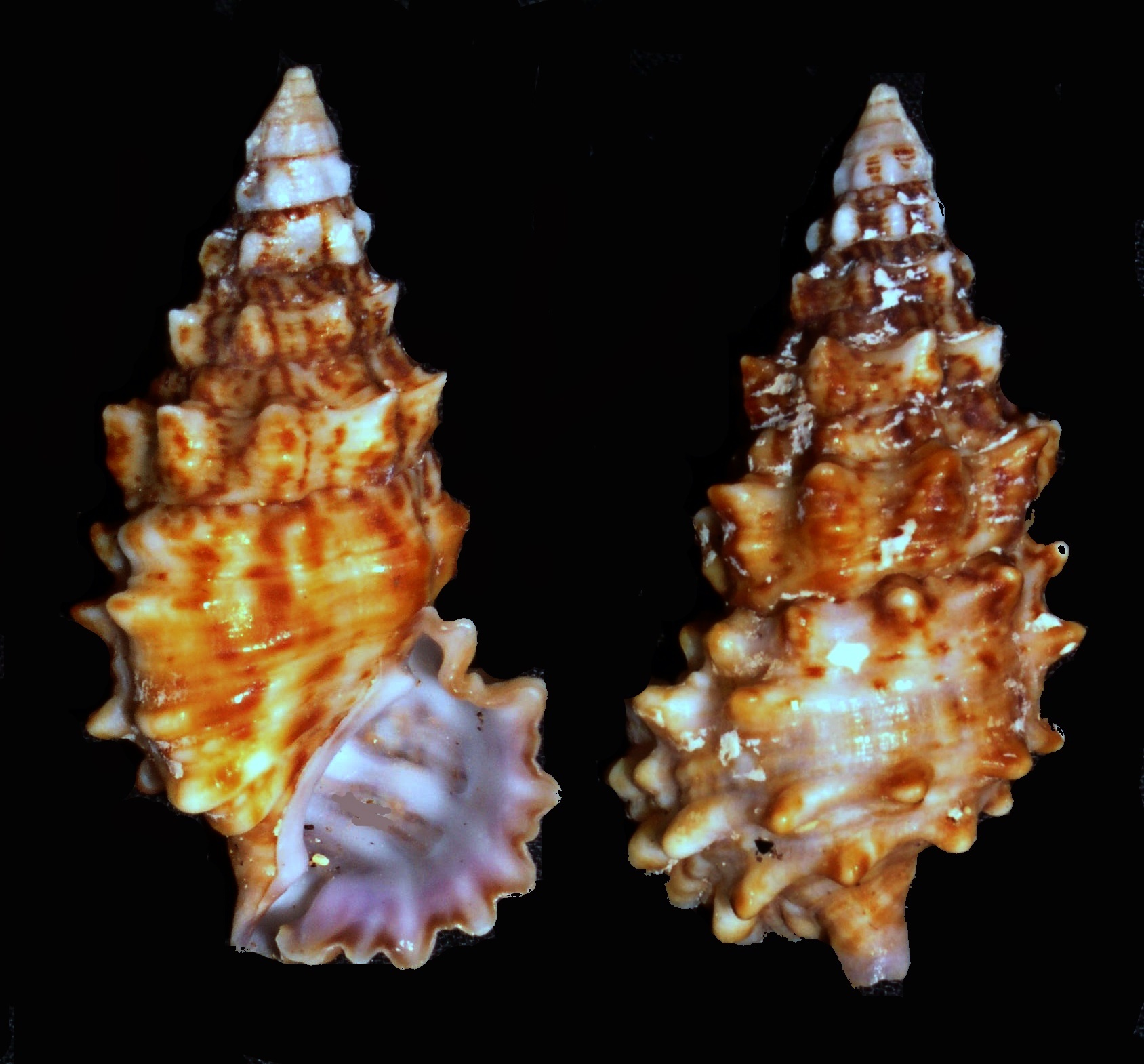
Cerithium echinatum

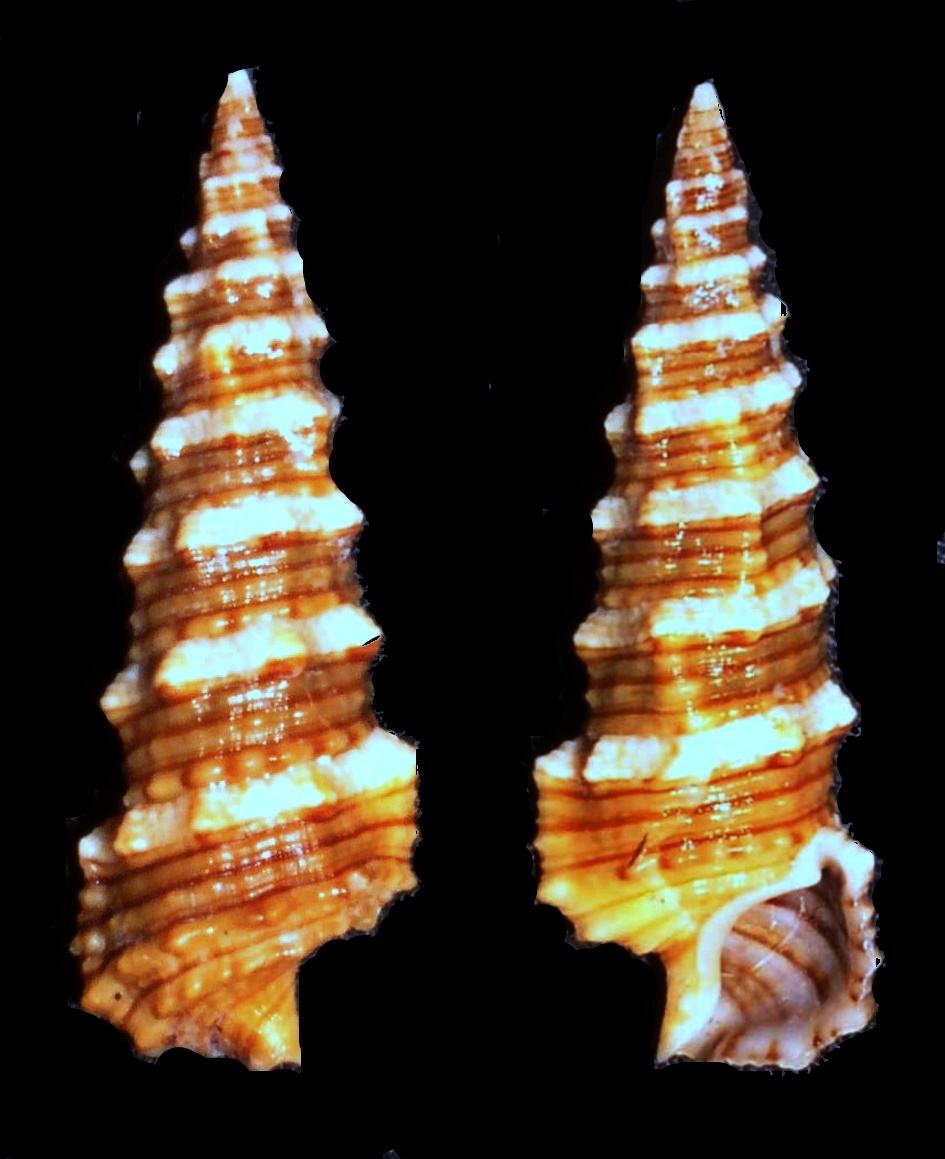
Cerithium lifuense

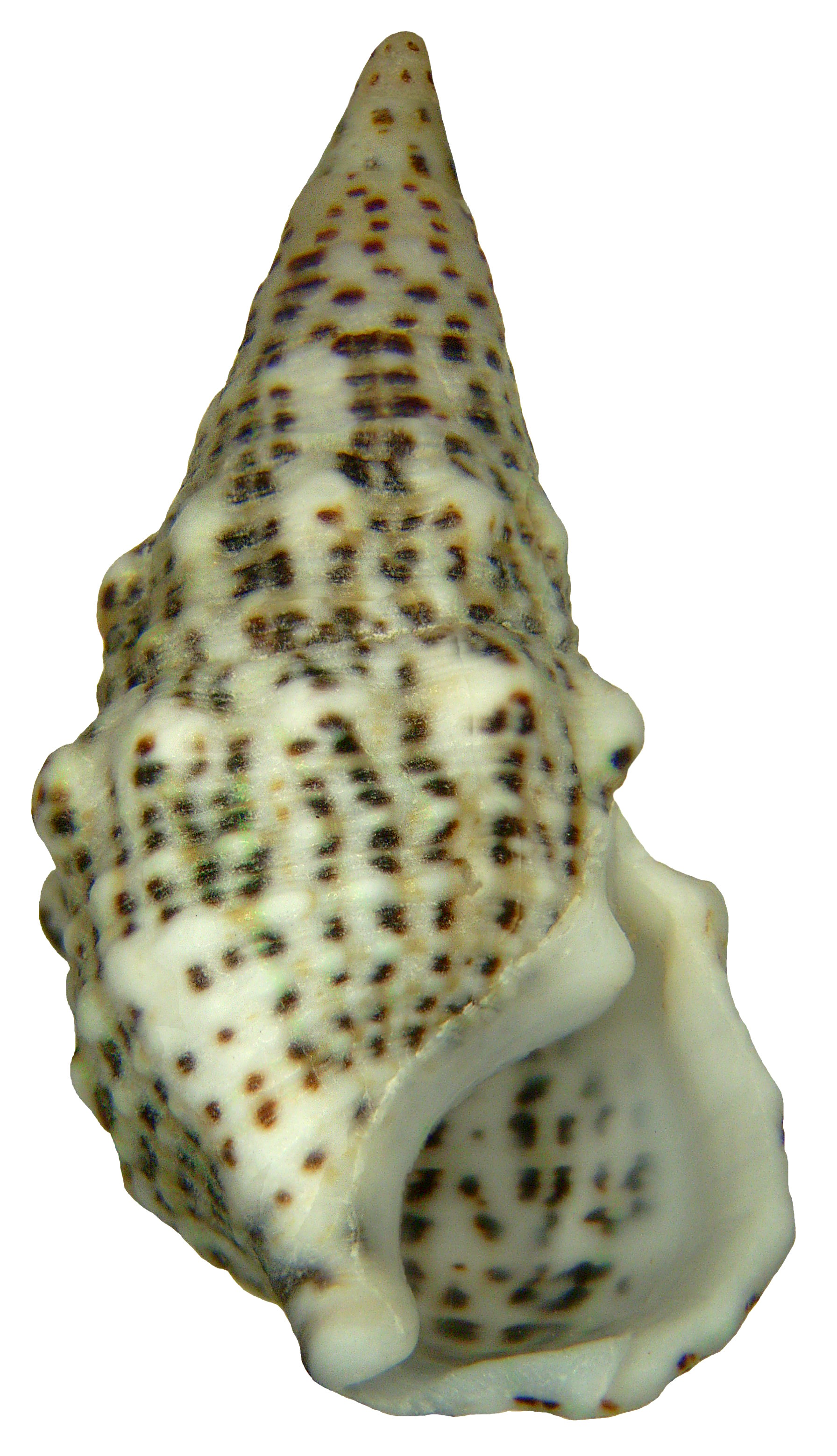
Cerithium litteratum

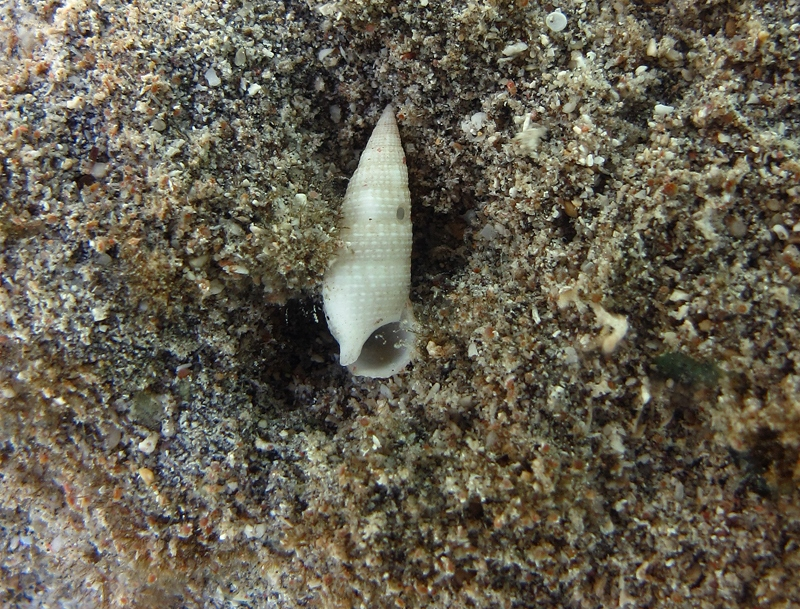
Cerithium nesioticum

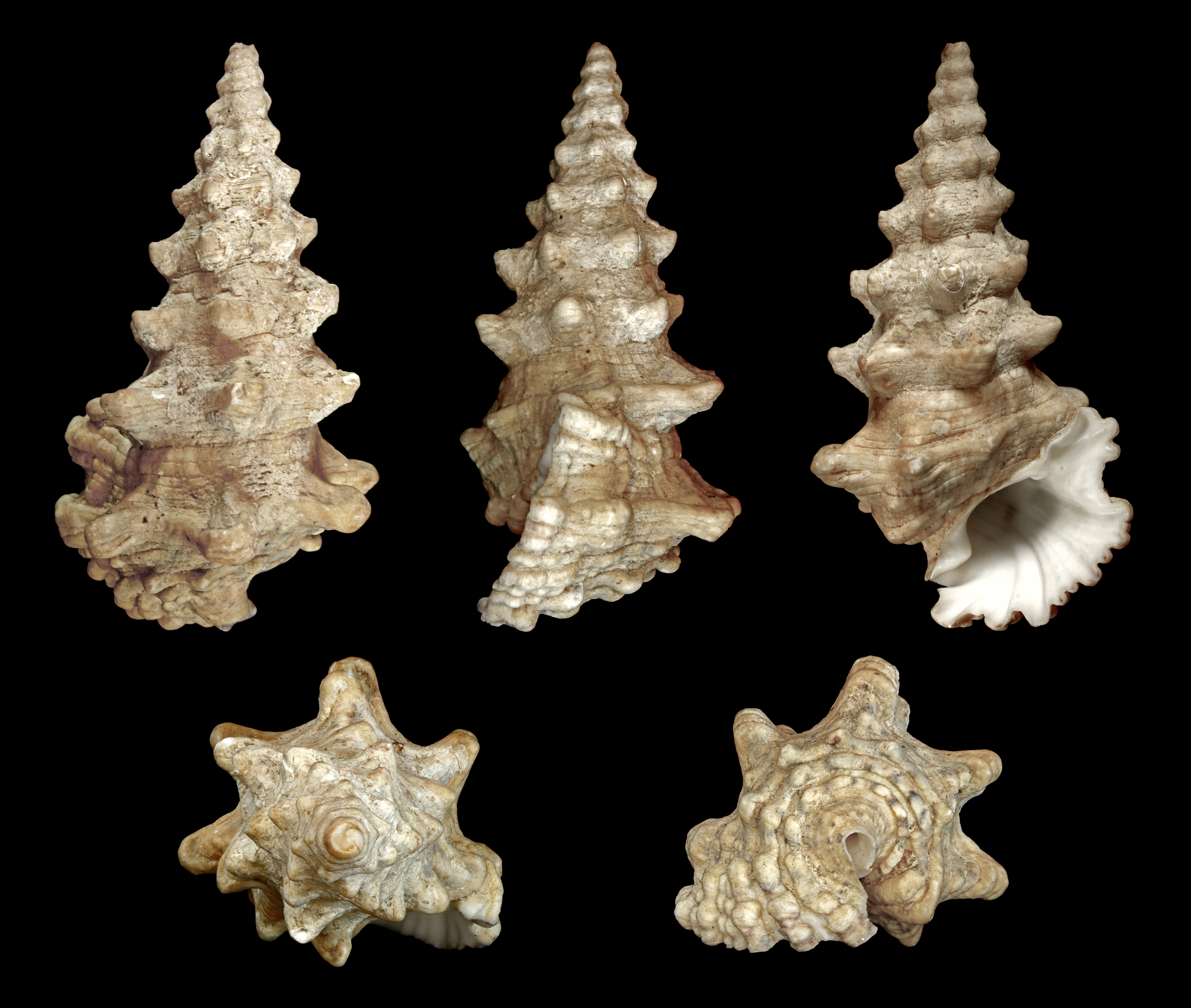
Cerithium nodulosum

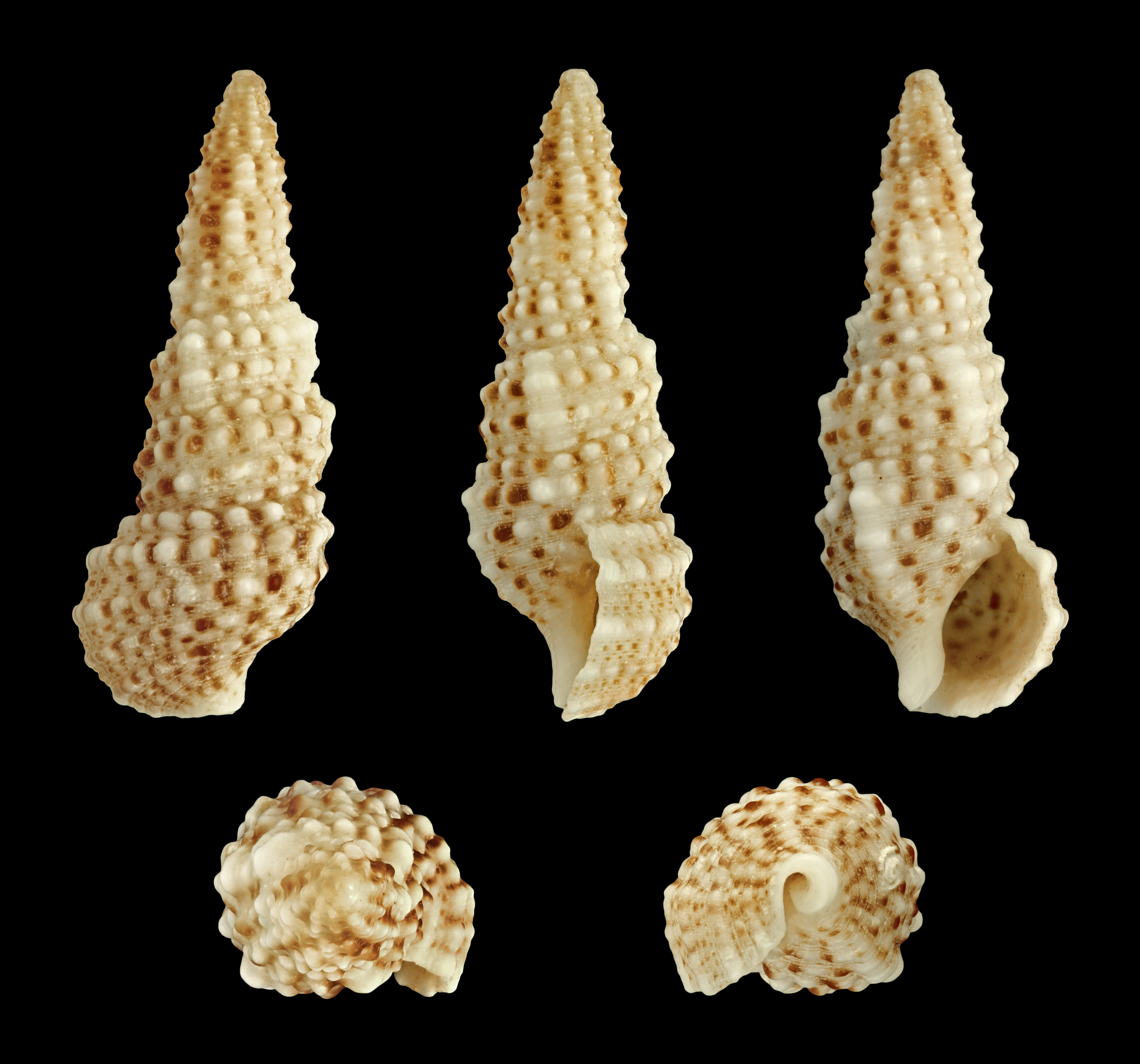
Cerithium scabridum

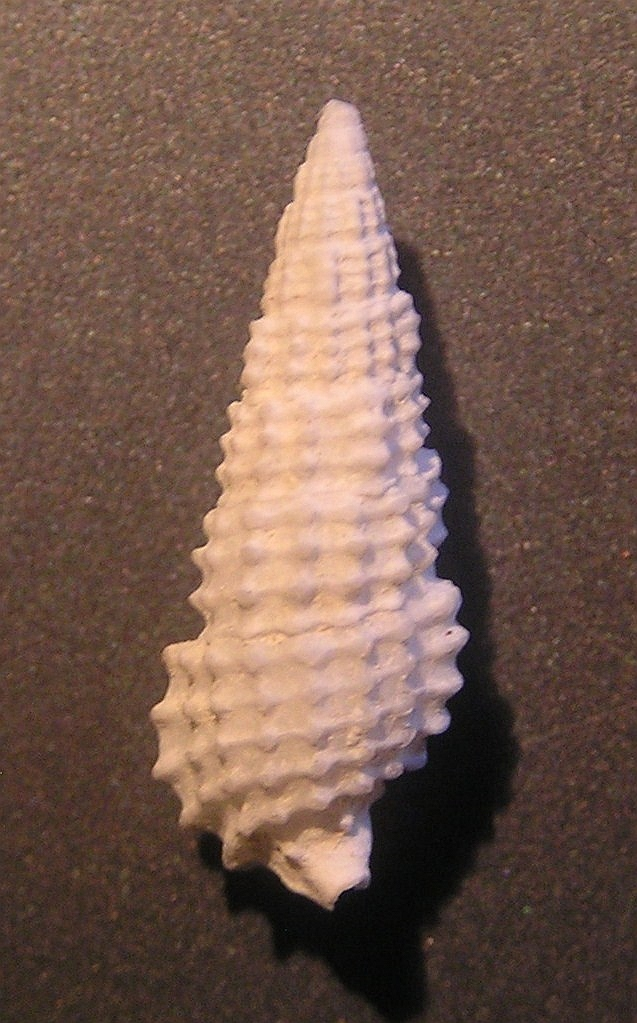
Cerithium scobiniforme

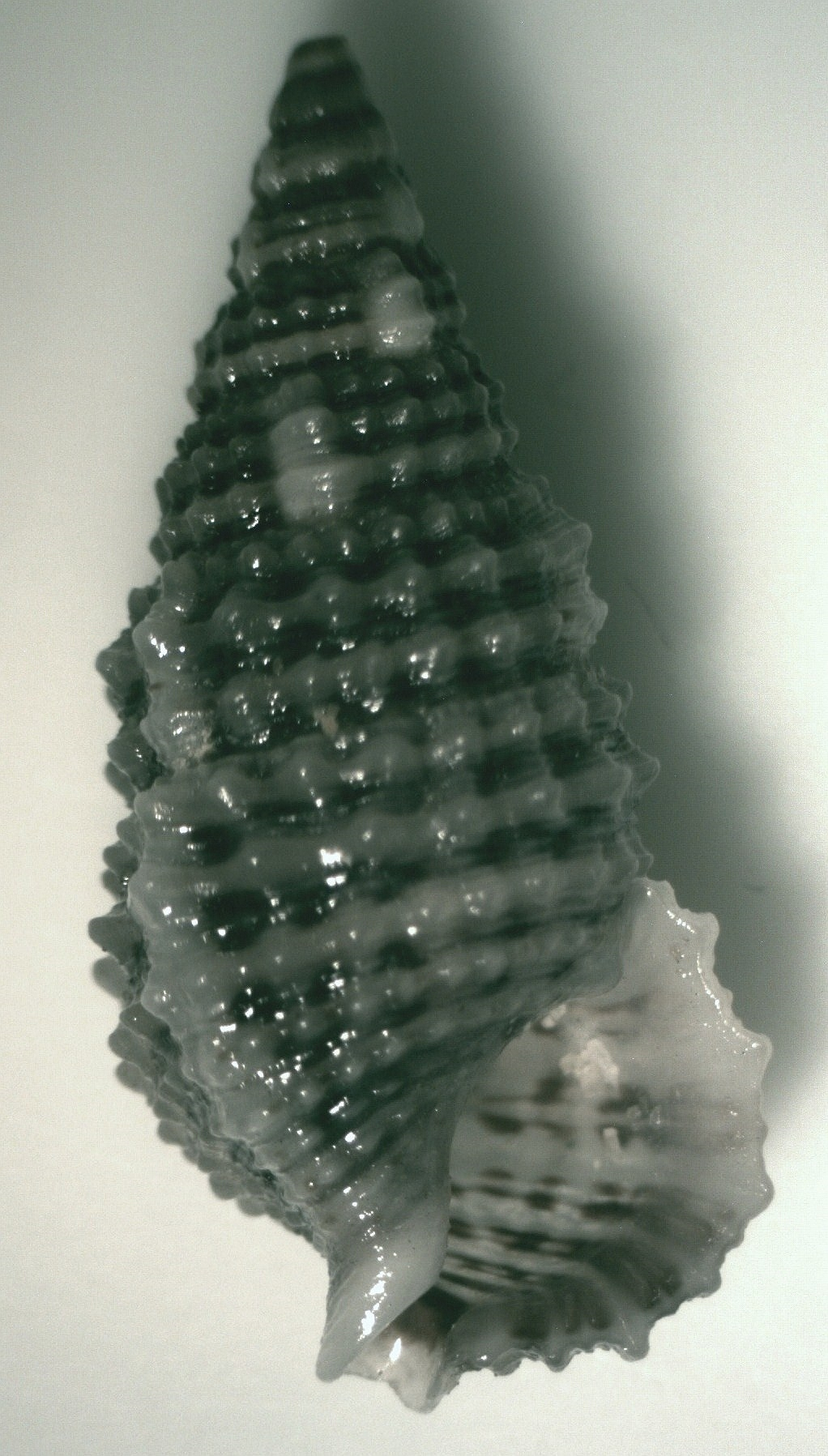
Cerithium tenellum

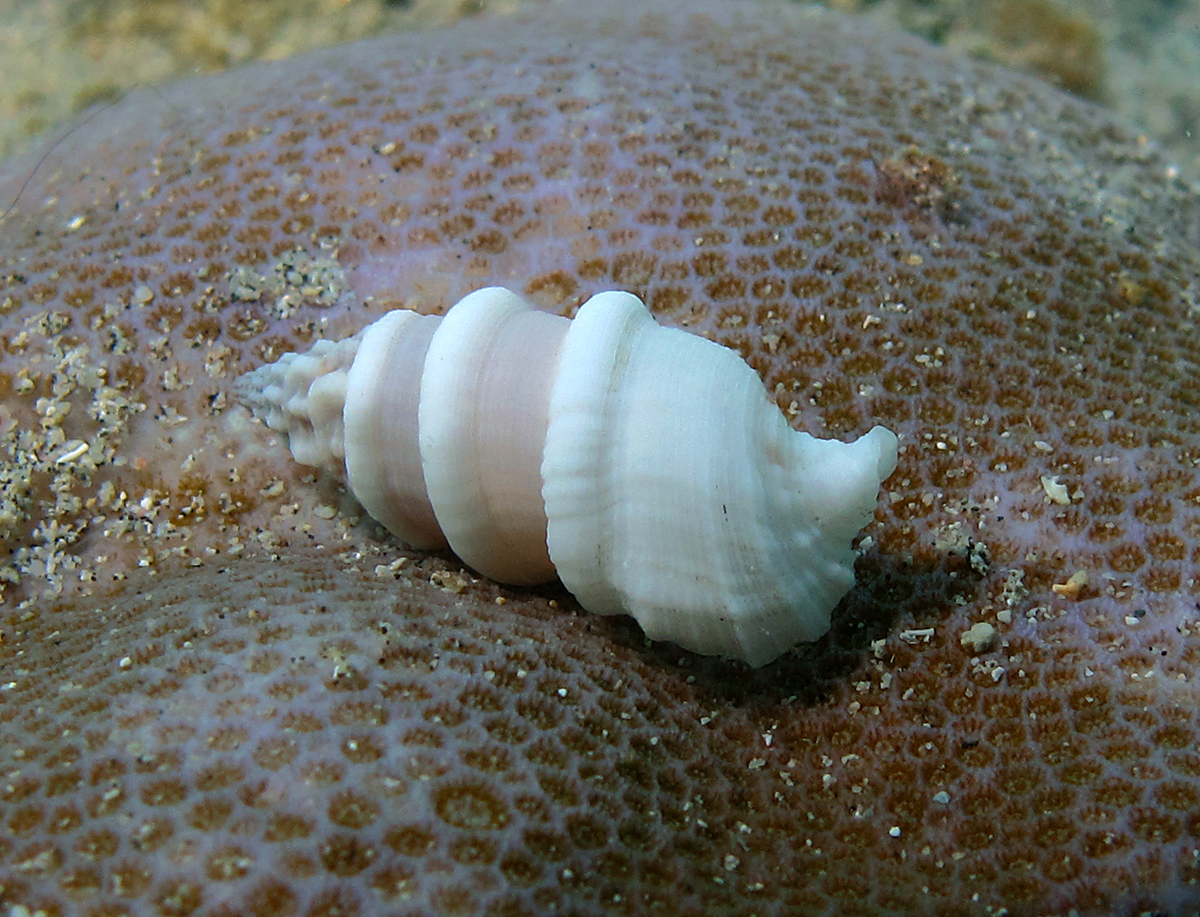
Cerithium torulosum

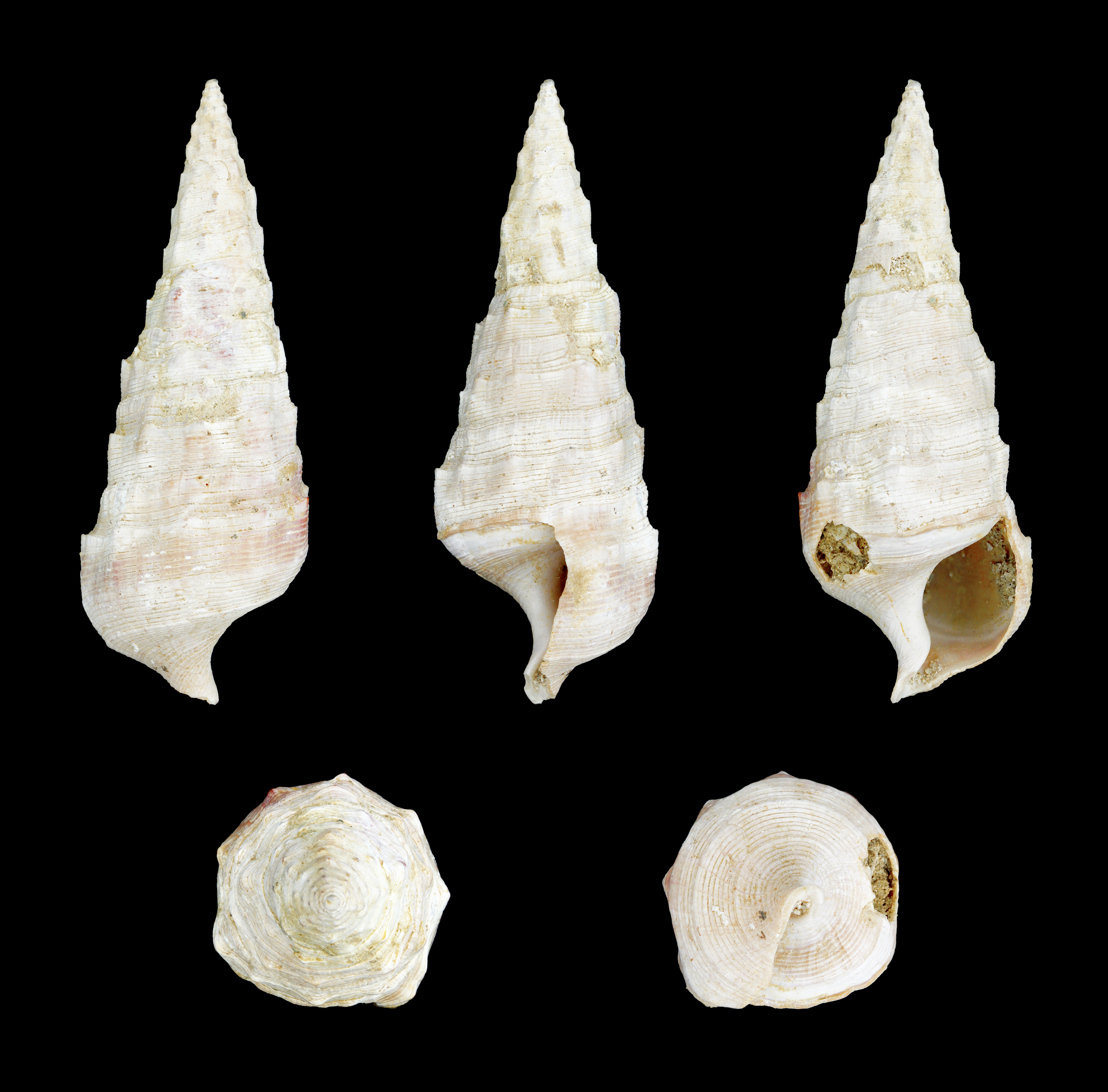
Cerithium varicosum

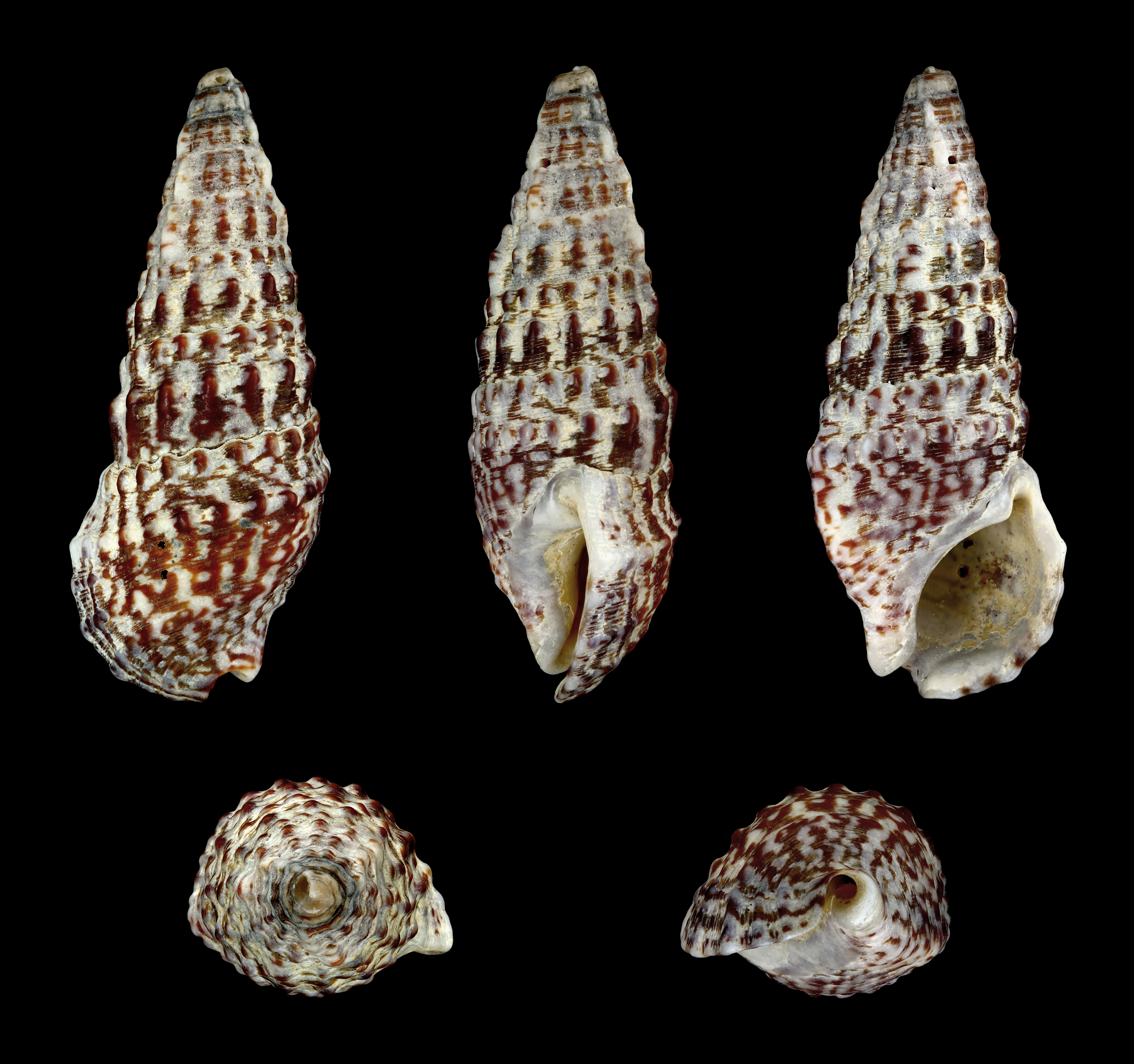
Cerithium vulgatum

50 second video of snails (most likely Natica chemnitzi and Cerithium muscarum) feeding on the sea floor in the Gulf of California, Puerto Peñasco, Mexico

== See also ==
- Bittium
