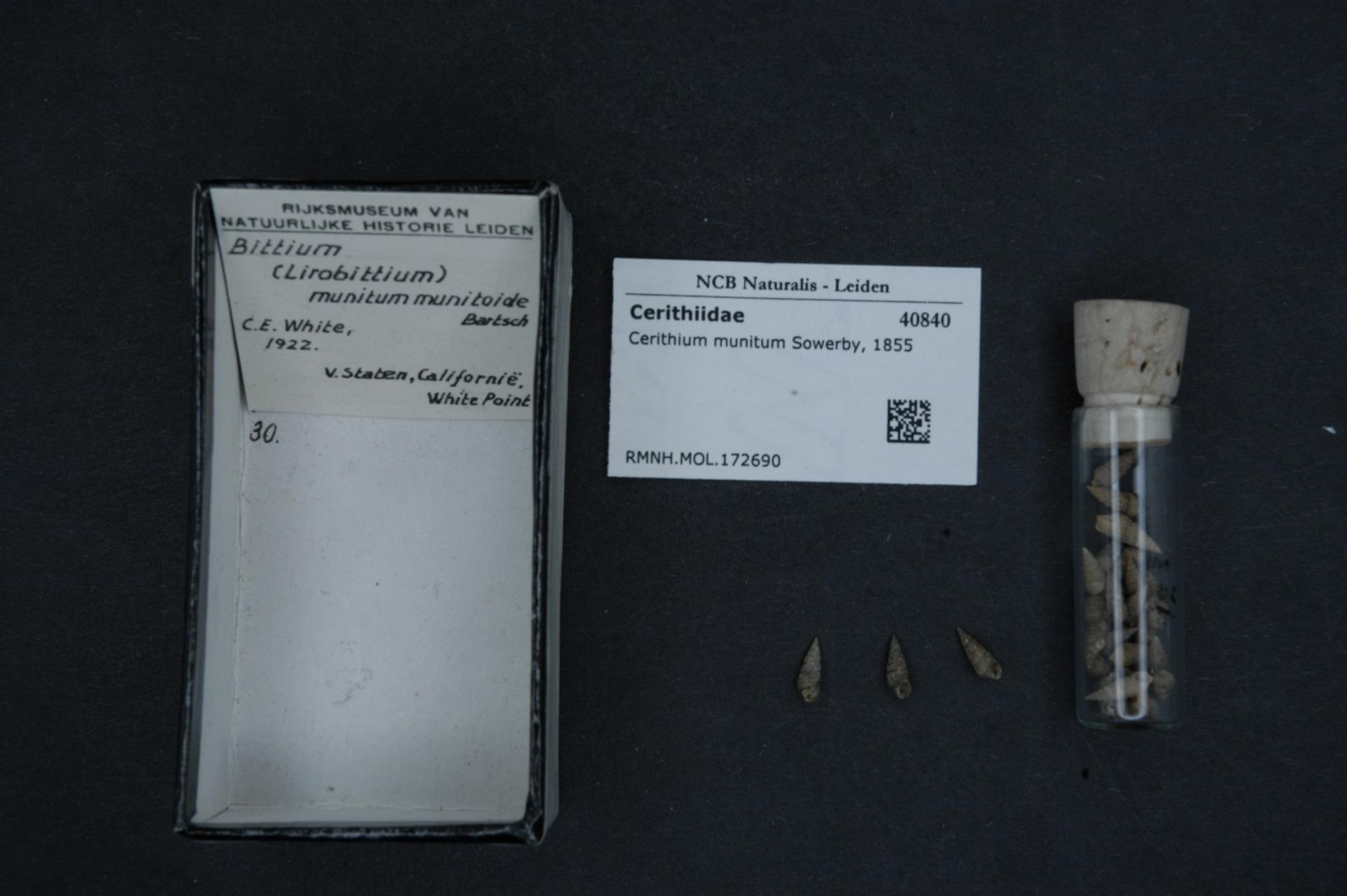
- Cerithium munitum Sowerby, 1855

Scientific classification
- Kingdom: Animalia
- Phylum: Mollusca
- Class: Gastropoda
- Subclass: Caenogastropoda
- Order: incertae sedis
- Family: Cerithiidae
- Genus: Cerithium
- Species: C. munitum

Binomial name
- Cerithium munitum G.B. Sowerby II, 1855

Synonyms
- Cerithium audouini Bayle, 1880; Cerithium boettgeri Icke & Martin, 1907; Cerithium dautzenbergi Vignal, 1902; Cerithium ickei Vignal, 1908; Cerithium proditum Bayle, 1880; Cerithium pyramidatum Hombron & Jacquinot, 1852; Cerithium sucaradjanum Martin, 1899; Cerithium talahabense Martin, 1899; Cerithium vandervlerki van der Vlerk, 1931

= Cerithium munitum =

Species of gastropod

Cerithium munitum is a species of sea snail, a marine gastropod mollusk in the family Cerithiidae, the ceriths.

== Description and Biology ==
Found at depths from subtidal to 10 m on reefs in sand and dead coral. Members of the order Neotaenioglossa are mostly gonochoric and broadcast spawners. Life cycle: Embryos develop into planktonic trochophore larvae and later into juvenile veligers before becoming fully grown adults.

== Distribution ==
The distribution of Cerithium munitum includes the Indo-Western Central Pacific.

- Indonesia
- Guam
