= Ludwig Karl Georg Pfeiffer =

German physician, botanist and conchologist

Ludwig Karl Georg Pfeiffer Dr. med.
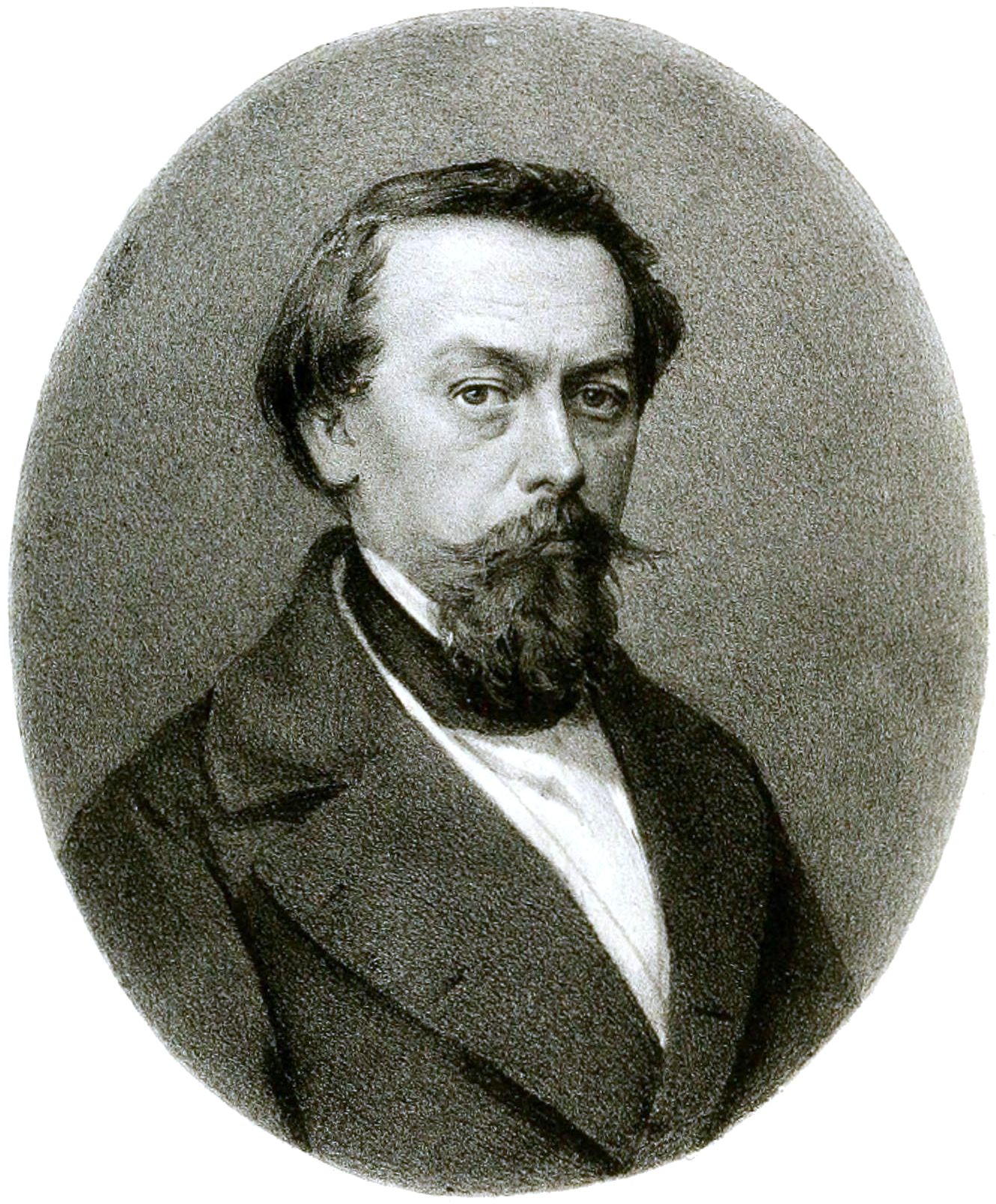
- Louis Pfeiffer in 1856
- Born: 4 July 1805; Cassel, Electorate of Hesse
- Died: 2 October 1877 (aged 72); Kassel, Hesse-Nassau, Kingdom of Prussia
- Education: University of Marburg, University of Göttingen
- Spouses: Louise Philippine von Nathusius (m. 1811; div. 1841) Wilhelmine Friederike Wagner (m. 1842)
- Relatives: Johann Jakob Pfeiffer (grandfather); Burkhard Wilhelm Pfeiffer (father); Carl Jonas Pfeiffer, Franz Georg Pfeiffer (uncles)
- Awards: 4th Class, Order of the Red Eagle
- Scientific career
- Fields: Medicine; Botany; Conchology
- Thesis: "De Phlegmatia alba dolente quaedam, adnexa huius morbi historia" (1825)
- Doctoral advisor: Georg Wilhelm Franz Wenderoth
- Author abbrev. (botany): Pfeiff.
- Author abbrev. (zoology): L. Pfeiffer

Signature
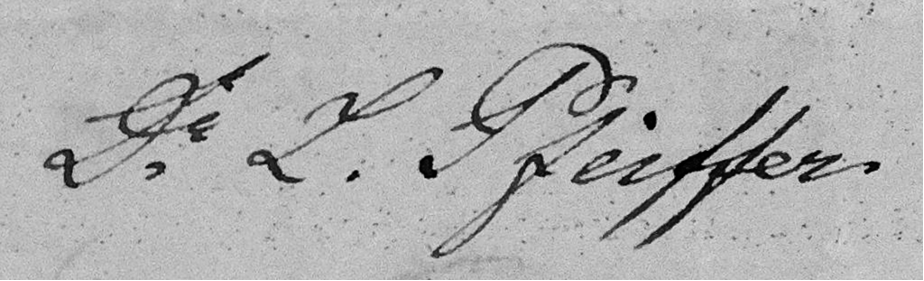

Ludwig Karl Georg Pfeiffer, also known as Louis Pfeiffer (4 July 1805 – 2 October 1877), was a German physician, botanist and conchologist.

== Early life, education and medical career ==
Pfeiffer was born in Cassel, the eldest son of the jurist Burkhard Wilhelm Pfeiffer and his wife Louise (née Harnier). Pfeiffer received his primary education in the Cassel Lyceum, where he distinguished himself academically, and by the age of fifteen was already at the top of his class. In 1820, political tensions forced his father to relocate the family to Lübeck, but Louis continued to excel, reaching the top of his class there as well. At the age of sixteen, Pfeiffer entered into university to study medicine, first at the University of Göttingen, and finally at the University of Marburg, where he studied under such prominent scientists as Georg Wilhelm Franz Wenderoth and Ernst Daniel August Bartels, graduating in 1825. He spent the next year in Paris and Berlin, continuing his education, and returned to Cassel in 1826, where he entered into general practice and obstetrics. During his short interlude in Kassel, Pfeiffer was engaged in many artistic pursuits, particularly musical ones, and his lyric baritone was remarked on often by his brother Carl's friend (and later, his brother-in-law) Louis Spohr. The Pfeiffer brothers performed often with Spohr and his singing groups, even pairing up to perform in the opera of Pietro von Abano that Carl had adapted and Spohr composed. At the outbreak of Polish rebellion of 1831 he took the position of staff surgeon at the Alexander-Hospital in Warsaw, lending support to the beleaguered Polish partisans. In addition to the war-wounded he treated at the hospital, he also took a special interest in caring for the many thousands who were stricken with cholera as a result of the upheaval cased by the conflict. In September 1831, the Polish rebels were forced to capitulate to the overwhelming Russian military force, but Pfeiffer had developed such a close feeling of kinship and support for the Poles that he refused to stay on and work with the Russians.

Pfeiffer's return to Cassel was overshadowed, however, by the untimely death of his elder brother Carl, who succumbed to the very same cholera that Louis worked so hard to fight in Poland. As a result of the outbreak of cholera across Prussia, Pfeiffer was kept in quarantine before he could enter Cassel, which prolonged his and his family's grief, until he was finally permitted to return home and bury his brother. Upon his return home, Pfeiffer undertook his first publication, a personal recollection of his experience entitled Erfahrungen über die Cholera, gesammelt in dem Hospital zu Warschau im Sommer 1831.

== Family ==
Pfeiffer was married twice. His first marriage was to Luise Philippine (née Nathusius, 2 September 1811 – 18 September 1891), daughter of the industrialist Johann Gottlob Nathusius. They were married on May 19, 1832, and divorced in 1841. This union produced three children, all of whom died young:

- Gottlob Wilhelm Richard Paul (13 April 1834 – 9 March 1835)
- Louise Marie Anna (5 January 1836 – 29 May 1840)
- Johanna Caroline Marie (25 October 1837 – 1 June 1840)

Pfeiffer married his second wife, Wilhelmine Friederike (née Wagner, 10 April 1823 – 26 June 1900), on October 9, 1842. Their marriage lasted until Pfeiffer's death, and produced six children:

- Wilhelm Conrad Hermann (30 September 1843 – 9 May 1883), a merchant in Spain, specializing in the trade of hazelnuts.
- Louis Hermann (6 December 1845 – 20 August 1887), an architect and public works supervisor in Frankfurt am Main.
- Richard Albert (30 November 1847 – 6 May 1906), a district judge in Rotenburg an der Fulda; married the daughter of high court judge Ludwig Moeli.
- Adolf Carl Gabriel (4 December 1850 – 1906), a Hauptmann in the 27th Nassau Field Artillery Regiment.
- Wilhelm Franz Carl (13 September 1852 – 19 January 1871)
- Rosalie Marianne Caroline Sophie Mathilde (22 February 1855 – 1925)

== Scientific career and later life ==
After his return to Cassel and his marriage, as well as the death of his eldest son, Pfeiffer had grown unhappy with his medical practice, finding the state of medical science at the time insufficient for his intellectual needs, and gave it up to focus on scientific studies and literary works, particularly in the fields of botany and conchology. His first scientific work, published in 1837, was a book cataloging and describing the various cactus species used in German gardens. It was well received, and as a result, he became known as "Kaktus-Pfeiffer". In 1839, Pfeiffer was sent to Cuba with Johannes Gundlach and Eduard Otto in order to study the flora, fauna, and natural history of the West Indies, and it was this experience that piqued his interest in mollusks, conchology, and malacology. The group explored other islands in the Caribbean, but the experience had to come to and end, as the extended absence from home, which coincided with the deaths of his two remaining children, caused a rift between Pfeiffer and his wife that led to their divorce almost immediately upon his return to Europe in 1841. After remarrying, Pfeiffer adopted a sedentary and academic lifestyle, focusing his energy on the specimens and data he had collected in Cuba, classifying more than 20 new genera and species of mollusks. He proved to be a prolific publisher, and expanded his interest from conchology to the botany that had been his first love, writing several treatises on the nature flora of Hesse and its surrounding regions, coedited with the esteemed botanist Johann Cassebeer. Since 1836, Pfeiffer had been a member of the Cassel Society for Natural history, and from 1837 a member of the German National Academy of Sciences Leopoldina and the Regensburg Botanical Society. In 1868, Pfeiffer and his colleagues Wilhelm Kobelt and Karl Ludwig Fridolin von Sandberger added a further membership with the founding of the German Malacozoological Society. In 1871, Pfeiffer's already failing health was dealt a blow with the death of his youngest son Wilhelm, only 19 years old, on the battlefield in France, one of innumerable casualties of the Franco-Prussian War. In 1874, the increasingly frail Louis Pfeiffer undertook a two-month journey to Catalonia, where his eldest son Hermann was in business as a merchant, and the trip appears to have been an uneventful one, despite conceding directly with the coup d'état that toppled the First Spanish Republic. In 1875, on the 50th anniversary of his doctorate, and the 70th anniversary of his birth, he was surprised by the medical faculty of the University of Marburg, who renewed his doctoral credentials. In addition to the renewal of his medical doctorate, he was also given an honorary doctorate in philosophy by the philosophy faculty, honoring a life spent in pursuit of knowledge. Pfeiffer was also awarded the Prussian Order of the Red Eagle, 4th class, in gratitude for scientific service to the nation. Ludwig Carl Georg Pfeiffer died of a lung infection on October 2, 1877.

=== Animals described ===
He named more than 20 new genera and species, some of which have become synonyms:

- Albinaria praeclara L. Pfeiffer, 1853
- Belgrandiella parreyssii L. Pfeiffer, 1841
- Bittiolum varium L. Pfeiffer, 1840
- Bourciera L. Pfeiffer, 1853
- Buccinum pusillum L. Pfeiffer, 1840 is a synonym of Astyris lunata Say, 1826
- Cerithium martinianum L. Pfeiffer, 1840 is a synonym of Rhinoclavis (Rhinoclavis) fasciata Bruguière, 1792
- Cerithium pallidum L. Pfeiffer, 1840 is a synonym of Bittiolum varium L. Pfeiffer, 1840
- Cerithium varium L. Pfeiffer, 1840 is a synonym of Bittiolum varium L. Pfeiffer, 1840
- Cyclotini L. Pfeiffer, 1853
- Diplommatinidae L. Pfeiffer, 1857
- Gonaxis prostratus L. Pfeiffer, 1856
- Glugea cladocera L. Pfeiffer 1895
- Gulella L. Pfeiffer, 1856
- Helix micans L. Pfeiffer, 1845 is a synonym of Pfeifferia micans Gray, 1853
- Hydrocena bridgesi L. Pfeiffer, 1850
- Hydrocena cattaroensis L. Pfeiffer, 1841
- Hydrocena cerea L. Pfeiffer, 1857
- Hydrocena cornea L. Pfeiffer, 1855
- Hydrocena exserta L. Pfeiffer, 1855
- Hydrocena navigatorum L. Pfeiffer, 1857
- Hydrocena obtusa L. Pfeiffer, 1855
- Hydrocena pyramis L. Pfeiffer, 1855
- Hydrocena solidula L. Pfeiffer, 1855
- Kaliella barrakporensis L. Pfeiffer, 1853
- Leptopoma L. Pfeiffer, 1847
- Limborelia exquisita L. Pfeiffer, 1855
- Lissachatina reticulata L. Pfeiffer, 1845
- Marginella pellucida L. Pfeiffer, 1840 is a synonym of Prunum pellucidum L. Pfeiffer, 1840
- Melampus cristatus L. Pfeiffer, 1854
- Melampus floridanus L. Pfeiffer, 1856
- Murex martinianus L. Pfeiffer, 1840 is a synonym of Pterynotus alatus Röding, 1798
- Natica livida L. Pfeiffer, 1840
- Nucula hartvigiana L. Pfeiffer in Dohrn, 1864
- Omphalotropis L. Pfeiffer, 1851
- Omphalotropis guamensis L. Pfeiffer, 1857
- Omphalotropis plicosa L. Pfeiffer, 1852
- Oreobba Codonodes L. Pfeiffer, 1847
- Palaina capillacea L. Pfeiffer, 1855
- Palaina macgillivrayi L. Pfeiffer, 1855
- Paludinella L. Pfeiffer, 1841
- Prunum pellucidum L. Pfeiffer, 1840
- Sculptaria L. Pfeiffer, 1855
- Sunetta (Sunettina) L. Pfeiffer, 1869 is a synonym of Sunetta Link, 1807
- Terebra maculosa L. Pfeiffer, 1840 is a synonym of Acus maculatus Linnaeus, 1758
- Theba macandrewiana L. Pfeiffer, 1853
- Truncatella californica L. Pfeiffer, 1857
- Truncatella ceylanica L. Pfeiffer, 1857
- Truncatella pulchella L. Pfeiffer, 1839
- Venus puella L. Pfeiffer, 1846 is a synonym of Anomalocardia puella L.Pfeiffer, 1846

=== Plants described by Pfeiffer ===
- Alziniana (Pfeiff. 1873) is a synonym for Alzatea (Ruiz & Pav. 1794)
- Cephalocereus (Pfeiff. 1838)
- Cuscutina (Pfeiff. 1846) is a synonym of Cuscuta (L. 1753)
- Discocactus (Pfeiff. 1837)
- Engelmannia (Pfeiff. 1845) is a synonym of Cuscuta (L. 1753)
- Epilinella (Pfeiff. 1845) is a synonym of Cuscuta (L. 1753)
- Gymnocampus (Pfeiff. 1874) is a synonym of Stylidiaceae (R. Br. 1810)
- Hosta (Pfeiff. 1874)
- Lepismium (Pfeiff. 1835)
- Terminthia (Pfeiff. 1876) is a synonym for Searsia (F.A. Barkley 1942)
- Cuscuta hassiaca (Pfeiff. 1843) is a synonym for Cuscuta suaveolens (Ser. 1840)
- Cuscuta schkuhriana (Pfeiff. 1845) is a synonym for Cuscuta europaea (L. 1753)
- Engelmannia migrans (Pfeiff. 1845) is a synonym for Cuscuta suaveolens (Ser. 1840)
- Epilinella cuscutoides (Pfeiff. 1845) is a synonym for Cuscuta epilinum (Weihe 1824)
- Verbascum ruderale (Pfeiff. 1845) is a synonym for Verbascum nigrum (L. 1753)

=== Plant life named after Pfeiffer ===
- Pfeiffera (Salm-Dyck 1845)
- Pfeifferago (Kuntze 1891) is a synonym for Codia (J.R.Forst. & G.Forst., 1775)
- Pfeifferia (Buching. 1846)
- Cactus pfeifferianus (Kuntze 1891) is a synonym for Coryphantha cornifera (Lem. 1868)
- Cereus pfeifferi (Pfeiff. 1837) is a synonym for Pilosocereus lanuginosus (Byles & G.D.Rowley 1957)
- Echinocactus pfeifferi (Seitz 1837) is a synonym for Ferocactus glaucescens (Britton & Rose 1922)
- Echinofossulocactus pfeifferii (Lawr. 1841) is a synonym for Ferocactus glaucescens
- Mammillaria pfeifferi (Schiedw. 1839) is a synonym for Mammillaria rhodantha (Link & Otto, 1829)
- Mammillaria pfeifferiana (de Vriese 1839) is a synonym for Coryphantha cornifera (Lem. 1868)

=== Marine life named after Pfeiffer ===
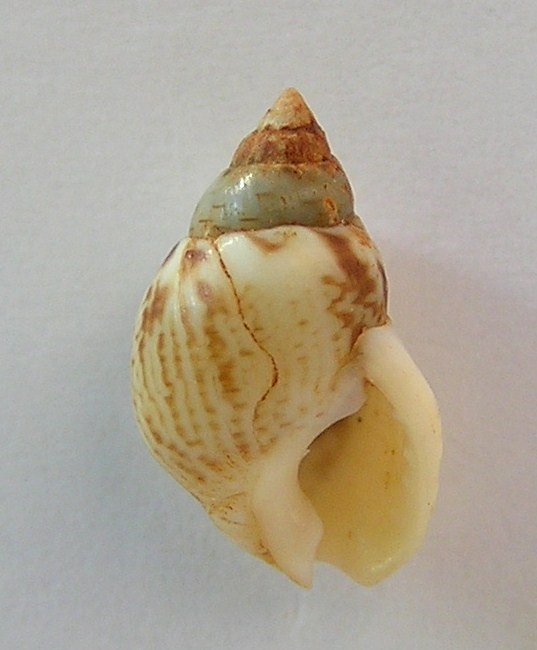
Nassarius pfeifferi, a nassa mud snail named in honor of Pfeiffer

In the course of time, 24 marine species have been named after Pfeiffer with the epithets pfeifferi, pfeifferae, pfeifferianus and pfeifferianum, many of which have become synonyms:

- Asperiscala pfeifferi (de Boury, 1913) is a synonym of Epitonium candeanum (d'Orbigny, 1842)
- Astarte pfeifferi (Philippi, 1849) is a synonym of Crassinella lunulata (Conrad, 1834)
- Azorica pfeifferae (Carter, 1876) is a synonym of Leiodermatium pfeifferae (Carter, 1876)
- Cerithium (Proclava) pfeifferi (Dunker, 1882) is a synonym of Rhinoclavis (Proclava) sordidula (Gould, 1849)
- Clava pfeifferi (Dunker, 1882) is a synonym of Rhinoclavis (Proclava) sordidula (Gould, 1849)
- Clava turritum var. pfeifferi (Dunker, 1882) is a synonym of Rhinoclavis (Proclava) sordidula (Gould, 1849)
- Cymatium pfeifferianum (Reeve, 1844)
- Engraulis pfeifferi Bleeker, 1852 is a synonym of Setipinna breviceps (Cantor, 1849)
- Eutritonium pfeifferianum Reeve is a synonym of Cymatium pfeifferianum (Reeve, 1844)
- Fusus pfeifferi Philippi, 1846 is a synonym of Pseudolatirus pfeifferi (Philippi, 1846)
- Gibberula pfeifferi Faber, 2004
- Laimodonta pfeifferi Dunker in Pfeiffer, 1860 is a synonym of Allochroa layardi (H. Adams & A. Adams, 1855)
- Leiodermatium pfeifferae (Carter, 1876)
- Nassarius pfeifferi (Philippi, 1844)
- Polynemus pfeifferi Bleeker, 1853 is a synonym of Filimanus xanthonema (Valenciennes, 1831)
- Pseudolatirus pfeifferi (Philippi, 1846)
- Reticutriton pfeifferianus (Reeve, 1844)
- Sargassum obovatum var. pfeifferae (Grunow) Grunow, 1915
- Sargassum pfeifferae Grunow, 1874 is a synonym of Sargassum obovatum var. pfeifferae (Grunow) Grunow, 1915
- Sodaliscala pfeifferi de Boury, 1913 is a synonym of Epitonium candeanum (d'Orbigny, 1842)
- Solen pfeifferi Dunker, 1862
- Tichogonia pfeifferi Dunker, 1853 is a synonym of Mytilopsis sallei (Récluz, 1849)
- Triton pfeifferianus Reeve, 1844 is a synonym of Reticutriton pfeifferianus (Reeve, 1844)
- Vertagus pfeifferi Dunker, 1882 is a synonym of Rhinoclavis (Proclava) sordidula (Gould, 1849)

== Bibliography ==
Partial list of publications:

- 1837 - Enumeratio diagnostica cactearum hucusque cognitarum. Berlin: L. Öhmigke.
- 1841-1846 - Symbolae ad historiam Heliceorum. Cassel: T. Fischeri.
- 1843 - Abbildung und Beschreibung blühender Cacteen. Cassel: T. Fischeri.
- 1846 - Die Gattungen Daudebardia, Simpulopsis, Vitrina und Succinea (Bauer et Raspe, Nuremberg, 1846). In: Küster H. C. et al. (eds.). Systematisches Conchylien Cabinet von Martini und Chemnitz, J. H. Casselis, 1(part. 11): 1-59, pls. 1–6.
- 1846 - Die gedeckelten Lungenschnecken (helicinacea et cyclostomacea) in Abbildungen nach der Natur. (deux volumes, Bauer et Raspe, Nuremberg, 1846).
  - volume 1
  - 1846 volume 2.
- Die Schnirkelschnecken (Gattung Helix) in Abbildungen nach der Natur, mit Beschreibungen (deux parties en un volume, Bauer et Raspe, Nuremberg, 1846) — ces trois derniers volumes font partis de Neues systematisches Conchylien-Cabinet de Friedrich Wilhelm Martini (1729–1778) et de Johann Hieronymus Chemnitz (1730-1800).
- 1847 - Flora von Niederhessen und Münden. Beschreibung aller im Gebiete wildwachsenden und im grossen angebauten Pflanzen. (T. Fischer, Cassel, 1847).
- 1848–1877 - Monographia heliceorum viventium, sistens descriptiones... omnium huius familiae generum et specierum... (huit volumes, F.A. Brockhaus, Leipzig, 1848 à 1877).
- 1854–1879 - Novitates conchologicae. Series I-V. Mollusca extramarina (cinq volumes, T. Fischer, Cassel, de 1854 à 1879).
  - 1854–1860. volume I.
  - 1861–1866. volume II.
  - 1867–1869. volume III.
  - 1870–1876. volume IV.
  - 1877–1879. volume V.
- 1852 - Conspectus Cyclostomaceorum emendatus et auctus. Pneumonopomorum monographiae prodromus.
- 1855 - Catalogue of phanero-pneumona or terrestrial operculated mollusca in the collection of the British Museum (Woodfall et Kinder, Londres, 1855).
- 1855 - Catalogue of Pulmonata or air-breathing Mollusca, in the collection of the British Museum. part I.
- 1856 - Monographia auriculaceorum viventium. Sistens descriptiones systematicas et criticas omnium hujus familiae generum et specierum hodie cognitarum, nec non fossilium enumeratione. Accedente proserpinaceorum necnon generis Truncatellae historia. (T. Fischer, Cassel, 1856).
- 1857 - Catalogue of Auriculidae. Proserpinidae and Truncatellidae in the collection of the British Museum (Taylor et Francis, 1857). Link
- 1858, 1865, 1876 - Monographia pneumonopomorum viventium.
  - 1852. Monographia pneumonopomorum viventium ... accedente fossilium enumeratione (1852) (copy 2)
  - 1858. supplement 1.
  - 1865. supplement 2.
  - 1876. supplement 3.
- 1862 - Die Gattung Cylindrella Pfr. in Abbildungen nach der Natur mit Beschreibungen. Link
- 1869 - Die Familie der Venusmuscheln, Veneracea, nebst einen Anhange enthaltend die Chemnitz'schen Lucinen, Galaten und Corbis (Bauer et Raspe, Nuremberg, 1869) — édité dans la série Systematisches Conchylien-Cabinet von Martini und Chemnitz.
- Synonymia botanica locupletissima generum, sectionum vel subgenerum ad finem anni 1858 promulgatorum (deux volumes, T. Fischer, Cassel, 1870–1874).
- 1873–1874 - Nomenclator botanicus. Nominum ad finem anni 1858 publici juris factorum, classes, ordines, tribus, familias, divisiones, genera, subgenera vel sectiones designantium enumeratio alphabetica. Adjectis auctoribus, temporibus, locis systematicis apud varios, notis literariis atque etymologicis et synonymis (deux tomes en quatre volumes, T. Fischer, Cassel, 1873–1874).
  - 1873 volume 1
- 1881 - Nomenclator heliceorum viventium quo continentur nomina omnium hujus familiae generum et specierum hodie cognitarum disposita ex affinitate naturali (édition posthume, T. Fischer, Cassel, 1881).
