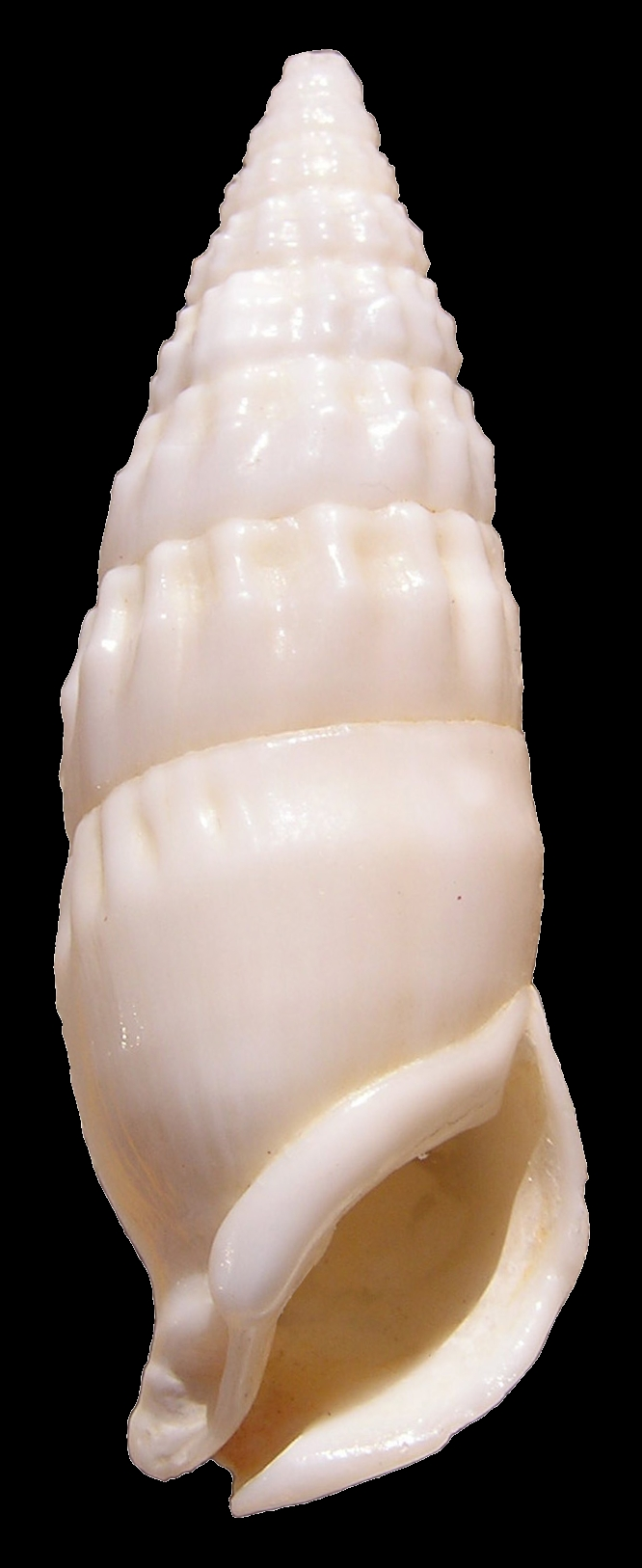
- Apertural view of a shell of Rhinoclavis vertagus.

Scientific classification
- Kingdom: Animalia
- Phylum: Mollusca
- Class: Gastropoda
- Subclass: Caenogastropoda
- Order: incertae sedis
- Family: Cerithiidae
- Subfamily: Cerithiinae
- Genus: Rhinoclavis; Swainson, 1840

Species
- See text

Synonyms
- Cerithium (Semivertagus) Cossmann, 1889; Clava Fabricius, 1823; Ochetoclava Woodring, 1928; Vertagus Schumacher, 1817

= Rhinoclavis =

Genus of gastropods

Rhinoclavis is a genus of sea snails, marine gastropod molluscs in the family Cerithiidae, the ceriths.

This species is of medium to large size, measuring between 2 and 3½ inches. It has a sturdy and thick body with a regular conical spire that is very high and turreted. The whorls are almost flat, and the suture is only weakly incised. The almond-shaped aperture has a slightly tapered lip, but it is never sharp.

== Occurrence ==
Species in this genus occur throughout the Indo-Pacific, the Marshall Islands, the Solomon Islands, the Philippines, Australia and the Gulf of Aqaba. These deposit-feeding gastropods can be found in clearer shallow water in coral reefs, preferring sandy to muddy bottoms.

== Species ==
According to the World Register of Marine Species (WORMS), Rhinoclavis consists of the following subgenera and species:

- Rhinoclavis alexandri (Tomlin, 1923)
- Rhinoclavis pilsbryi (Kuroda & Habe, 1961)
- Rhinoclavis taniae Cecalupo, 2008
- Rhinoclavis (Longicerithium) Houbrick, 1978
  - Rhinoclavis (Longicerithium) longicaudatum (A. Adams & Reeve, 1850)
- Rhinoclavis (Proclava) Thiele, 1929
  - Rhinoclavis (Proclava) kochi (Philippi, 1848)
  - Rhinoclavis (Proclava) sordidula (Gould, 1849)
- Rhinoclavis (Rhinoclavis) Swainson, 1840
  - Rhinoclavis (Rhinoclavis) articulata (A. Adams & Reeve, 1850)
  - Rhinoclavis (Rhinoclavis) aspera (Linnaeus, 1758)
  - Rhinoclavis (Rhinoclavis) bituberculata (G.B. Sowerby II, 1866)
  - Rhinoclavis (Rhinoclavis) brettinghami Cernohorsky, 1974
  - Rhinoclavis (Rhinoclavis) diadema Houbrick, 1978
  - Rhinoclavis (Rhinoclavis) fasciata (Bruguière, 1792)
  - Rhinoclavis (Rhinoclavis) sinensis (Gmelin, 1791)
- Rhinoclavis superbus Poppe & Tagaro, 2026
  - Rhinoclavis (Rhinoclavis) vertagus (Linnaeus, 1767)

Species brought into synonymy

- Rhinoclavis aluco (Linnaeus, 1758): synonym of Pseudovertagus aluco (Linnaeus, 1758)
- Rhinoclavis articulata (A. Adams & Reeve, 1850): synonym of Rhinoclavis (Rhinoclavis) articulata (A. Adams & Reeve, 1850)
- Rhinoclavis asper: synonym of Rhinoclavis (Rhinoclavis) aspera (Linnaeus, 1758)
- Rhinoclavis aspera (Linnaeus, 1758): synonym of Rhinoclavis (Rhinoclavis) aspera (Linnaeus, 1758)
- Rhinoclavis bituberculata (G.B. Sowerby II, 1866): synonym of Rhinoclavis (Rhinoclavis) bituberculata (G.B. Sowerby II, 1866)
- Rhinoclavis brettinghami Cernohorsky, 1974: synonym of Rhinoclavis (Rhinoclavis) brettinghami Cernohorsky, 1974
- Rhinoclavis diadema Houbrick, 1978: synonym of Rhinoclavis (Rhinoclavis) diadema Houbrick, 1978
- Rhinoclavis fasciata (Bruguière, 1792): synonym of Rhinoclavis (Rhinoclavis) fasciata (Bruguière, 1792)
- Rhinoclavis mountfordae Cotton, 1964: synonym of Rhinoclavis (Rhinoclavis) fasciata (Bruguière, 1792)
- Rhinoclavis nobilis (Reeve, 1855): synonym of Pseudovertagus nobilis (Reeve, 1855)
- Rhinoclavis obeliscus (Bruguière, 1792): synonym of Rhinoclavis (Rhinoclavis) sinensis (Gmelin, 1791)
- Rhinoclavis pulchra (A. Adams in G.B. Sowerby II, 1855): synonym of Rhinoclavis (Rhinoclavis) brettinghami Cernohorsky, 1974
- Rhinoclavis sordidula (Gould, 1849): synonym of Rhinoclavis (Proclava) sordidula (Gould, 1849)
