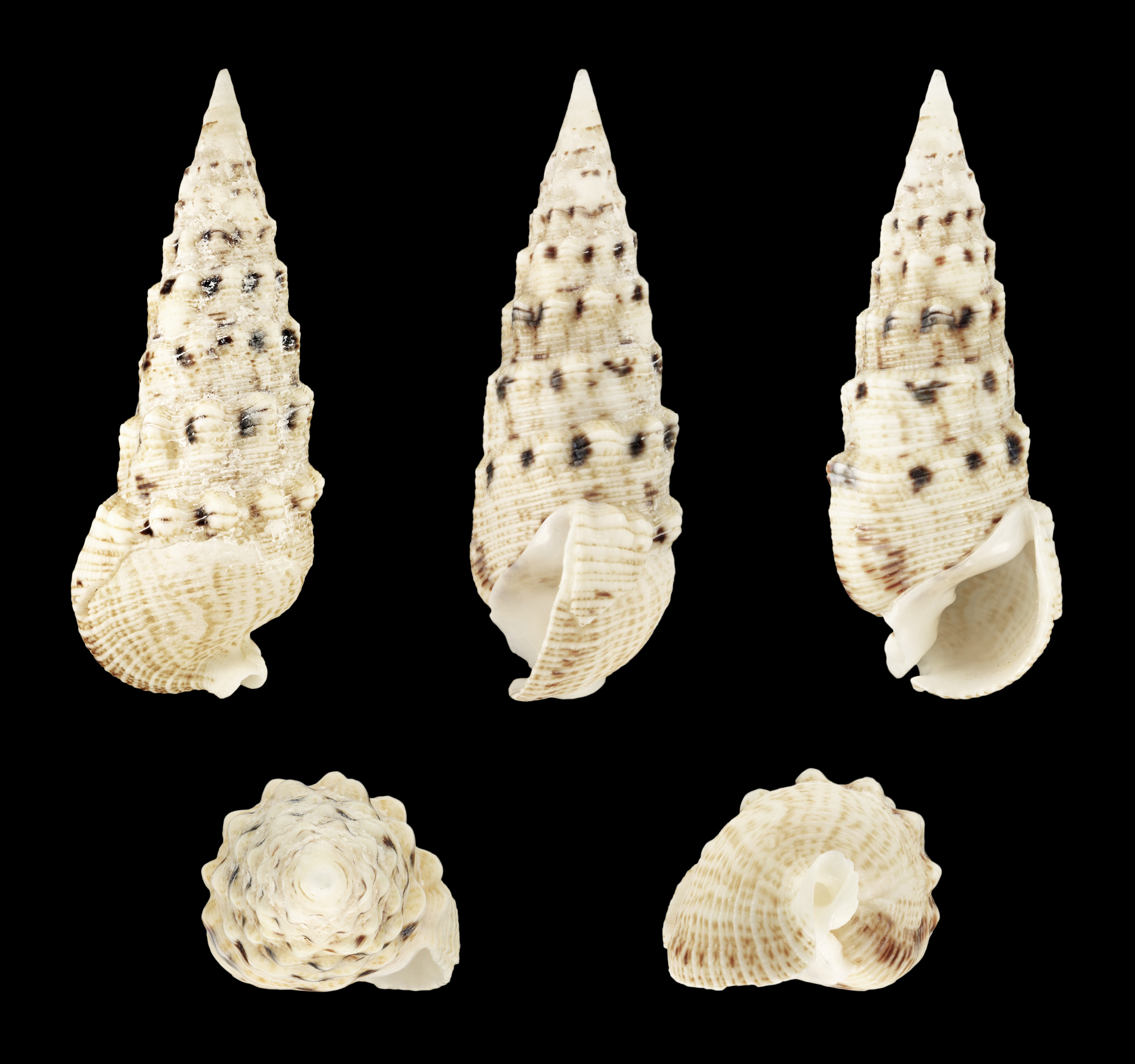

Scientific classification
- Kingdom: Animalia
- Phylum: Mollusca
- Class: Gastropoda
- Subclass: Caenogastropoda
- Order: incertae sedis
- Family: Cerithiidae
- Genus: Rhinoclavis
- Species: R. brettinghami

Binomial name
- Rhinoclavis brettinghami Cernohorsky, 1974

Synonyms
- Cerithium (Vertagus) pulchrum A. Adams in G.B. Sowerby II, 1855; Cerithium pulchrum A. Adams in G.B. Sowerby II, 1855; Clava pulchra (A. Adams in G.B. Sowerby II, 1855); Rhinoclavis brettinghami Cernohorsky, 1974; Rhinoclavis pulchra (A. Adams in G.B. Sowerby II, 1855); Vertagus pulcher (A. Adams in G.B. Sowerby II, 1855)

= Rhinoclavis brettinghami =

Species of gastropod

Rhinoclavis brettinghami is a species of sea snail, a marine gastropod mollusk in the family Cerithiidae.
