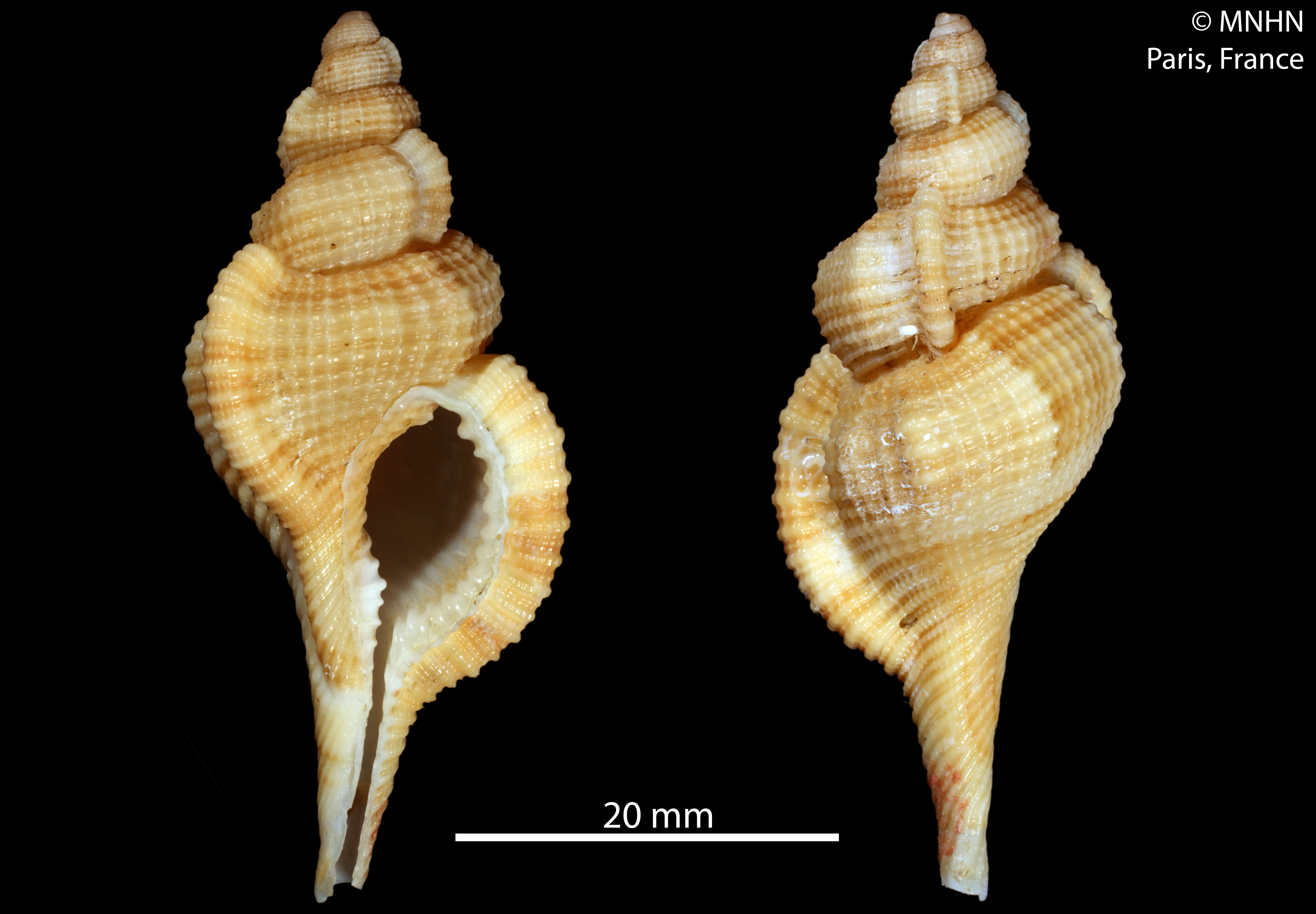
- Shell of Reticutriton pfeifferianus

Scientific classification
- Kingdom: Animalia
- Phylum: Mollusca
- Class: Gastropoda
- Subclass: Caenogastropoda
- Order: Littorinimorpha
- Superfamily: Tonnoidea
- Family: Cymatiidae
- Genus: Reticutriton; Habe & Kosuge, 1966

Type species
- Triton pfeifferianus Reeve, 1844

Synonyms
- Cymatium (Reticutriton) Habe & Kosuge, 1966

= Reticutriton =

Genus of gastropods

Reticutriton is a genus of predatory sea snails, marine gastropod mollusks in the family Cymatiidae.

== Species ==
The genus Reticutriton contains the following species:

- † Reticutriton carlottae (Ferreira & da Cunha, 1957)
- † Reticutriton elsmerensis (English, 1914)
- Reticutriton lineatus (Broderip, 1833)
- Reticutriton pfeifferianus (Reeve, 1844)
