= Rhinoclavis diadema =

Scientific classification
- Kingdom: Animalia
- Phylum: Mollusca
- Class: Gastropoda
- Subclass: Caenogastropoda
- Order: incertae sedis
- Family: Cerithiidae
- Genus: Rhinoclavis
- Species: R. diadema

Binomial name
- Rhinoclavis diadema Houbrick, 1978

Synonyms
- Cerithium nitidum Hombron & Jacquinot, 1854; Rhinoclavis diadema Houbrick, 1978

Species of gastropod

Rhinoclavis diadema is a species of sea snail, a marine gastropod mollusk in the family Cerithiidae.
