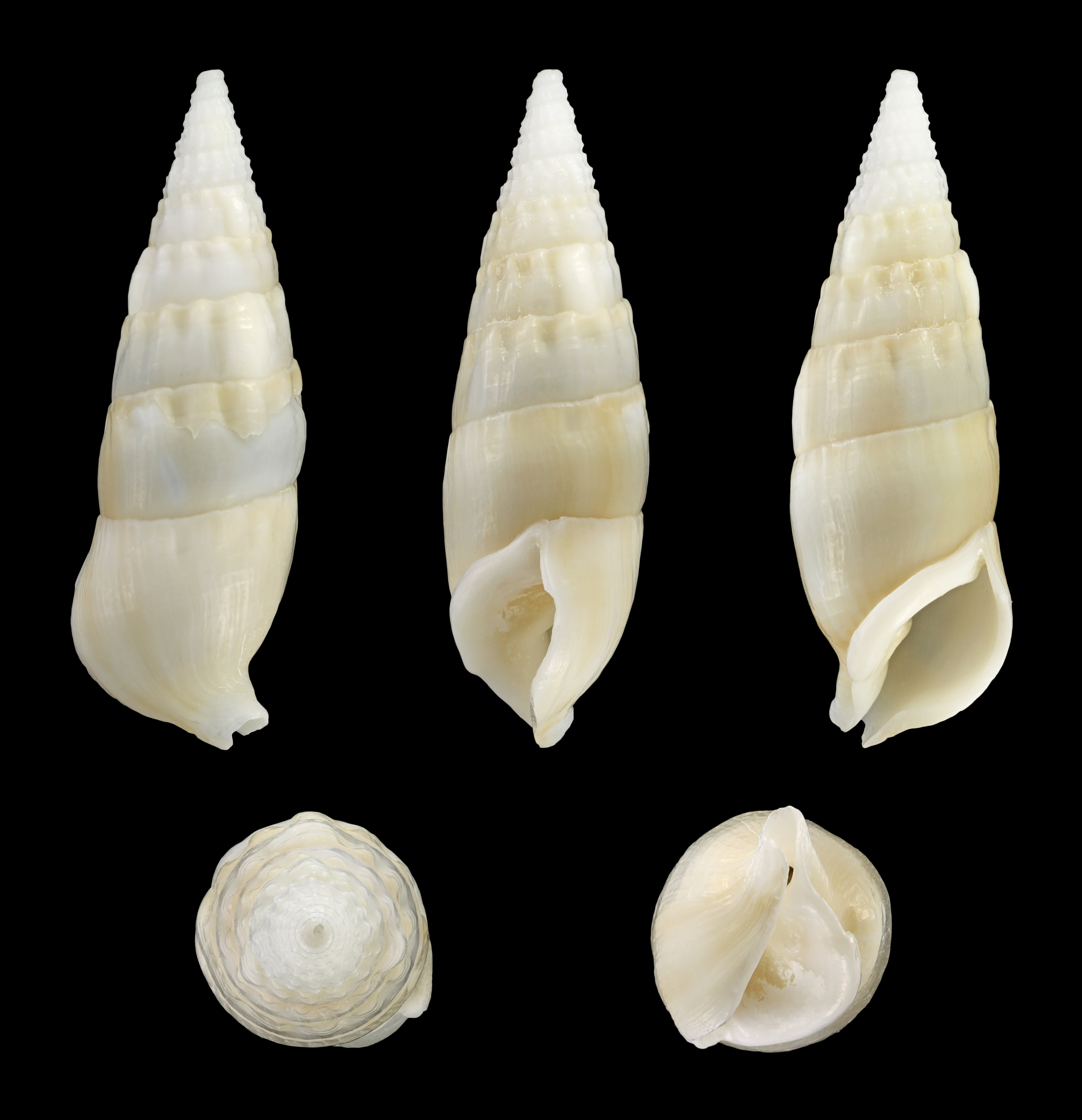
- A Shell of Rhinoclavis vertagus.

Scientific classification
- Kingdom: Animalia
- Phylum: Mollusca
- Class: Gastropoda
- Subclass: Caenogastropoda
- Family: Cerithiidae
- Genus: Rhinoclavis
- Species: R. vertagus

Binomial name
- Rhinoclavis vertagus (Linnaeus, 1767)

Synonyms
- Cerithium (Rhinoclavis) vertagus (Linnaeus, 1767) (chresonym); Cerithium despectum Perry, 1811 (original combination); Cerithium vertagus (Linnaeus, 1767) (chresonym); Clava varia Humphrey, 1797; Clava vertagus (Linnaeus, 1767) (chresonym); Clava volvax Humphrey, 1797; Rhinoclavis (Rhinoclavis) vertagus (Linnaeus, 1767) · accepted, alternate representation; Murex vertagus Linnaeus, 1767; Strombus carminatus Röding, 1798; Vertagus vertagus (Linnaeus, 1767) (chresonym); Vertagus vulgaris ^{Schumacher, 1817}

= Rhinoclavis vertagus =

Common creeper

Species of gastropod

Rhinoclavis vertagus, commonly known as the common creeper, is a species of sea snail, a marine gastropod mollusk in the family Cerithiidae, the ceriths. R. vertagus is most commonly found in intertidal sand flats.

== Description ==
R. vertagus has a cone-shaped shell most commonly bearing white, grey, and brown colors.The length of the shell varies between 40 mm and 80 mm. Members of the order Neotaenioglossa are mostly gonochoric and broadcast spawners. Embryos develop into planktonic trocophore larvae and later into juvenile veligers before becoming fully grown adults.

They are collected mainly for their shells, though occasionally eaten.

== Distribution ==
This species occurs in Australia, Philippines, and in the Indo-west Pacific from east Africa to Vanuatu as a whole.
