= Rhinoclavis bituberculata =

Scientific classification
- Kingdom: Animalia
- Phylum: Mollusca
- Class: Gastropoda
- Subclass: Caenogastropoda
- Order: incertae sedis
- Family: Cerithiidae
- Genus: Rhinoclavis
- Species: R. bituberculata

Binomial name
- Rhinoclavis bituberculata (G.B. Sowerby II, 1866)

Synonyms
- Cerithium (Vertagus) bituberculatum (G.B. Sowerby II, 1866); Cerithium (Vertagus) semigranosum Lamarck, 1822; Cerithium bituberculatum (G.B. Sowerby II, 1866); Cerithium cordigerum Bayle, 1880; Cerithium semigranosum Lamarck, 1822; Murex semigranosus Wood, 1825; Rhinoclavis bituberculata (G.B. Sowerby II, 1866); Vertagus bituberculatus G.B. Sowerby II, 1866; Vertagus semigranosus (Lamarck, 1822)

Species of gastropod

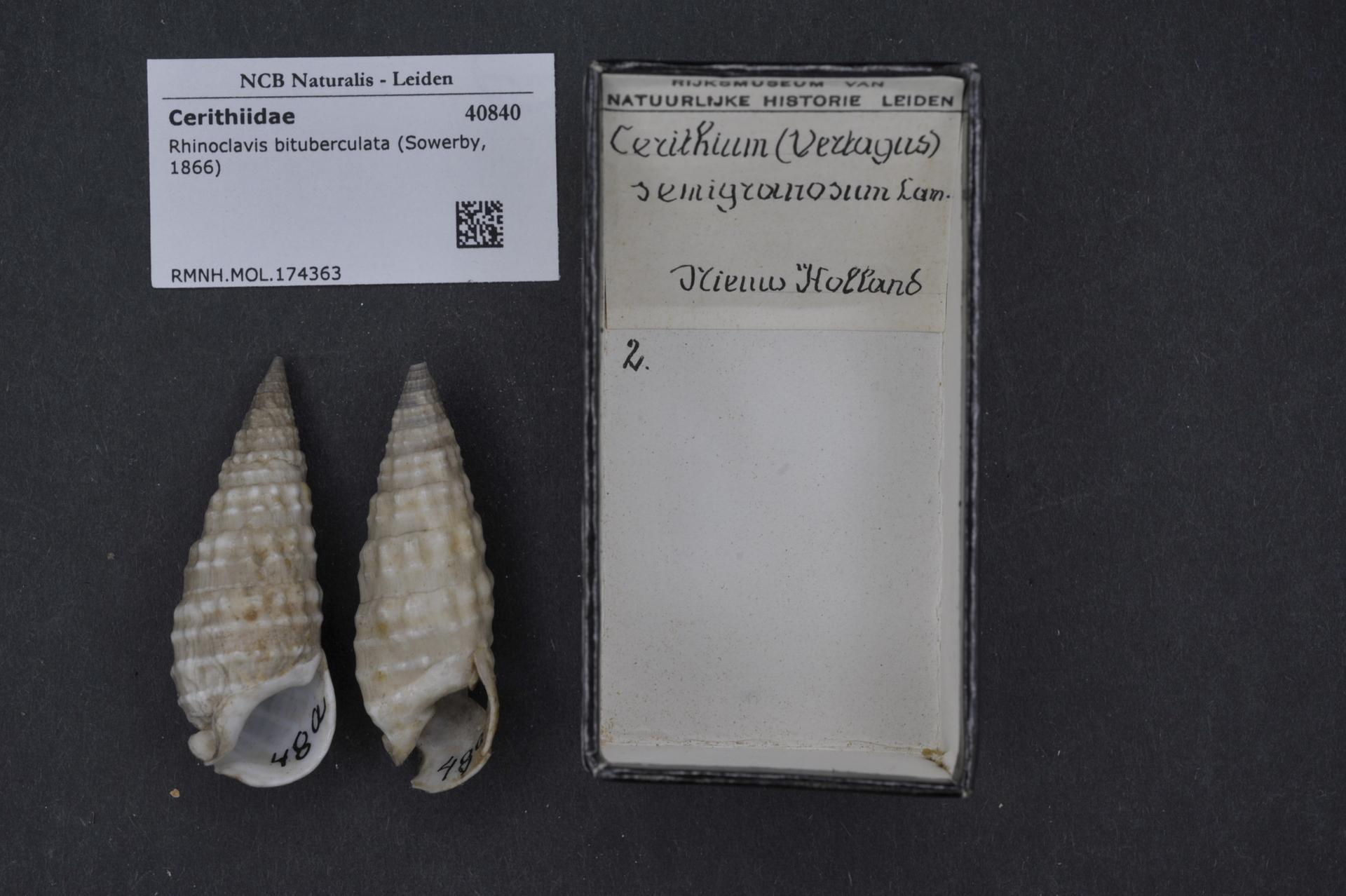
Rhinoclavis bituberculata shells

Rhinoclavis bituberculata is a species of sea snail, a marine gastropod mollusk in the family Cerithiidae.==References==
