= Reticutriton lineatus =

Scientific classification
- Kingdom: Animalia
- Phylum: Mollusca
- Class: Gastropoda
- Subclass: Caenogastropoda
- Order: Littorinimorpha
- Family: Cymatiidae
- Genus: Reticutriton
- Species: R. lineatus

Binomial name
- Reticutriton lineatus (Broderip, 1833)

Synonyms
- Triton lineatus Broderip, 1833

Species of gastropod

Reticutriton lineatus is a species of predatory sea snail, a marine gastropod mollusk in the family Cymatiidae.
