= Rhinoclavis taniae =

Scientific classification
- Kingdom: Animalia
- Phylum: Mollusca
- Class: Gastropoda
- Subclass: Caenogastropoda
- Order: incertae sedis
- Family: Cerithiidae
- Genus: Rhinoclavis
- Species: R. taniae

Binomial name
- Rhinoclavis taniae Cecalupo, 2008

Species of gastropod

Rhinoclavis taniae is a species of sea snail, a marine gastropod mollusk in the family Cerithiidae, the ceriths.
