= Rhinoclavis alexandri =

Scientific classification
- Kingdom: Animalia
- Phylum: Mollusca
- Class: Gastropoda
- Subclass: Caenogastropoda
- Order: incertae sedis
- Family: Cerithiidae
- Genus: Rhinoclavis
- Species: R. alexandri

Binomial name
- Rhinoclavis alexandri (Tomlin, 1923)

Synonyms
- Cerithium alexandri Tomlin, 1923

Species of gastropod

Rhinoclavis alexandri is a species of sea snail, a marine gastropod mollusk in the family Cerithiidae.

== Distribution ==
This marine species occurs off Natal, South Africa.
