= Pseudolatirus leucostriatus =

Scientific classification
- Kingdom: Animalia
- Phylum: Mollusca
- Class: Gastropoda
- Subclass: Caenogastropoda
- Order: Neogastropoda
- Family: Fasciolariidae
- Genus: Pseudolatirus
- Species: P. leucostriatus

Binomial name
- Pseudolatirus leucostriatus Kosuge, 1979

Species of gastropod

Pseudolatirus leucostriatus is a species of sea snail, a marine gastropod mollusk in the family Fasciolariidae, the spindle snails, the tulip snails and their allies.
