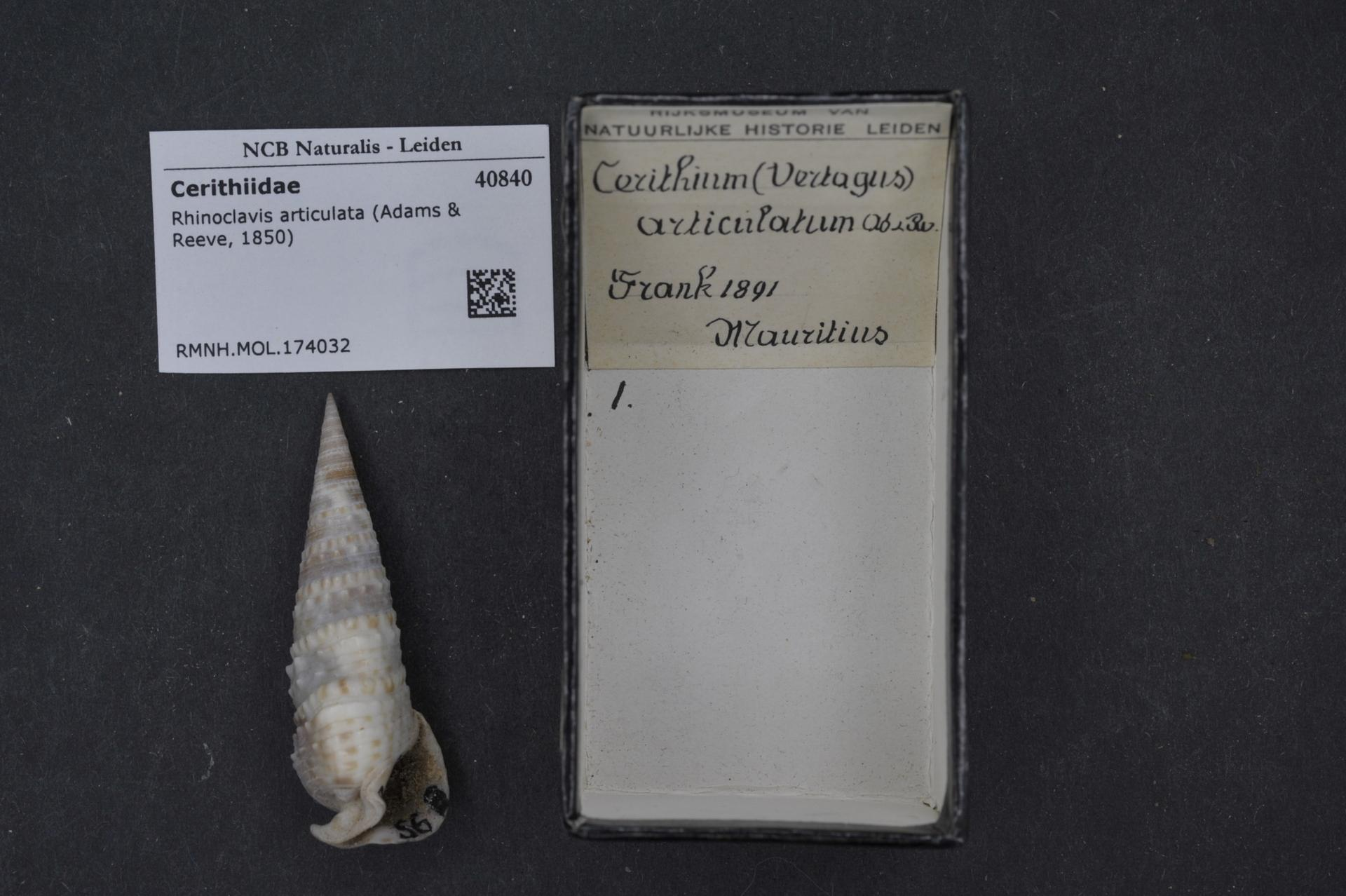
- Rhinoclavis articulata

Scientific classification
- Kingdom: Animalia
- Phylum: Mollusca
- Class: Gastropoda
- Subclass: Caenogastropoda
- Order: incertae sedis
- Family: Cerithiidae
- Genus: Rhinoclavis
- Species: R. articulata

Binomial name
- Rhinoclavis articulata (A. Adams & Reeve, 1850)

Synonyms
- Cerithium (Vertagus) articulatum A. Adams & Reeve, 1850; Cerithium (Vertagus) attenuatum var. brevicandatum Odhner, 1917; Cerithium acutinodulosum E.A. Smith, 1884; Cerithium articulatum A. Adams & Reeve, 1850; Clava articulata (A. Adams & Reeve, 1850); Ochetoclava articulata (A. Adams & Reeve, 1850); Ochetoclava pilsbryi Kuroda & Habe, 1961; Rhinoclavis articulata (A. Adams & Reeve, 1850); Vertagus articulatus (A. Adams & Reeve, 1850); Vertagus graniferus Pease, 1861; Vertagus seminudus G.B. Sowerby II, 1866

= Rhinoclavis articulata =

Species of gastropod

Rhinoclavis articulata is a species of sea snail, a marine gastropod mollusk in the family Cerithiidae.
