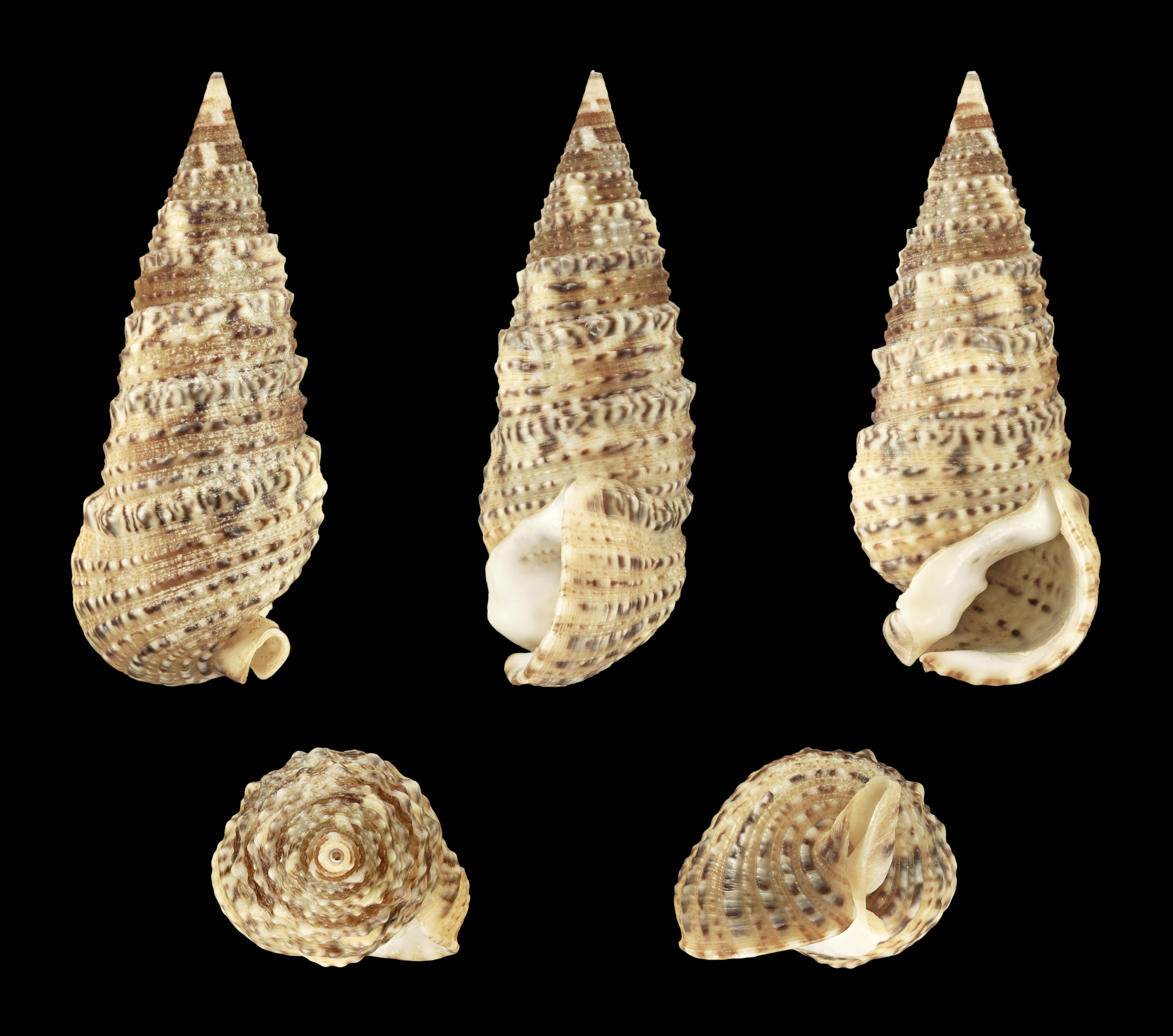
- A shell of Rhinoclavis sinensis

Scientific classification
- Kingdom: Animalia
- Phylum: Mollusca
- Class: Gastropoda
- Subclass: Caenogastropoda
- Order: incertae sedis
- Family: Cerithiidae
- Genus: Rhinoclavis
- Species: R. sinensis

Binomial name
- Rhinoclavis sinensis (Gmelin, 1791)

Synonyms
- Cerithium (Aluco) obeliscus (Bruguière, 1792); Cerithium (Rhinoclavis) cedonulli G.B. Sowerby II, 1855; Cerithium (Vertagus) sinensis (Gmelin, 1791); Cerithium cedonulli G.B. Sowerby II, 1855; Cerithium obeliscus (Bruguière, 1792); Cerithium obeliscus Bruguière, 1792; Clava (Clava) sinensis (Gmelin, 1791); Clava obeliscus (Bruguière, 1792); Clava sinensis (Gmelin, 1791); Murex obeliscus Bruguière, 1792; Murex sinensis Gmelin, 1791; Rhinoclavis obeliscus (Bruguière, 1792); Rhinoclavis sinensis (Gmelin, 1791); Strombus muricatus Röding, 1798; Vertagus cedonulli (G.B. Sowerby II, 1855); Vertagus chinensis Dunker, 1882; Vertagus obeliscus (Bruguière, 1792)

= Rhinoclavis sinensis =

Species of gastropod

Rhinoclavis sinensis is a species of sea snail, a marine gastropod mollusc in the family Cerithiidae.

== Distribution ==
Gulf of Aden, Socotra, Somalia, Arabian Sea, Gulf of Oman, and the Persian Gulf.
