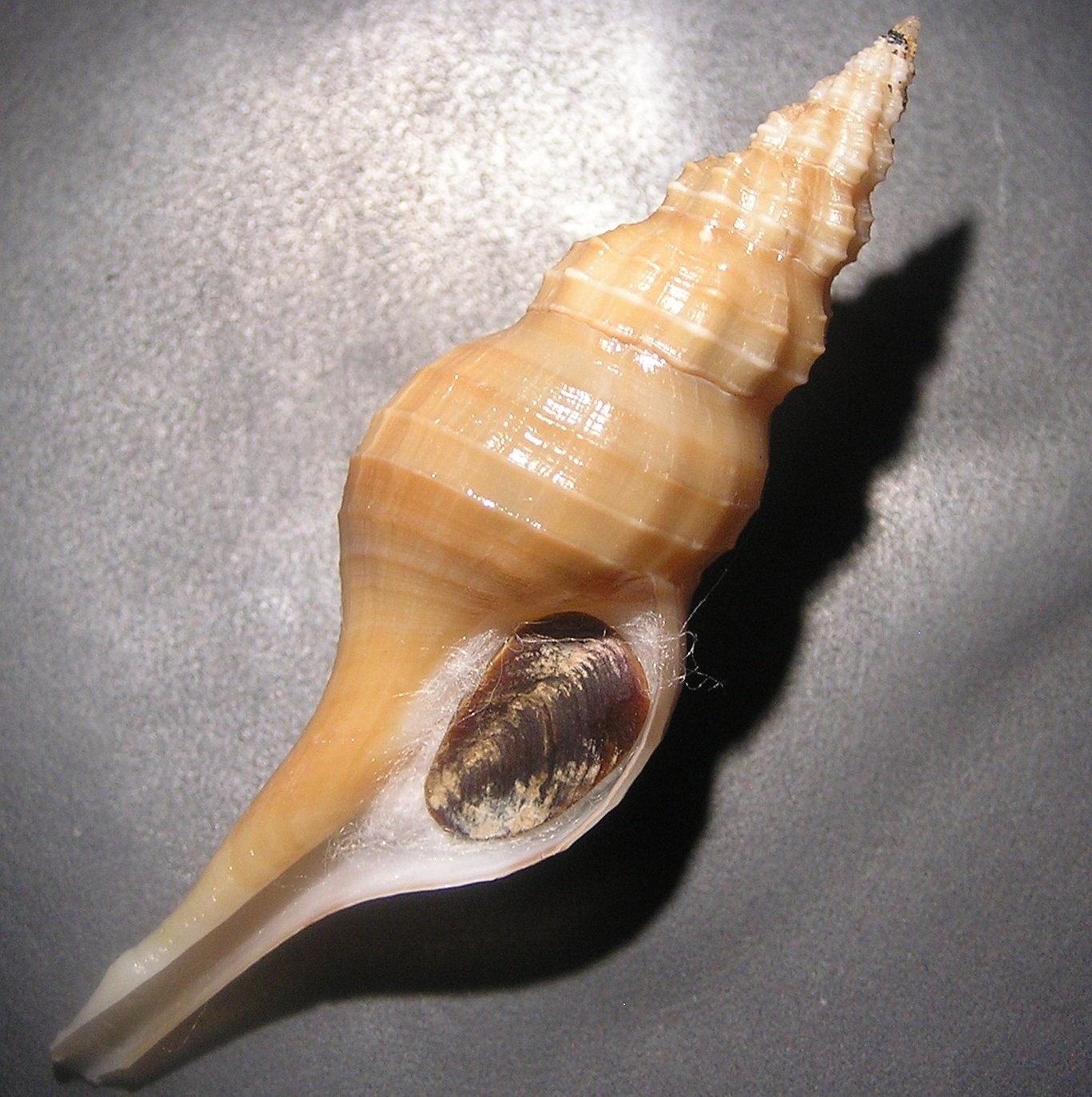

Scientific classification
- Kingdom: Animalia
- Phylum: Mollusca
- Class: Gastropoda
- Subclass: Caenogastropoda
- Order: Neogastropoda
- Family: Fasciolariidae
- Genus: Pseudolatirus
- Species: P. discrepans

Binomial name
- Pseudolatirus discrepans Kuroda & Habe, 1961

Synonyms
- Latirus (Pseudolatirus) discrepans Kuroda, T. & T. Habe, 1961

= Pseudolatirus discrepans =

Species of gastropod

Pseudolatirus discrepans is a species of sea snail, a marine gastropod mollusc in the family Fasciolariidae, the spindle snails, the tulip snails and their allies.

== Description ==
The shell size varies between 40 mm and 80 mm.

== Distribution ==
This species is found in the seas along the Philippines and South West Japan.
