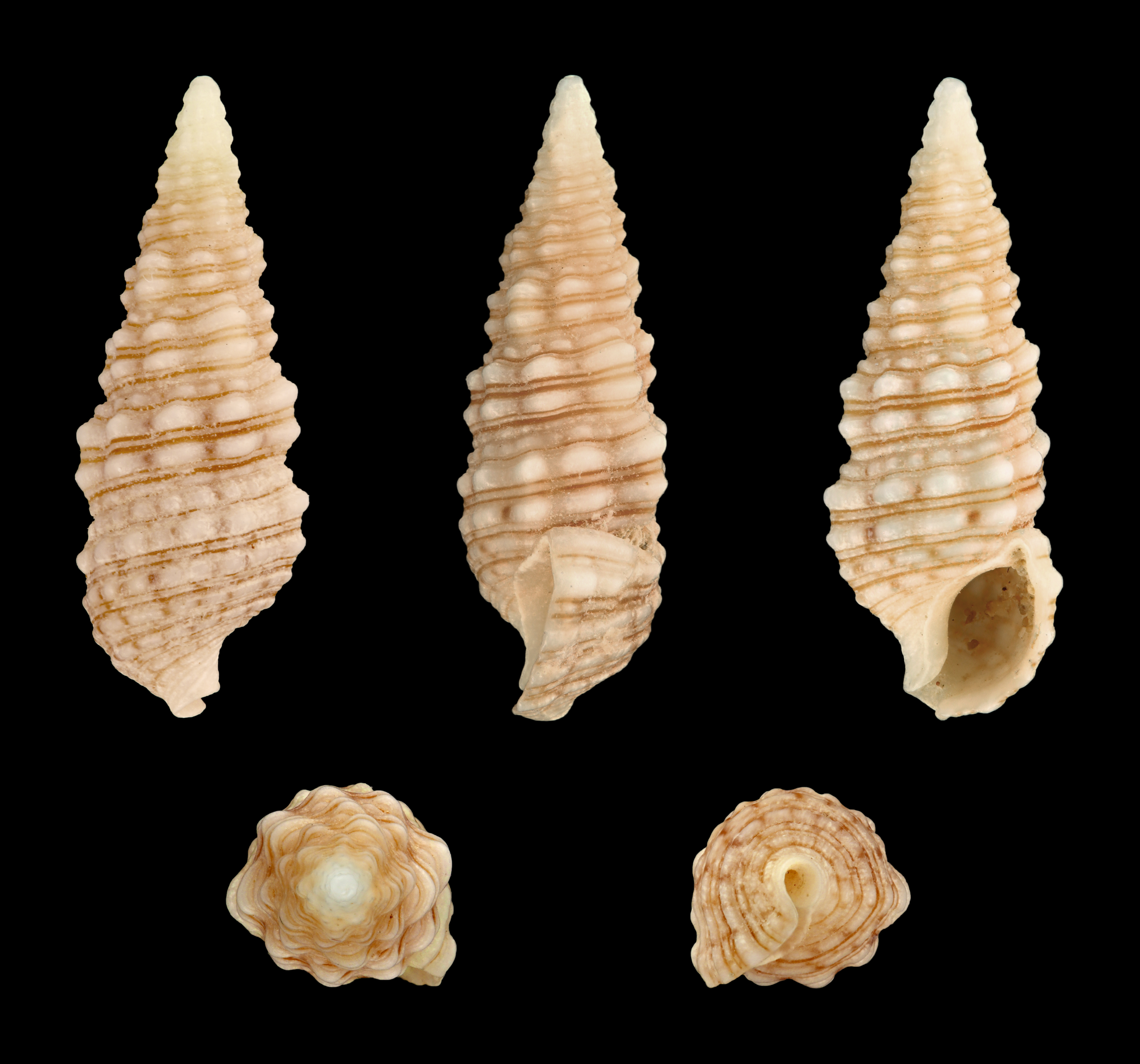

Scientific classification
- Kingdom: Animalia
- Phylum: Mollusca
- Class: Gastropoda
- Subclass: Caenogastropoda
- Order: incertae sedis
- Family: Cerithiidae
- Genus: Rhinoclavis
- Species: R. kochi

Binomial name
- Rhinoclavis kochi (Philippi, 1848)

Synonyms
- Cerithium (Proclava) kochi Philippi, 1848; Cerithium (Rhinoclavis) kochi Philippi, 1848; Cerithium (Vertagus) kochi Philippi, 1848; Cerithium (Vertagus) recurvum G.B. Sowerby II, 1855; Cerithium kochi Philippi, 1848; Cerithium recurvum G.B. Sowerby II, 1855; Cerithium subulatum Lamarck, 1822; Clava (Clava) kochi (Philippi, 1848); Clava (Proclava) kochi (Philippi, 1848); Rhinoclavis (Ochetoclava) kochi (Philippi, 1848); Rhinoclavis kochi (Philippi, 1848); Vertagus kochi (Philippi, 1848); Vertagus kochi var. polita Preston, 1908; Vertagus recurvus (G.B. Sowerby II, 1855)

= Rhinoclavis kochi =

Species of gastropod

Rhinoclavis kochi is a species of sea snail, a marine gastropod mollusk in the family Cerithiidae.
