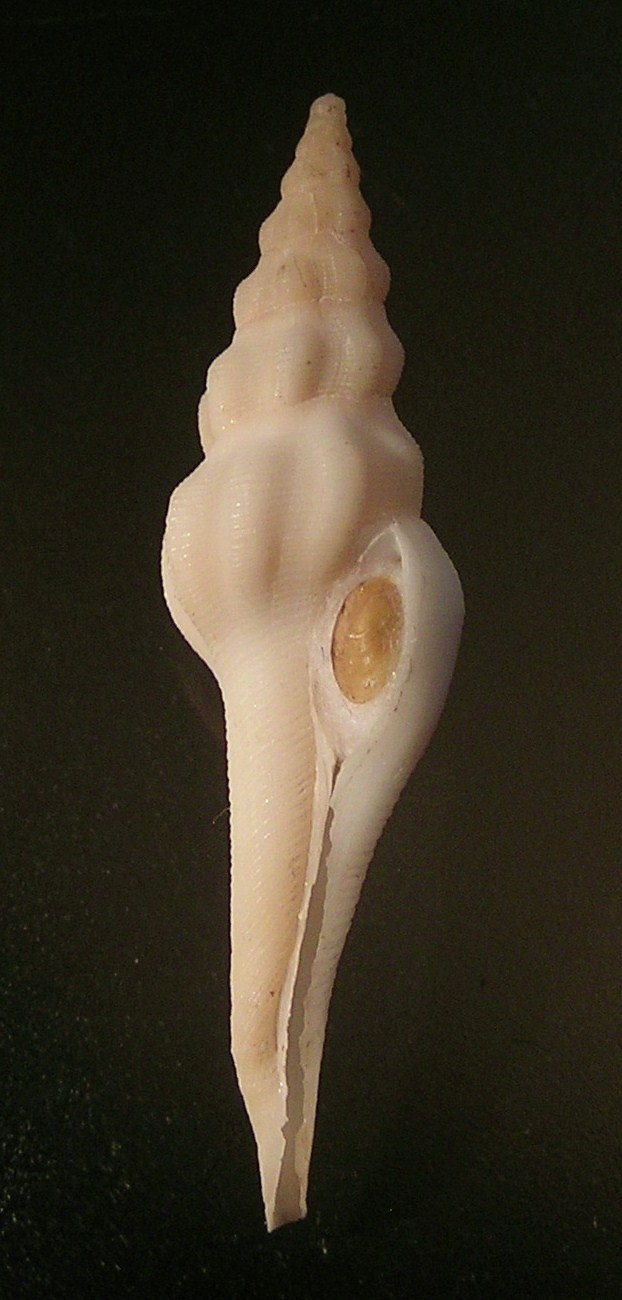

Scientific classification
- Kingdom: Animalia
- Phylum: Mollusca
- Class: Gastropoda
- Subclass: Caenogastropoda
- Order: Neogastropoda
- Family: Fasciolariidae
- Genus: Pseudolatirus
- Species: P. clausicaudatus

Binomial name
- Pseudolatirus clausicaudatus (Hinds, 1844)

Synonyms
- Crassibougia clausicaudatus (Hinds, R.B., 1844); Fusus clausicaudatus Hinds, 1844; Latirus clausicaudatus (Hinds, 1844)

= Pseudolatirus clausicaudatus =

Species of gastropod

Pseudolatirus clausicaudatus is a species of sea snail, a marine gastropod mollusc in the family Fasciolariidae, the spindle snails, the tulip snails and their allies.

== Description ==
The size of the shell varies between 25 mm and 56 mm.

== Distribution ==
This marine species occurs off Cape of Good Hope, South Africa.
