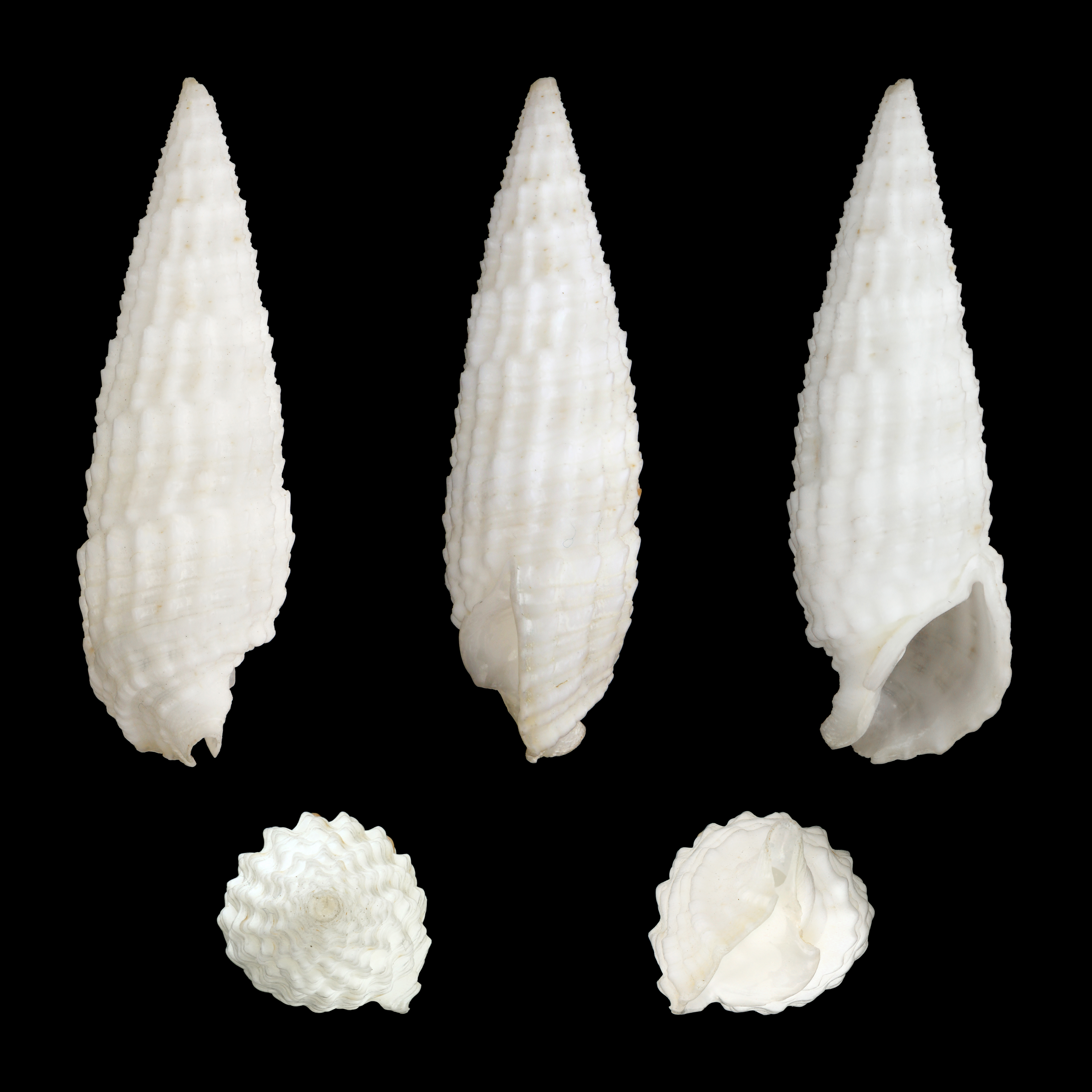
- Five views of a shell of Rhinoclavis aspera

Scientific classification
- Kingdom: Animalia
- Phylum: Mollusca
- Class: Gastropoda
- Subclass: Caenogastropoda
- Order: incertae sedis
- Family: Cerithiidae
- Genus: Rhinoclavis
- Species: R. aspera

Binomial name
- Rhinoclavis aspera (Linnaeus, 1758)

Synonyms
- Cerithium (Vertagus) asper (Linnaeus, 1758); Cerithium asperum Linnaeus, 1758; Cerithium lineatum Lamarck, 1822; Clava aspera (Linnaeus, 1758); Murex asper (Linnaeus, 1758); Murex granulatus Linnaeus, 1758; Rhinoclavis asper Rhinoclavis aspera (Linnaeus, 1758); Strombus vibex Gmelin, 1791; Vertagus asper (Linnaeus, 1758); Vertagus comptus G.B. Sowerby III, 1914; Vertagus granulatus (Linnaeus, 1758)

= Rhinoclavis aspera =

Species of gastropod

Rhinoclavis aspera is a species of sea snail, a marine gastropod mollusk in the family Cerithiidae.
