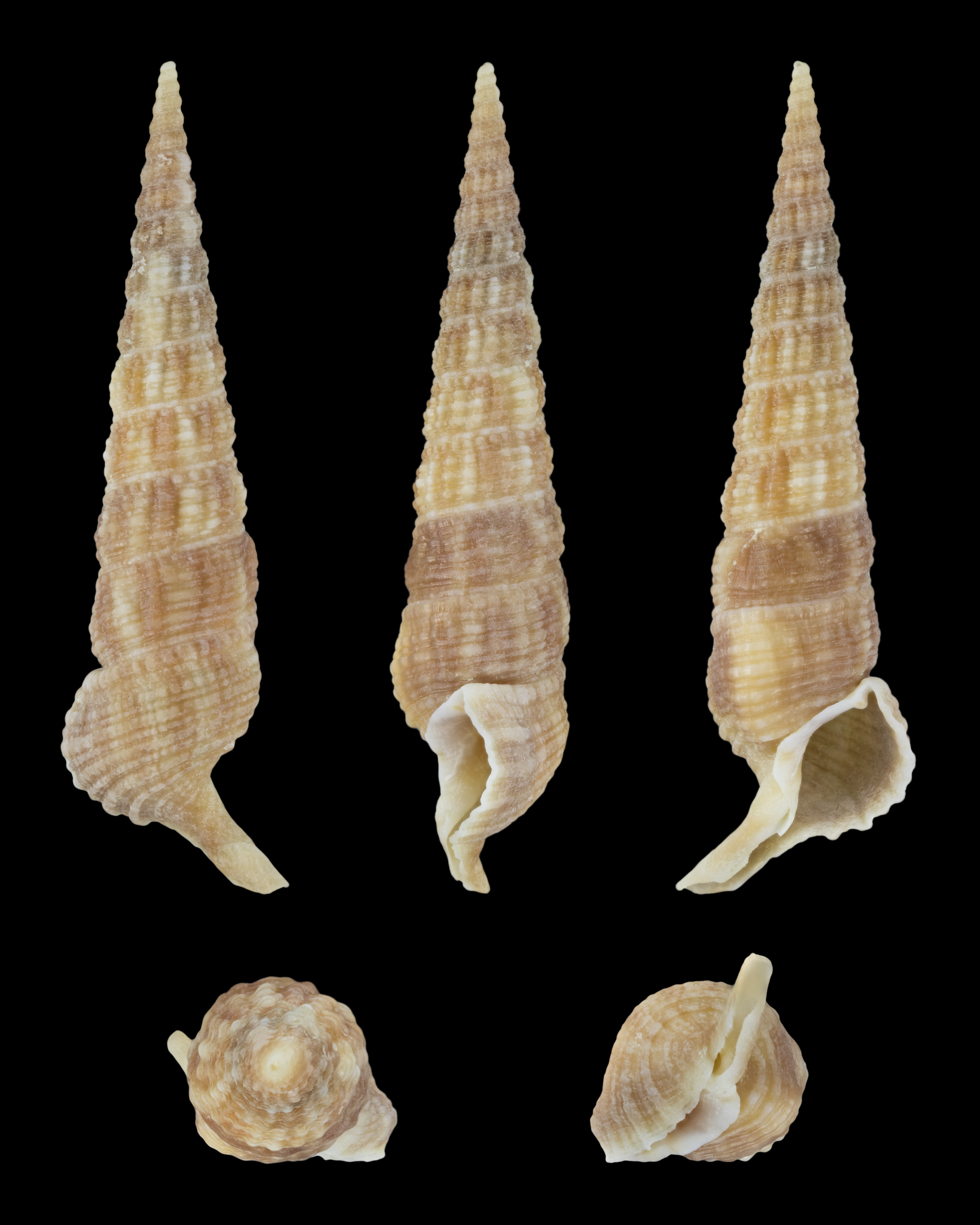

Scientific classification
- Kingdom: Animalia
- Phylum: Mollusca
- Class: Gastropoda
- Subclass: Caenogastropoda
- Order: incertae sedis
- Family: Cerithiidae
- Genus: Rhinoclavis
- Species: R. longicaudatum

Binomial name
- Rhinoclavis longicaudatum (A. Adams & Reeve, 1850)

Synonyms
- Cerithium (Vertagus) attenuatum Philippi, 1848; Cerithium attenuatum Philippi, 1848; Cerithium longicordatum A. Adams & Reeve, 1850; Vertagus attenuatus (Philippi, 1848)

= Rhinoclavis longicaudatum =

Species of gastropod

Rhinoclavis longicaudatum is a species of sea snail, a marine gastropod mollusk in the family Cerithiidae.
