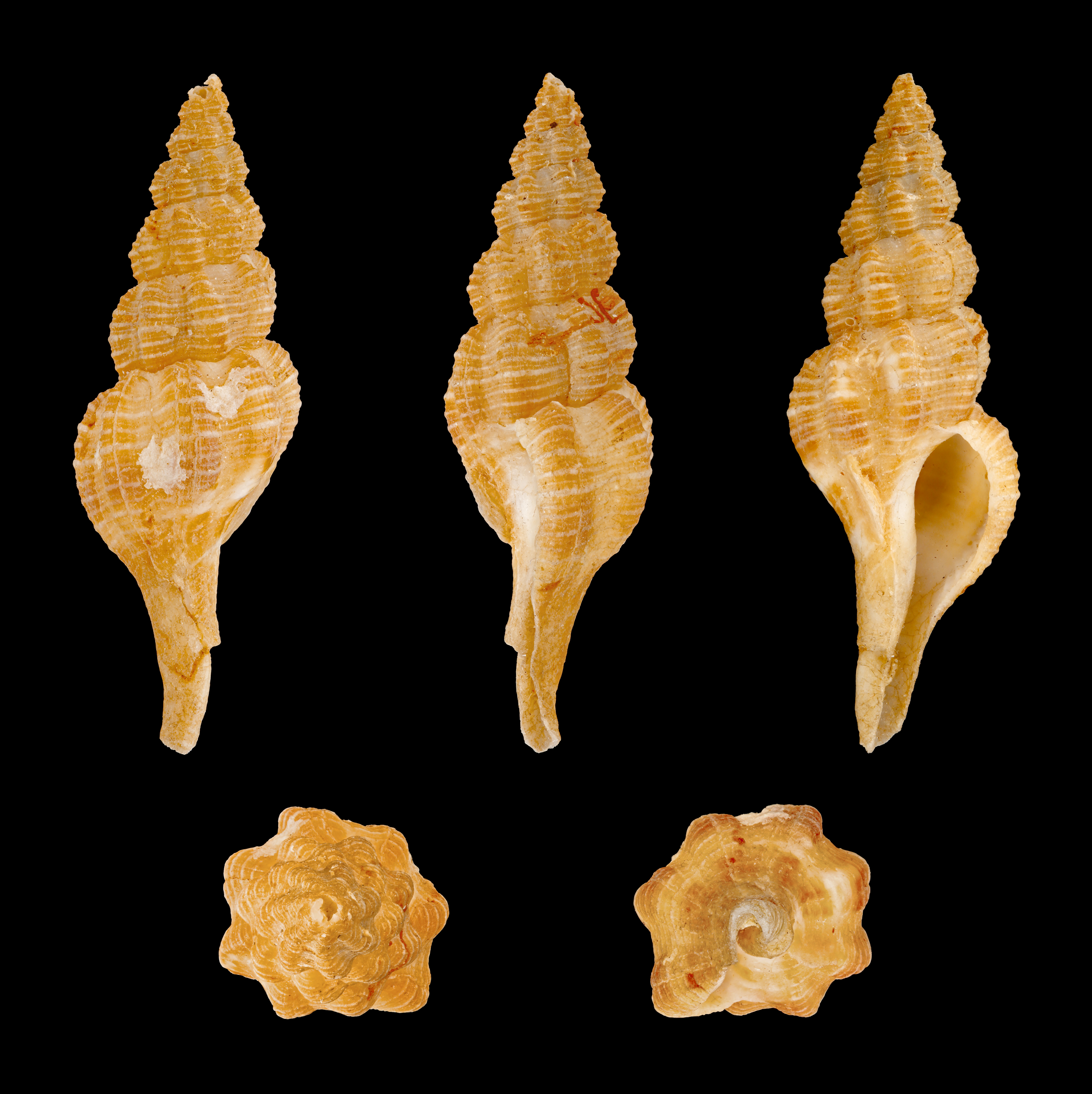
- Pseudolatirus kuroseanus (Okutani, 1975)

Scientific classification
- Kingdom: Animalia
- Phylum: Mollusca
- Class: Gastropoda
- Subclass: Caenogastropoda
- Order: Neogastropoda
- Family: Fasciolariidae
- Subfamily: Peristerniinae
- Genus: Pseudolatirus; Bellardi, 1884

Type species
- Latirus (Pseudolatirus) bilineata Hörnes, M., 1853

= Pseudolatirus =

Genus of gastropods

Pseudolatirus is a genus of sea snails, marine gastropod molluscs in the family Fasciolariidae, the spindle snails, the tulip snails and their allies.

== Species ==
Species within the genus Pseudolatirus include:

- Pseudolatirus clausicaudatus (Hinds, 1844)
- Pseudolatirus discrepans Kuroda & Habe, 1961
- Pseudolatirus kuroseanus (Okutani, 1975)
- Pseudolatirus leucostriatus Kosuge, 1979
- Pseudolatirus pallidus Kuroda & Habe, 1961
- Pseudolatirus pfeifferi (Philippi, 1846)
- † Pseudolatirus bilineatus (Hörnes, 1853)

Synonym

- Pseudolatirus kurodai Okutani & Sakurai, 1964: synonym of Fusolatirus kurodai (Okutani & Sakurai, 1964)
