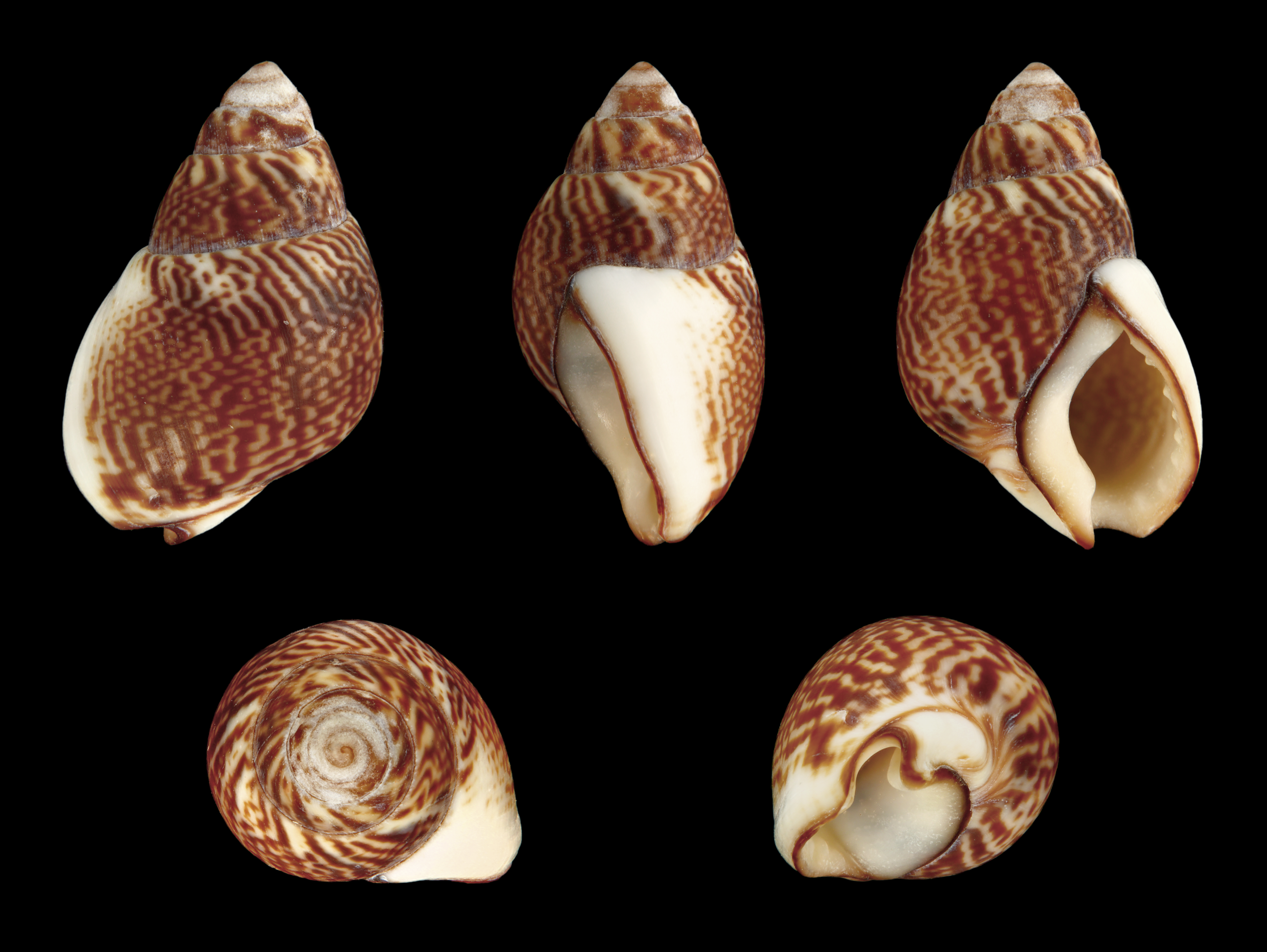

Scientific classification
- Kingdom: Animalia
- Phylum: Mollusca
- Class: Gastropoda
- Subclass: Caenogastropoda
- Order: Neogastropoda
- Family: Nassariidae
- Genus: Tritia
- Species: T. pfeifferi

Binomial name
- Tritia pfeifferi (Philippi, 1844)

Synonyms
- Amyclina pfefferi (Philippi); Buccinum glaberrimum Gmelin, 1791 (Nomen dubium. Doubtful synonym of Nassarius pfeifferi); Buccinum pfeifferi Philippi, 1844 (original combination); Nassarius pfeifferi (Philippi, 1844)

= Tritia pfeifferi =

Species of gastropod

Tritia pfeifferi is a species of sea snail, a marine gastropod mollusk in the family Nassariidae, the Nassa mud snails or dog whelks.

== Description ==
The shell size varies between 9 mm and 19 mm.

== Distribution ==
This species is occurs in the Atlantic Ocean off Spain, Portugal and Mauritania.
