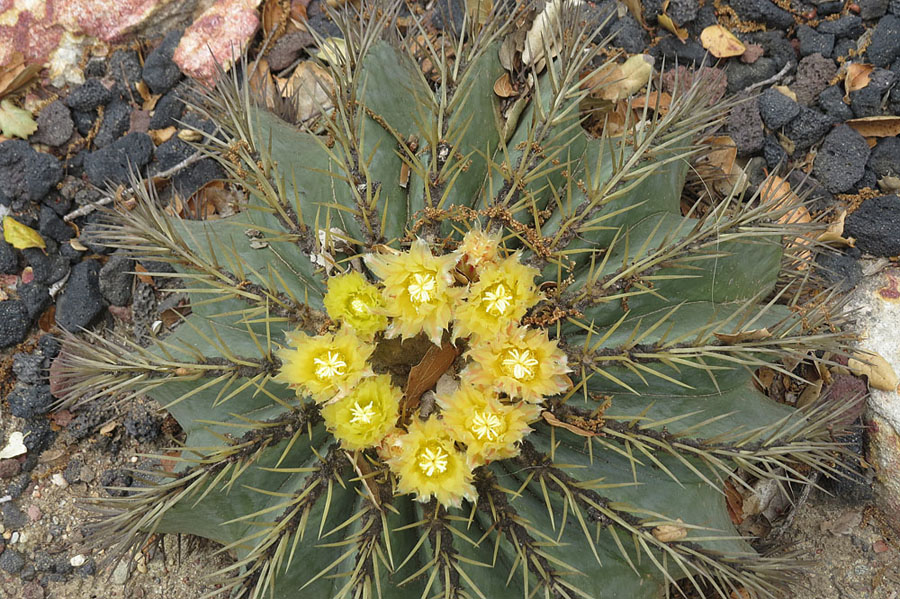

Conservation status
- Least Concern (IUCN 3.1)

Scientific classification
- Kingdom: Plantae
- Clade: Tracheophytes
- Clade: Angiosperms
- Clade: Eudicots
- Order: Caryophyllales
- Family: Cactaceae
- Subfamily: Cactoideae
- Genus: Ferocactus
- Species: F. glaucescens

Binomial name
- Ferocactus glaucescens (DC.) Britton & Rose

Synonyms
- List: Echinocactus glaucescens DC. 1828; Parrycactus glaucescens (DC.) Doweld 2000; Echinocactus dietrichianus C.F.Först. 1861; Echinocactus mammillarioides Hook. 1837; Echinocactus pfeifferi Zucc. ex Pfeiff. 1837; Echinocactus theiacanthus Lem. 1839; Echinocactus theionacanthus Lem. 1838; Echinofossulocactus pfeifferi (Zucc. ex Pfeiff.) Lawr. 1841; Ferocactus pfeifferi (Zucc. ex Pfeiff.) Backeb. 1961; Malacocarpus mammillarioides (Hook.) Britton & Rose 1922; Neoporteria mammillarioides (Hook.) Backeb. 1939; Neoporteria subgibbosa var. mammillarioides (Hook.) Donald & G.D.Rowley 1966; Pyrrhocactus mammillarioides (Hook.) Backeb. 1936

= Ferocactus glaucescens =

Species of cactus

Ferocactus glaucescens, the glaucous barrel cactus, is a species of flowering plant in the family Cactaceae, native endemic to México.

== Description ==
Ferocactus glaucescens is a solitary or branching cactus with spherical or cylindrical blue-green frosted shoots, growing up to 45 cm (18 in) in height and 60 cm (24 in) in diameter. The shoots have slightly depressed apices and 12 to 17 sharp-edged, non-tuberculated ribs with elongated areoles that are often connected. Its yellow spines, which are difficult to distinguish between central and peripheral, can reach up to 3.5 cm (1.4 in) in length, with one central spine and 6 to 7 radial spines.

The bell-shaped, yellow flowers of Ferocactus glaucescens are up to 4.5 cm (1.8 in) long and 2.5 to 3.5 cm (0.98 to 1.38 in) in diameter. Its spherical, whitish or yellowish, red-tinged fruits are fleshy, reaching lengths of up to 2.5 cm (0.98 in) and covered in yellowish, ciliated scales.

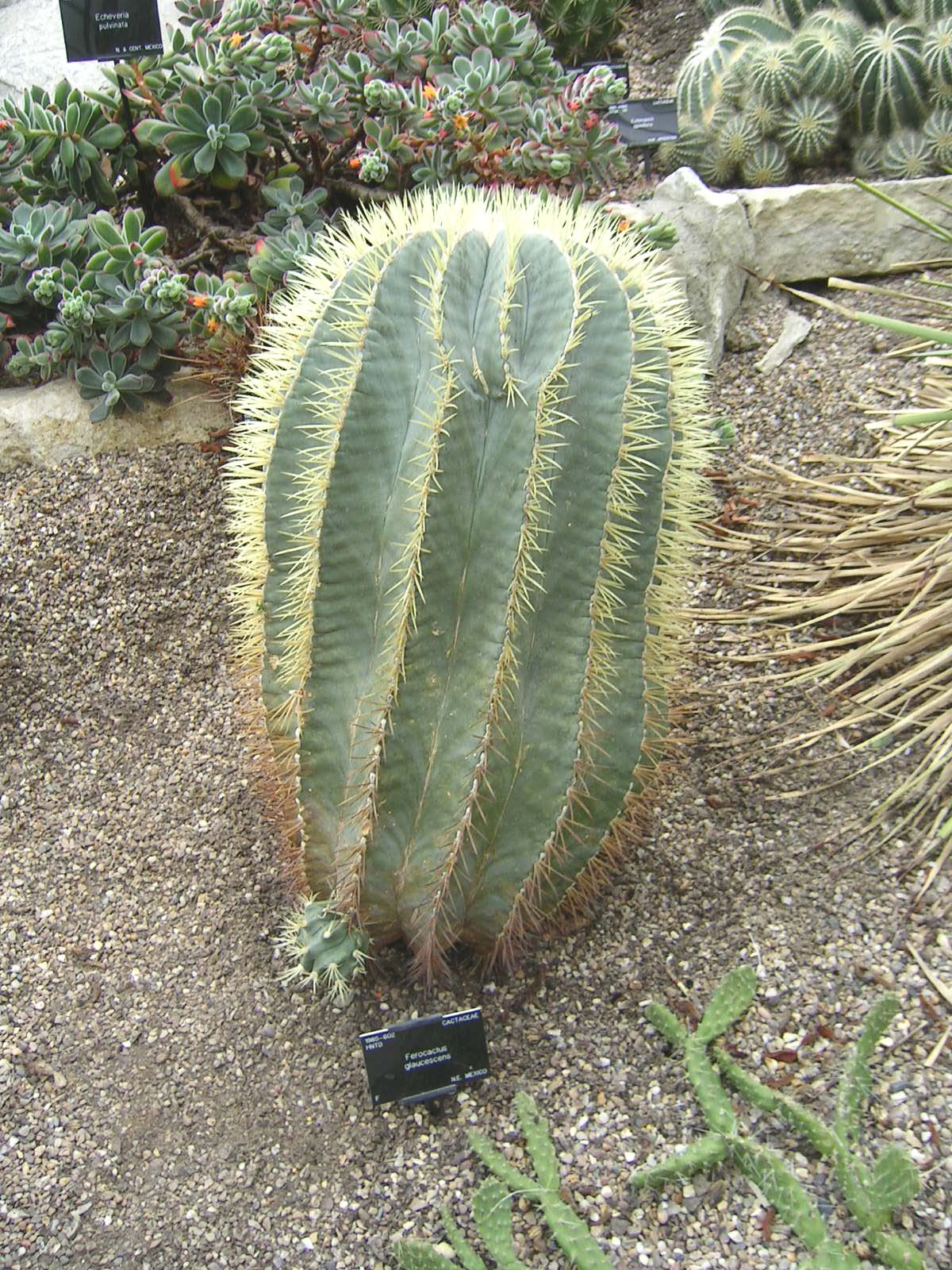
Adult Plant

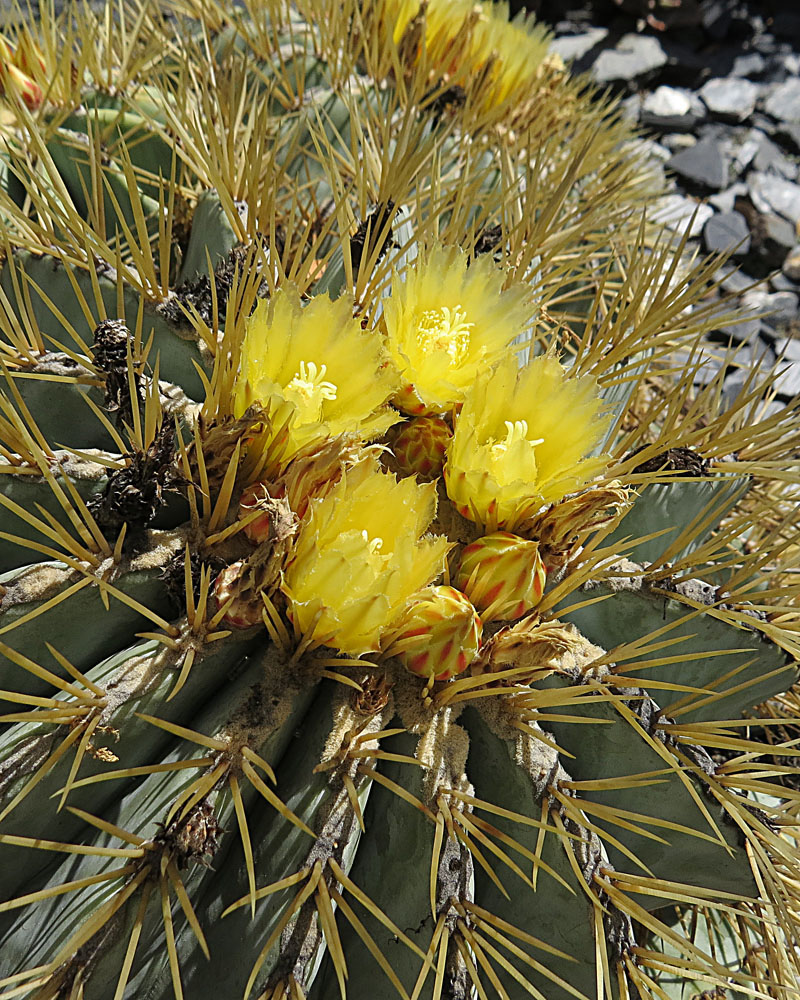
Flowers

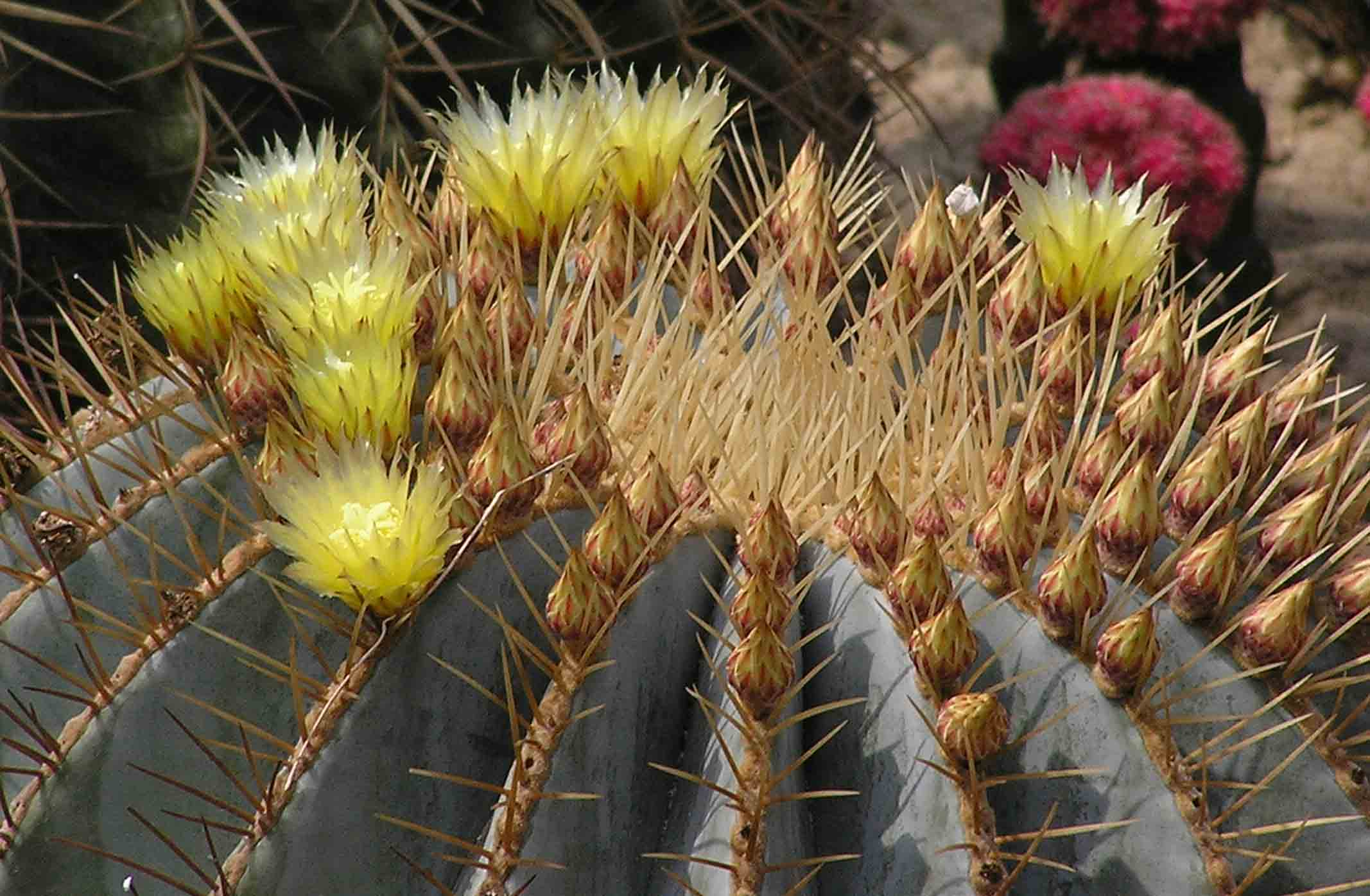
Flower and buds

== Distribution ==
This species is native to the limestone hills and dry forest of Hidalgo, Guanajuato, Querétaro, and San Luis Potosí states of Mexico at elevations of 550 to 2300 meters.

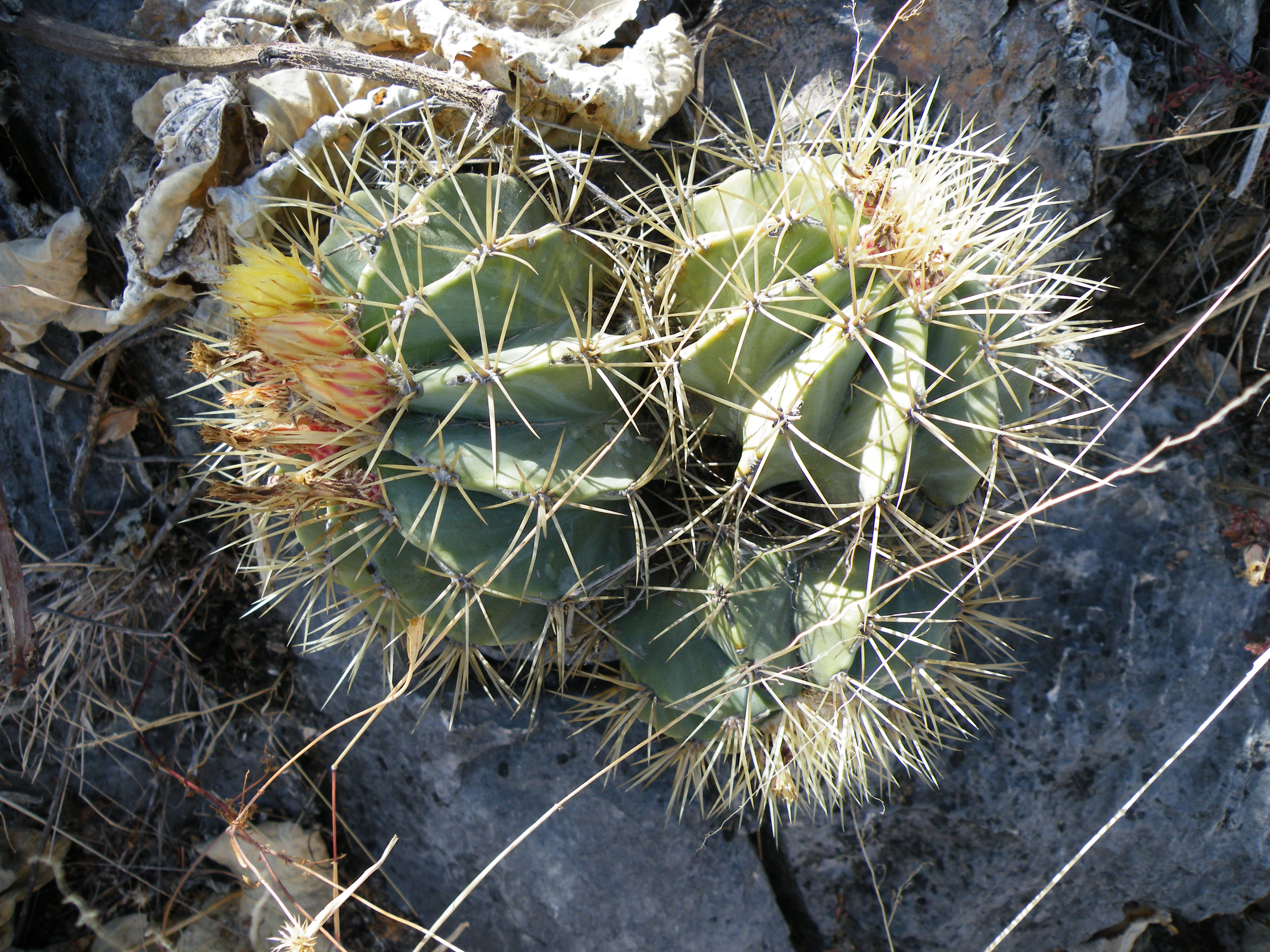
Plant growing between limestone south of Caricillo towards Xichu, Guanajuato

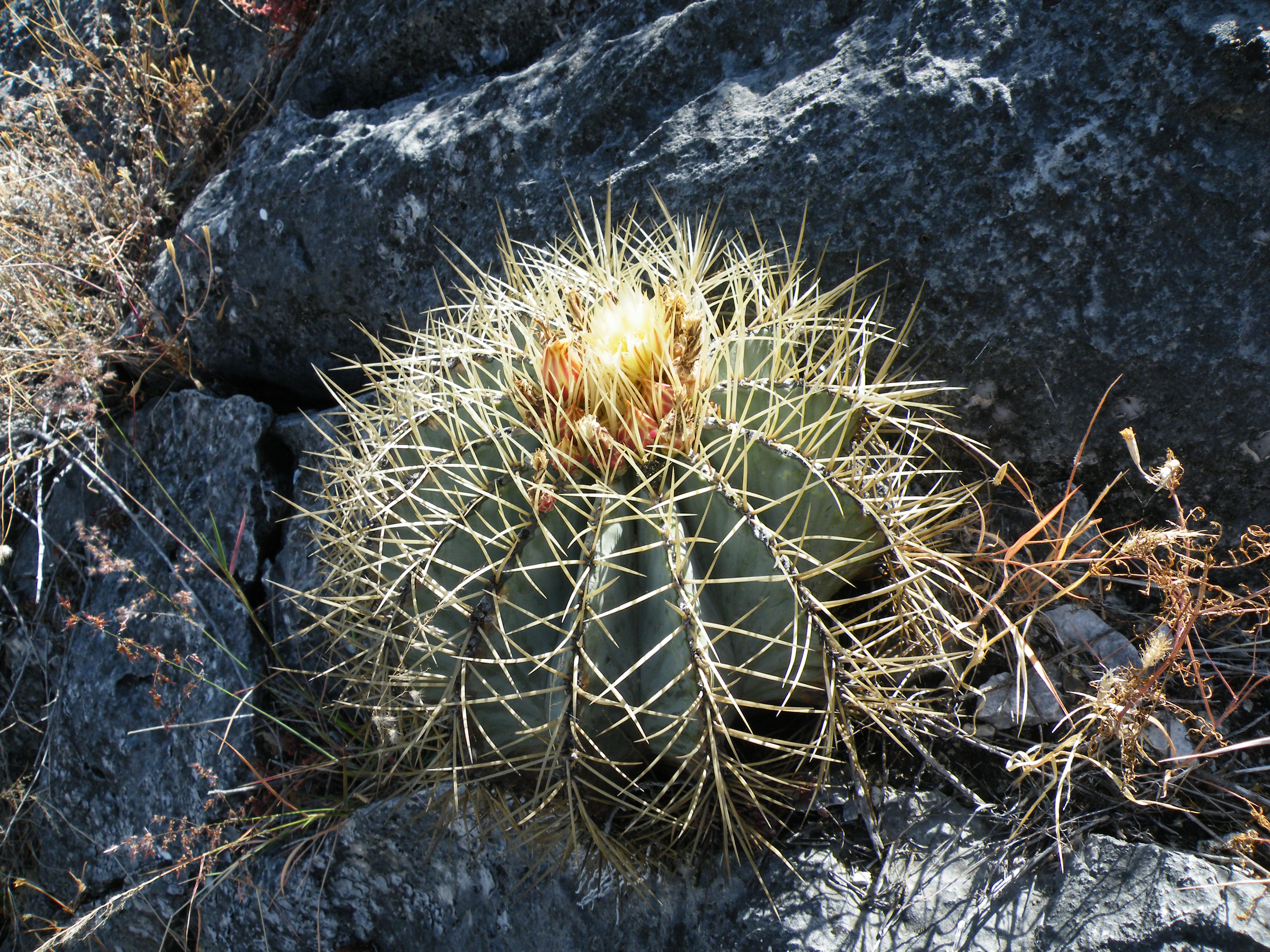
Plant growing in habitat south of Caricillo towards Xichu, Guanajuato

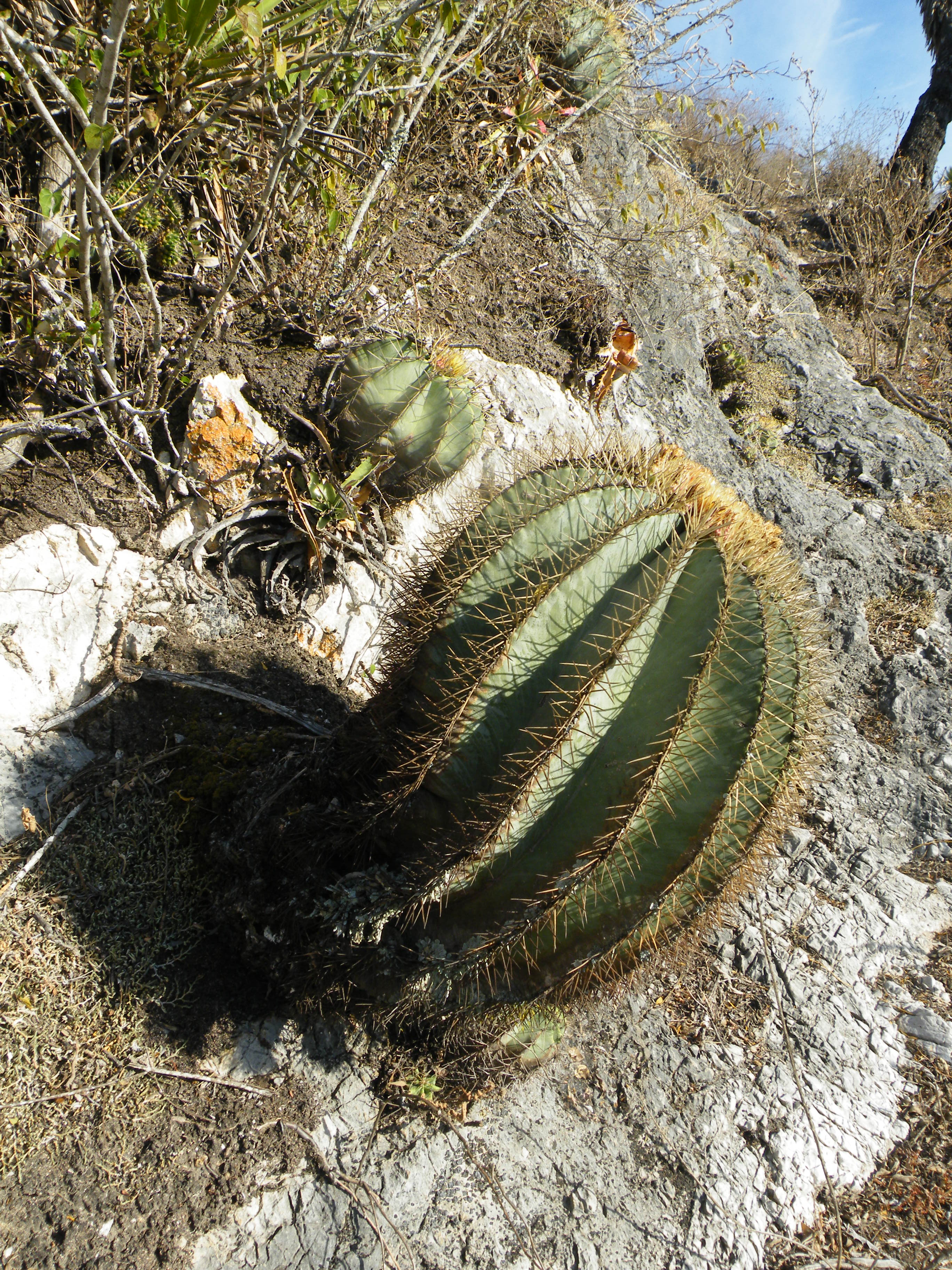
Habitat in Gilo, Hidalgo

== Taxonomy ==
First described as Echinocactus glaucescens in 1828 by Augustin Pyramus de Candolle, the specific epithet "glaucescens" comes from the Latin words "glaucus" for 'blue-green' and "-escens" for 'becoming', referring to the color of the shoots. In 1922, Nathaniel Lord Britton and Joseph Nelson Rose reclassified it into the genus Ferocactus.

== Cultivation ==
In cultivation in temperate regions it must be grown under glass. It has gained the Royal Horticultural Society's Award of Garden Merit. There is a spineless form, Ferocactus glaucescens forma nuda (inermis).

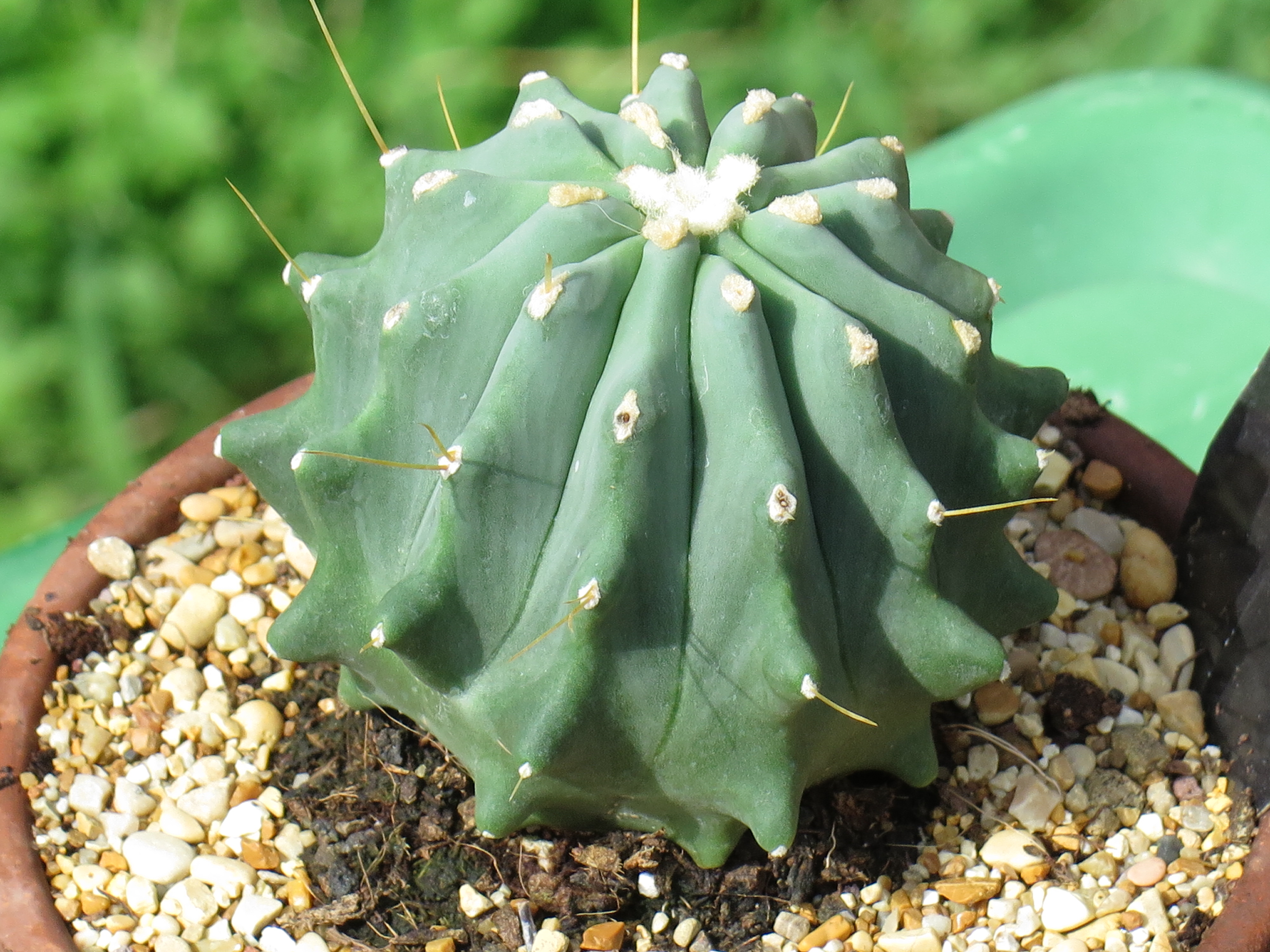
Ferocactus glaucescens forma nuda (inermis)

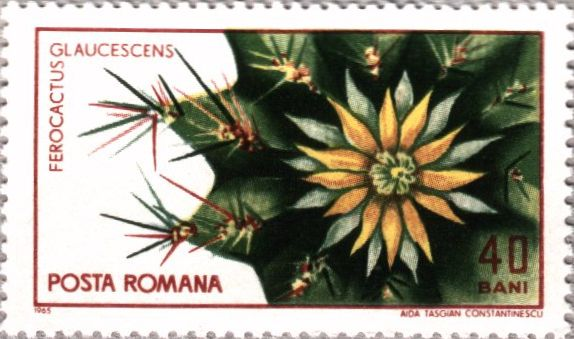
Postage stamp of Ferocactus glaucescens from Moldova
