= Pseudolatirus pfeifferi =

Scientific classification
- Kingdom: Animalia
- Phylum: Mollusca
- Class: Gastropoda
- Subclass: Caenogastropoda
- Order: Neogastropoda
- Family: Fasciolariidae
- Genus: Pseudolatirus
- Species: P. pfeifferi

Binomial name
- Pseudolatirus pfeifferi (Philippi, 1846)

Synonyms
- Fusus pfeifferi Philippi, 1846

Species of gastropod

Pseudolatirus pfeifferi is a species of sea snail, a marine gastropod mollusc in the family Fasciolariidae, the spindle snails, the tulip snails and their allies.
