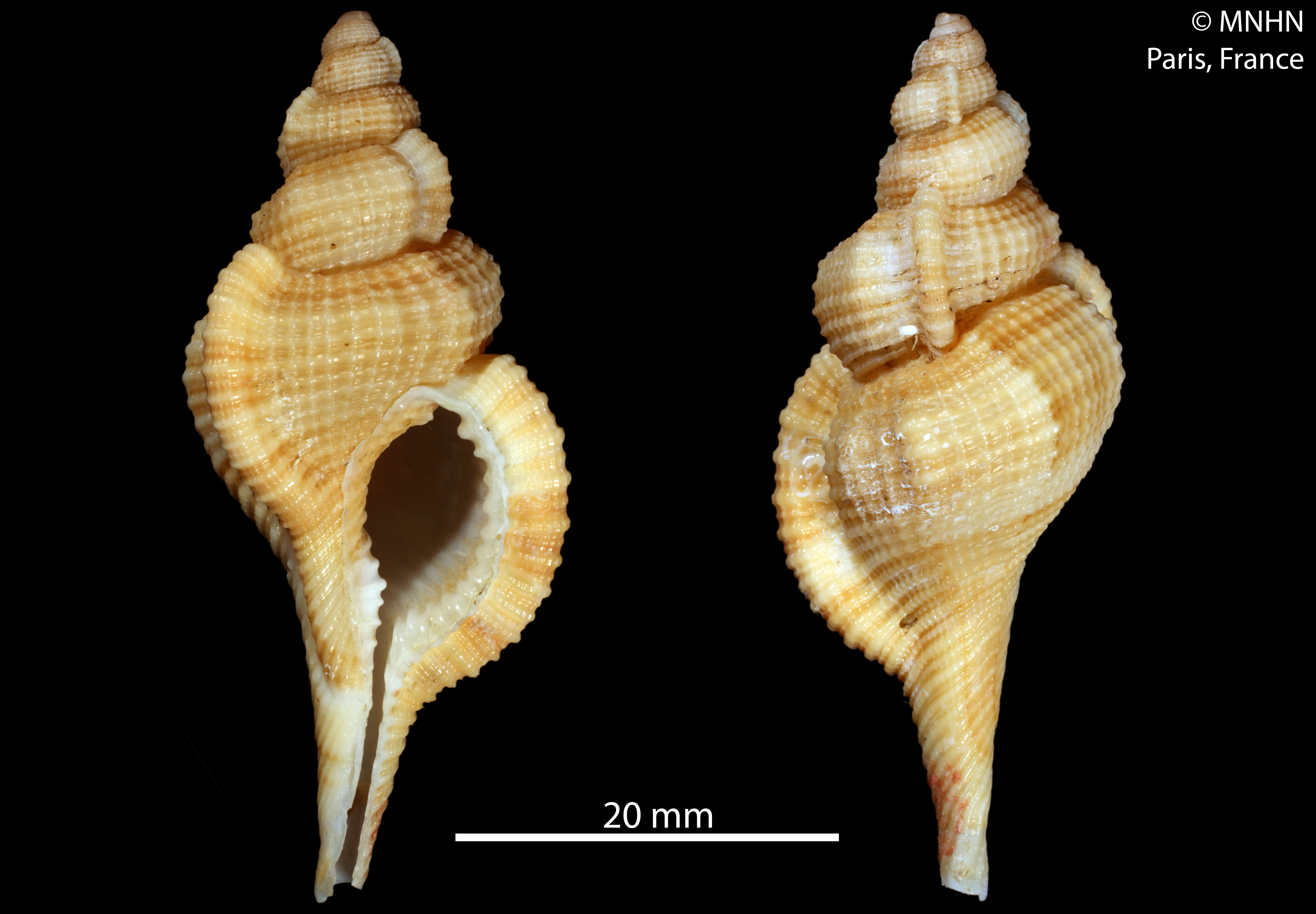
- Shell of Reticutriton pfeifferianus (specimen at MNHN. Paris)

Scientific classification
- Kingdom: Animalia
- Phylum: Mollusca
- Class: Gastropoda
- Subclass: Caenogastropoda
- Order: Littorinimorpha
- Family: Cymatiidae
- Genus: Reticutriton
- Species: R. pfeifferianus

Binomial name
- Reticutriton pfeifferianus (Reeve, 1844)

Synonyms
- † Cymatium (Gutturnium) bayeri van Regteren Altena, 1942; † Cymatium bayeri van Regteren Altena, 1942 †; Cymatium pfeifferianum (Reeve, 1844); Eutritonium pfeifferianum Reeve; Gutturnium gracile (Reeve, 1844); Triton gracilis Reeve, 1844; Triton pfeifferianus Reeve, 1844

= Reticutriton pfeifferianus =

Species of gastropod

Reticutriton pfeifferianus is a species of predatory sea snail, a marine gastropod mollusc in the family Cymatiidae.

== Description ==
The maximum recorded shell length is 46 mm.

== Habitat ==
Minimum recorded depth is 0 m. Maximum recorded depth is 46 m.

== Distribution ==
This marine species occurs in the Gulf of Mexico; in the Indian Ocean off Madagascar and the Mascarene Basin.
