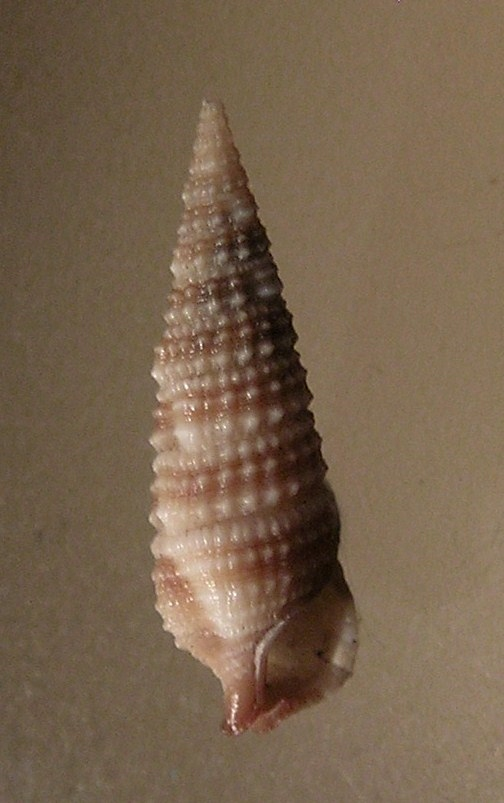
- Apertural view of a shell of Rhinoclavis sordidula

Scientific classification
- Kingdom: Animalia
- Phylum: Mollusca
- Class: Gastropoda
- Subclass: Caenogastropoda
- Order: incertae sedis
- Family: Cerithiidae
- Genus: Rhinoclavis
- Species: R. sordidula

Binomial name
- Rhinoclavis sordidula (Gould, 1849)

Synonyms
- Cerithium (Proclava) pfeifferi (Dunker, 1882); Cerithium (Vertagus) turritum G.B. Sowerby II, 1855; Cerithium serratum Bruguière, 1789; Cerithium serratum var. sordidula Gould, 1849; Cerithium sordidulum Gould, 1849; Cerithium turritum G.B. Sowerby II, 1855; Clava pfeifferi (Dunker, 1882); Clava turritum (G.B. Sowerby II, 1855); Clava turritum var. pfeifferi (Dunker, 1882); Rhinoclavis sordidula (Gould, 1849); Vertagus pfeifferi Dunker, 1882

= Rhinoclavis sordidula =

Species of gastropod

Rhinoclavis sordidula is a species of sea snail, a marine gastropod mollusk in the family Cerithiidae.
