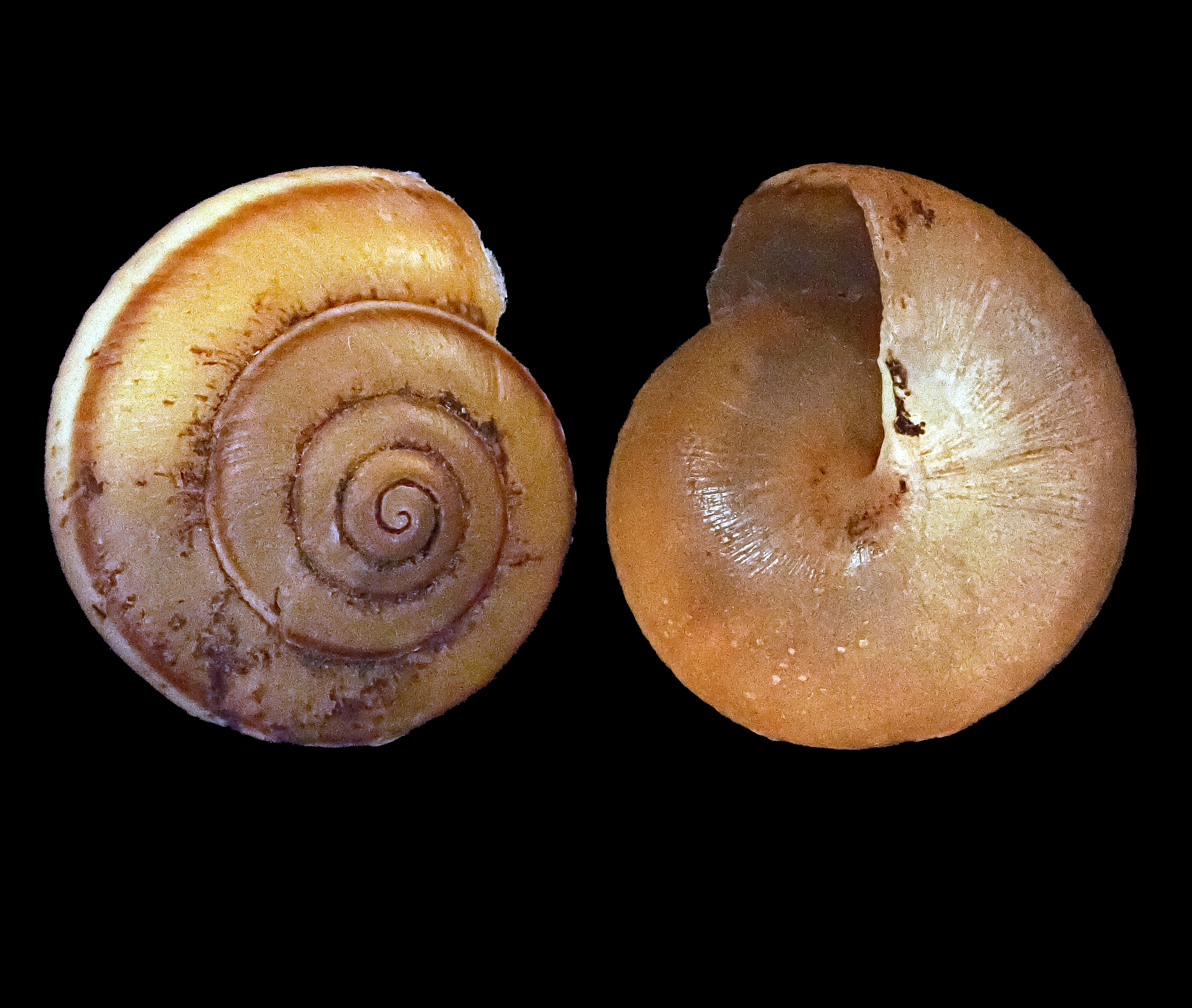
- Shell of Pfeifferia stevenliei (holotype at MNHN, Paris)

Scientific classification
- Kingdom: Animalia
- Phylum: Mollusca
- Class: Gastropoda
- Order: Stylommatophora
- Infraorder: Helicoidei
- Superfamily: Helicoidea
- Family: Camaenidae
- Genus: Pfeifferia; Gray, 1853

Type species
- Helix micans L. Pfeiffer, 1845

Synonyms
- Chloraea (Chromatosphaera) Pilsbry, 1892(superseded generic combination); Chloraea (Pfeifferia) Gray, 1853 (superseded combination); Cochlostyla (Chromatosphaera) Pilsbry, 1892 (superseded generic combination); Cochlostyla (Pfeifferia) Gray, 1853 (superseded combination); Helicostyla (Chromatosphaera) Pilsbry, 1892 (superseded combination); Helicostyla (Pfeifferia) Gray, 1853 (unaccepted rank); Pfeifferia (Chromatosphaera) Pilsbry, 1892 · alternate representation

= Pfeifferia (gastropod) =

Genus of gastropods

Pfeifferia is a genus of air-breathing land snails, terrestrial pulmonate gastropod mollusks in the subfamily Helicostylinae of the family Camaenidae.

== Characteristics ==
The animal is notably large for the size of the shell, featuring a mantle edge that is expanded and thin. This edge is reflexed over the outer surface of the shell when the animal is contracted in spirits, thereby forming an even margin along the outer part of the peristome. The foot is moderate in size, depressed behind, and acute at the tips, and it is notably without any subcaudal gland.

The shell is subglobose and imperforate, characterized as being thin, brittle, white, and pellucid. Within the spire, the whorls start small, but the third and fourth whorls rapidly enlarge, leading to a body whorl that is distinctly inflated. The aperture is rounded and lunate in shape, while the columella is slightly and regularly arched. Finally, the peristome is thin, straight, and acute.

== Species ==
- Pfeifferia aurata (G. B. Sowerby I, 1841)
- Pfeifferia erubescens (C. Semper, 1877)
- Pfeifferia lividocincta (C. Semper, 1877)
- Pfeifferia luteocincta (C. Semper, 1877)
- Pfeifferia micans (L. Pfeiffer, 1845)
- Pfeifferia pudibunda (C. Semper, 1877)
- Pfeifferia stevenliei Thach & Abbas, 2021
