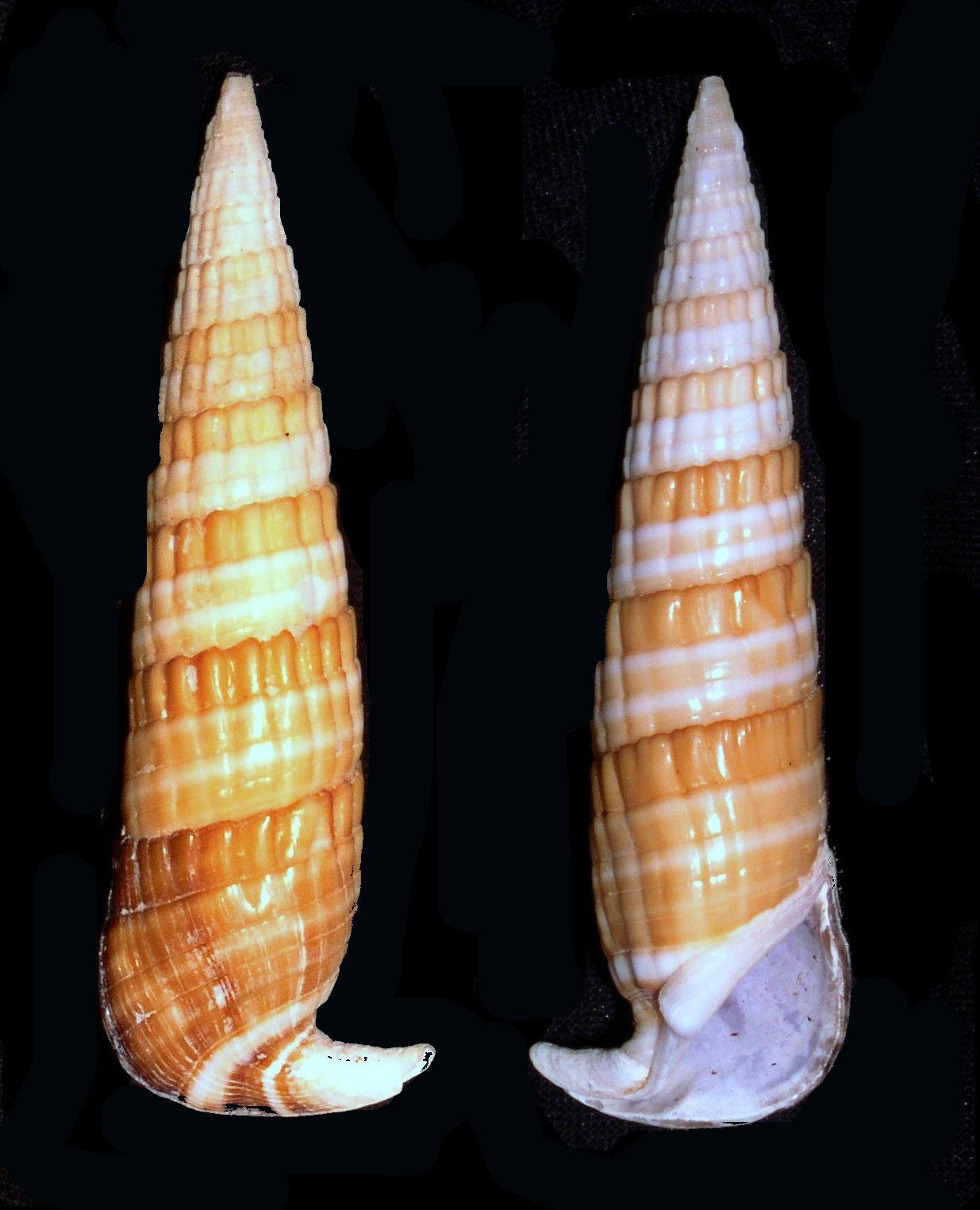
- shell of Rhinoclavis fasciata

Scientific classification
- Kingdom: Animalia
- Phylum: Mollusca
- Class: Gastropoda
- Subclass: Caenogastropoda
- Order: incertae sedis
- Family: Cerithiidae
- Genus: Rhinoclavis
- Species: R. fasciata

Binomial name
- Rhinoclavis fasciata (Bruguière, 1792)

Synonyms
- Cerithium bandatum Perry, 1811; Cerithium fasciatum Bruguière, 1792; Cerithium martinianum Pfeiffer, 1840; Cerithium pharos Hinds, 1844; Cerithium procerum Kiener, 1841; Clava (Clava) fasciata (Bruguière, 1792); Rhinoclavis fasciata (Bruguière, 1792); Rhinoclavis mountfordae Cotton, 1964; Strombus carminatus Röding, 1798; Vertagus fasciatus (Bruguière, 1792); Vertagus pharos (Hinds, 1844)

= Rhinoclavis fasciata =

Species of gastropod

Rhinoclavis fasciata is a species of sea snail, a marine gastropod mollusk in the family Cerithiidae.
