= Cylindrella =

Cylindrella may refer to:

- Cylindrella Pfeiffer, 1840, a genus of gastropods in the family Helicidae, synonym of Brachypodella
- Cylindrella Swainson, 1840, a genus of gastropods in the family Cylichnidae, synonym of Cylichna
- Cylindrella Swainson, 1840, a genus of gastropods in the family Conidae, synonym of Asprella
