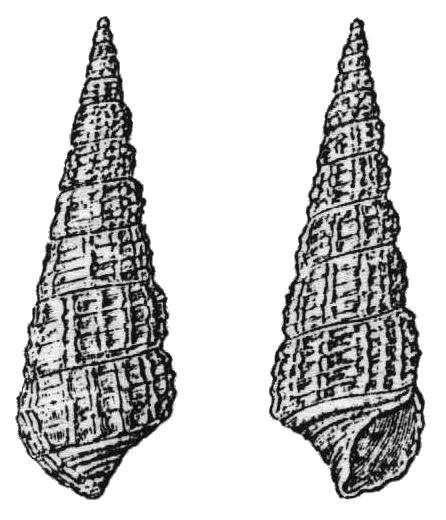
- Drawing from Hartling 1886, two views of a shell of Bittium reticulatum

Scientific classification
- Kingdom: Animalia
- Phylum: Mollusca
- Class: Gastropoda
- Subclass: Caenogastropoda
- Order: incertae sedis
- Superfamily: Cerithioidea
- Family: Cerithiidae
- Genus: Bittium; Leach in Gray, 1847

Type species
- Strombiformis reticulatus da Costa, 1778

Synonyms
- Bittium (Bittium) Gray, 1847· accepted, alternate representation; Bittium (Brachybittium) Weisbord, 1962· accepted, alternate representation; Bittium (Rasbittium) Gründel, 1976 (junior objective synonym of Manobittium); Cerithiolum Tiberi, 1869 (junior objective synonym of Bittium); Cerithium (Bittium) Gray, 1847; Dahlakia Biggs, 1971; Inobittium Monterosato, 1917; Manobittium Monterosato, 1917

= Bittium =

Genus of gastropods

Bittium is a genus of very small sea snails, marine gastropod molluscs in the family Cerithiidae, the horn snails.

== Distribution ==
This genus is found worldwide.

== Species ==
Species in the genus Bittium include:

- Bittium aedonium (Watson, 1880)
- Bittium afrum
- Bittium amboynense (Watson, 1881)
- Bittium anembatum (Melvill, 1904)
- Bittium aquaticum
- Bittium arenaense Hertlein & Strong, 1951
- Bittium armillatum (Carpenter, 1864)
- Bittium arnoldi Bartsch, 1911
- Bittium atramentarium Melvill & Standen, 1901
- Bittium bandatum Bozzetti, 2019
- Bittium bartolomense Bartsch, 1917
- Bittium batillarium Kuroda & Habe, 1971
- Bittium casmaliense Bartsch, 1911
- Bittium cerithium
- Bittium cerralvoense Bartsch, 1911
- Bittium challisae Bartsch, 1917
- Bittium chrysomallum Melvill, 1901
- Bittium circa Moreno, 2006
- Bittium clathratalum
- † Bittium courtillerianum (Millet, 1865)
- † Bittium crassicostatum (Etheridge & Bell, 1898)
- † Bittium crassum Landau, Ceulemans & Van Dingenen, 2018
- Bittium decussatum (Carpenter, 1857)
- Bittium delicatum (Watson, 1880)
- Bittium depauperatum (Watson, 1880)
- Bittium diminutivum (Philippi, 1845)
- Bittium dumblei
- Bittium editum (Powell, 1930)
- Bittium elegantissimum (Hedley, 1899)
- † Bittium eniwetokense Ladd, 1972
- Bittium exiguum
- Bittium fastigiatum Carpenter, 1864
- Bittium filosum
- Bittium fretense
- † Bittium gallicum Landau, Ceulemans & Van Dingenen, 2018
- Bittium giganteum Bartsch, 1911
- Bittium glareosum Gould, 1861
- † Bittium gliberti Van Dingenen, Ceulemans & Landau, 2016
- Bittium hartbergense
- Bittium hawaiiensis
- Bittium impendens (Hedley, 1899)
- Bittium incile Watson, 1897
- Bittium inornatum Bartsch, 1911
- Bittium insulsum Preston, 1908
- Bittium koeneni
- Bittium lacteum (Philippi, 1836)
- Bittium laevicordatum (Powell, 1937)
- † Bittium larrieyense Vignal, 1911
- Bittium latreillii (Payraudeau, 1826)
- † Bittium lozoueti Van Dingenen, Ceulemans & Landau, 2016
- Bittium lusciniae (Watson, 1880)
- Bittium mexicanum Bartsch, 1911
- Bittium midwayense Kosuge, 1979
- Bittium multiliratum
- Bittium nanum (Mayer, 1864)
- Bittium nicholsi Bartsch, 1911
- Bittium nitens Carpenter, 1864
- Bittium ornatissimum Bartsch, 1911
- Bittium paleonotum
- Bittium paludosum
- Bittium panamense Bartsch, 1911
- Bittium peruvianum (d'Orbigny, 1841)
- Bittium philomelae (Watson, 1880)
- Bittium pigrum (Watson, 1880)
- † Bittium pingue Landau, Ceulemans & Van Dingenen, 2018
- Bittium porcellanum Watson, 1886
- Bittium proteum (Jousseaume, 1930)
- Bittium pupiforme (Watson, 1880)
- Bittium quadricinctum E. A. Smith, 1903
- † Bittium renauleauense Landau, Ceulemans & Van Dingenen, 2018
- Bittium reticulatum (da Costa, 1778) –
- Bittium rubanocinctum
- Bittium russiensis
- Bittium salinae
- Bittium sanjuanense Bartsch, 1917
- Bittium santamariense Bartsch, 1917
- Bittium scalatum
- Bittium semigranosum
- Bittium semigranulosum'
- Bittium serra Bartsch, 1917
- Bittium simplex (Jeffreys, 1867)
- Bittium spina
- Bittium stigmosum
- Bittium submamillatum (Jeffreys, 1867)
- † Bittium sublima (d'Orbigny, 1852)
- Bittium tenebrisbrunneis Poppe & Tagaro, 2026
- Bittium tenuispina
- Bittium terebelloides
- † Bittium transenna (Bayan, 1873)
- Bittium tumidum Bartsch, 1907
- Bittium turritella
- Bittium vancouverense Dall & Bartsch, 1910
- † Bittium venustulum (Millet, 1865)
- † Bittium vignali Dollfus, 1909
- Bittium watsoni (Jeffreys, 1885)
- Bittium xanthum Watson, 1886

Species brought into synonymy

- Bittium adamsi Dall, 1889: synonym of Finella adamsi (Dall, 1889)
- Bittium alternatum (Say, 1822) and Bittium nigrum (Totten, 1834) are synonyms of Bittiolum alternatum (Say, 1822)
- Bittium asperum Gabb, 1861: synonym of Lirobittium asperum (Gabb, 1861)
- Bittium attenuatum Carpenter, 1864 – slender cerith: synonym of Lirobittium attenuatum (Carpenter, 1864)
- Bittium boeticum (Pease, 1860) and Bittium pusillum (Gould, 1851) are synonyms of Cerithium boeticum Pease, 1860
- Bittium catalinense Bartsch, 1907: synonym of Lirobittium purpureum (Carpenter, 1864)
- Bittium cinctum Hutton, 1885: synonym of Seila cincta (Hutton, 1886)
- † Bittium cossmanni: synonym of † Hemicerithium cossmanni (Dall, 1892)
- Bittium diplax Watson, 1886 is a synonym of Cerithidium diplax (Watson, 1886)
- Bittium eschrichti (Middendorff, 1849): synonym of Neostylidium eschrichtii (Middendorff, 1849)
- Bittium estuarinumTate, 1893: synonym of Zeacumantus plumbeus (G. B. Sowerby II, 1855)
- Bittium exile (Hutton, 1873): synonym of Zebittium exile (Hutton, 1873)
- Bittium fetellum Bartsch, 1911: synonym of Lirobittium fetellum (Bartsch, 1911) (original combination)
- Bittium furvum Watson, 1886 : synonym of Cacozeliana furva (Watson, 1886)
- Bittium fuscocapitulum Hedley & Petterd, 1906 : synonym of Cacozeliana fuscocapitulum (Hedley & Petterd, 1906)
- Bittium granarium (Kiener, 1842) is a synonym of Cacozeliana granarium (Kiener, 1842)
- Bittium hiloense: synonym of Bittinella hiloensis (Pilsbry & Vanatta, 1908)
- Bittium houbricki Ponder, 1993 : synonym of Ittibittium houbricki (Ponder, 1993)
- Bittium icarus (Bayle, 1880) : synonym of Cacozeliana icarus (Bayle, 1880)
- Bittium interfossa (Carpenter, 1864): synonym of Lirobittium interfossa (Carpenter, 1864)
- Bittium jadertinum Brusina, 1865: synonym of Bittium reticulatum (da Costa, 1778)
- Bittium johnstonae Bartsch, 1911: synonym of Lirobittium johnstonae (Bartsch, 1911) (original combination)
- Bittium larum Bartsch, 1911: synonym of Lirobittium larum (Bartsch, 1911) (original combination)
- Bittium lawleyanum Crosse, 1863: synonym of Zeacumantus plumbeus (G. B. Sowerby II, 1855)
- Bittium leucocephalum Watson, 1886 : synonym of Argyropeza leucocephala (Watson, 1886)
- Bittium minutulum: synonym of Batillariella minutula (Thiele, 1930) (original combination)
- Bittium munitum (Carpenter, 1864): synonym of Lirobittium munitum (Carpenter, 1864)
- Bittium oldroydae Bartsch, 1911: synonym of Lirobittium oldroydae (Bartsch, 1911) (original combination)
- Bittium oryza (Mörch, 1876) : synonym of Ittibittium oryza (Mörch, 1876)
- Bittium paganicum (Dall, 1919): synonym of Lirobittium paganicum (Dall, 1919)
- Bittium parcum Gould, 1861 is a synonym of Ittibittium parcum (Gould, 1861)
- Bittium perparvulum Watson, 1886 is a synonym of Cerithidium perparvulum (Watson, 1886)
- Bittium perpusillum Tryon, 1887 : synonym of Cerithium alutaceum (Gould, 1861)
- Bittium plumbeum: synonym of Zeacumantus plumbeus (G. B. Sowerby II, 1855)
- Bittium quadrifilatum Carpenter, 1864 – four-thread cerith: synonym of Lirobittium quadrifilatum (Carpenter, 1864) (original combination)
- Bittium scabrum (Olivi, 1792) : synonym of Bittium reticulatum (da Costa, 1778)
- Bittium seymourianum Strebel, 1908: synonym of Cerithiella seymouriana (Strebel, 1908) (original combination)
- Bittium subplanatum Bartsch, 1911: synonym of Lirobittium rugatum (Carpenter, 1864)
- Bittium torresiense Melvill & Standen, 1899 : synonym of Bittium elegantissimum (Hedley, 1899)
- Bittium variegatum Henn & Brazier, 1894 : synonym of Cacozeliana variegatum (Henn & Brazier, 1894)
- Bittium varium (Pfeiffer, 1840) – grass cerith is a synonym of Bittiolum varium (Pfeiffer, 1840)
- Bittium zebrum (Kiener, 1841) is a synonym of Cerithium zebrum Kiener, 1841

Nomen dubium

- Bittium alabastrulum (Mörch, 1876)
- Bittium caraboboense (Weisbord, 1962)
- Bittium galactis Mörch, 1876
- Bittium lima (Bruguière, 1792)

== See also ==
- Cerithium
- Ittibittium
