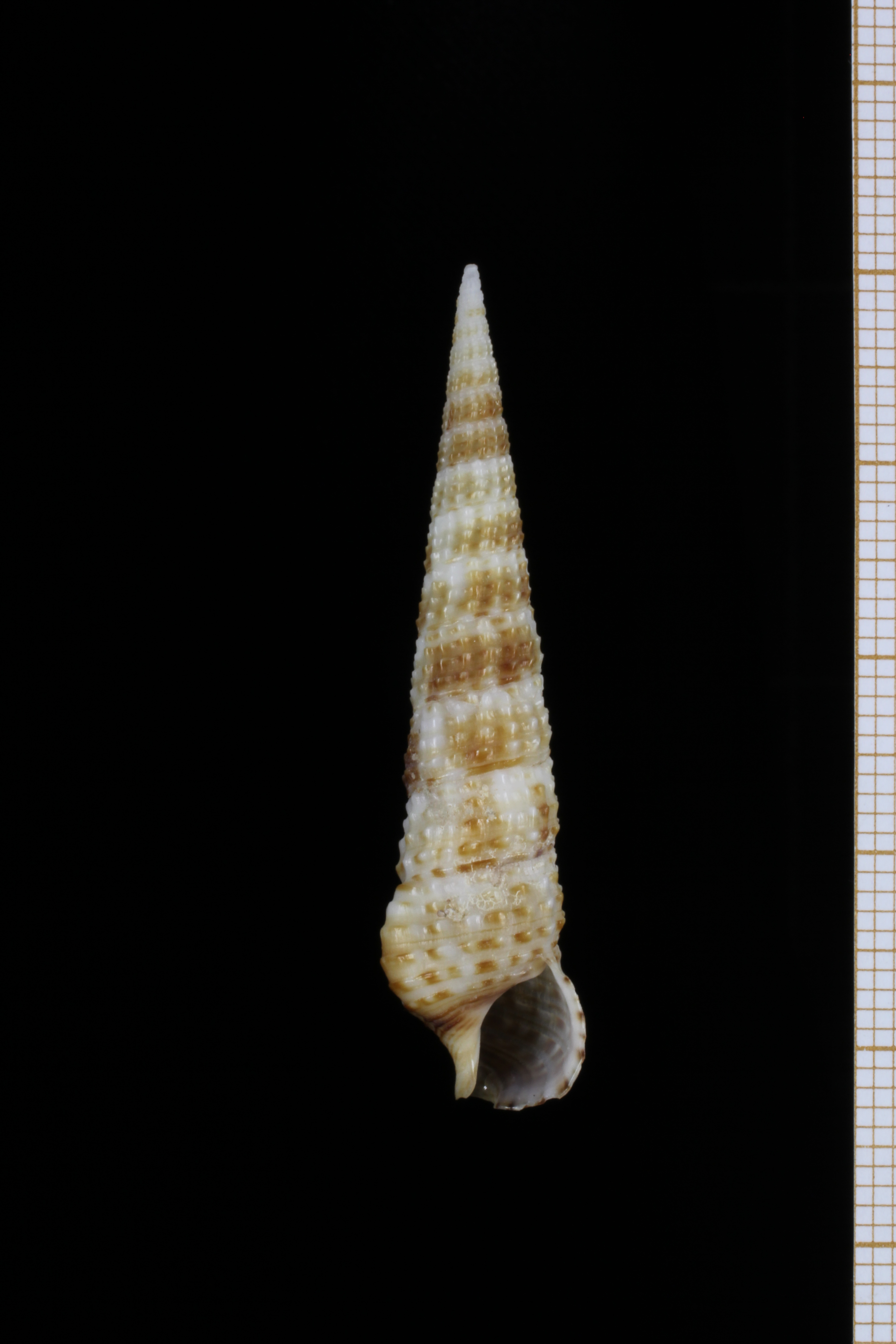
- Shell of Cerithium matukense (specimen at MNHN, Paris)

Scientific classification
- Kingdom: Animalia
- Phylum: Mollusca
- Class: Gastropoda
- Subclass: Caenogastropoda
- Order: incertae sedis
- Family: Cerithiidae
- Genus: Cerithium
- Species: C. matukense

Binomial name
- Cerithium matukense Watson, 1880

Synonyms
- Cerithium (Proclava) matukense (Watson, 1880); Cerithium turritellaeforme Wissema, 1947

= Cerithium matukense =

Species of gastropod

Cerithium matukense is a species of sea snail, a marine gastropod mollusk in the family Cerithiidae.

== Description ==
The shell is turreted, slender and elongate, with 15-23 straight-sided whorls with an apical angle of 20 degrees. The shell can reach 70.5 mm length and 18.2 mm width. The snail itself has a short, wide snout with thick cephalic tentacles and tiny black eyes.

== Distribution ==
This marine species occurs in the western Pacific and the Indian Ocean, near the Philippines, Fiji, New Caledonia, Borneo, Guam, and the Kermadecs, and has been found near Hawaii.

== Diet ==
They are thought to eat algae and detritus.
