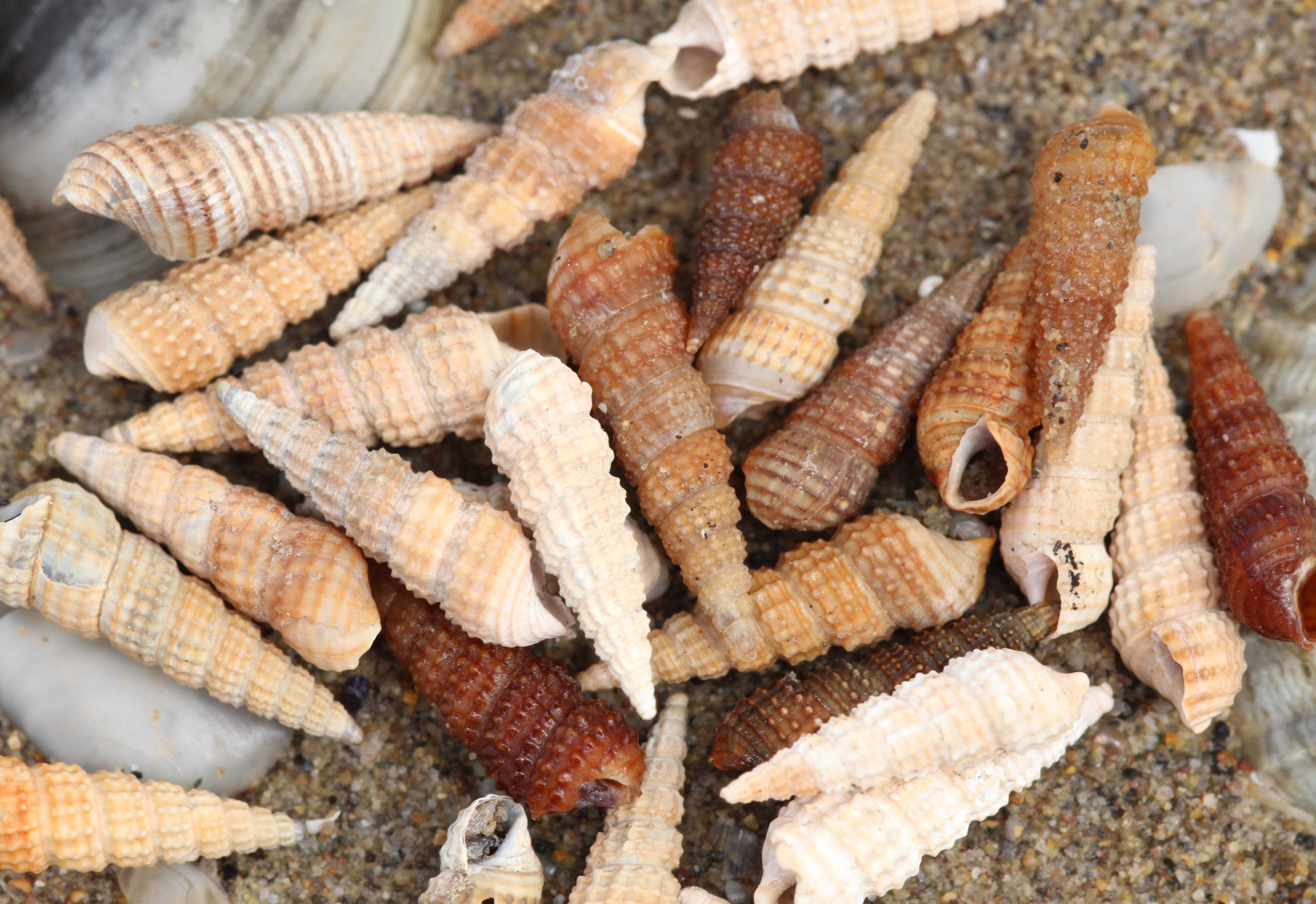
- Bittium reticulatum shells

Scientific classification
- Kingdom: Animalia
- Phylum: Mollusca
- Class: Gastropoda
- Subclass: Caenogastropoda
- Order: incertae sedis
- Family: Cerithiidae
- Genus: Bittium
- Species: B. reticulatum

Binomial name
- Bittium reticulatum (da Costa, 1778)

Synonyms
- Bittium jadertinum Brusina, 1865; Bittium scabrum (Olivi, 1792); Cerithium lacteum Philippi, 1836; Cerithium latreillei Payraudeau, 1826; Cerithium reticulatum (da Costa, 1778); Murex reticulatus (da Costa, 1778); Strombiformis reticulatus da Costa, 1778

= Bittium reticulatum =

Species of mollusc

Bittium reticulatum is a species of sea snail, a marine gastropod mollusk in the family Cerithiidae.

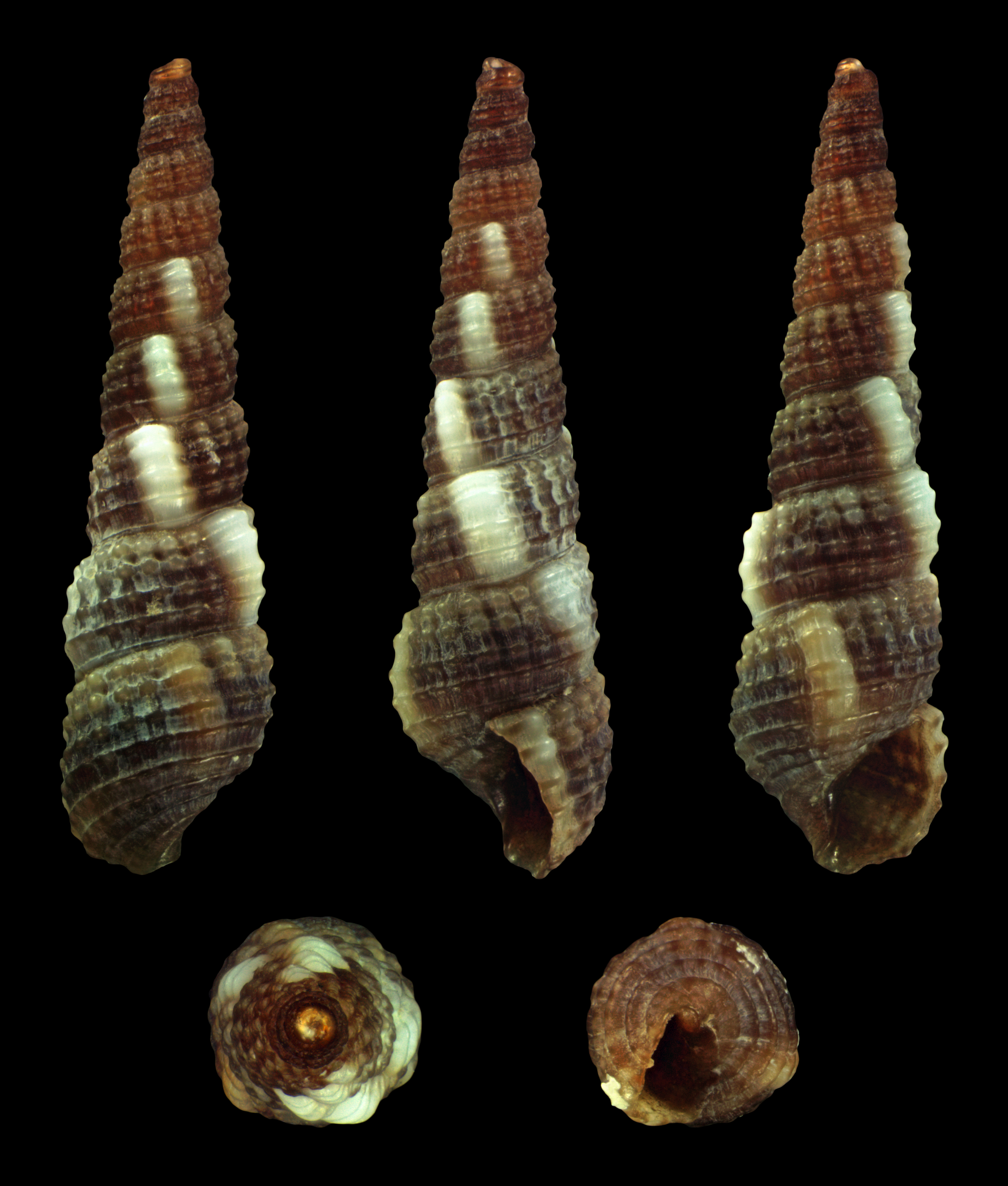
forma antonium

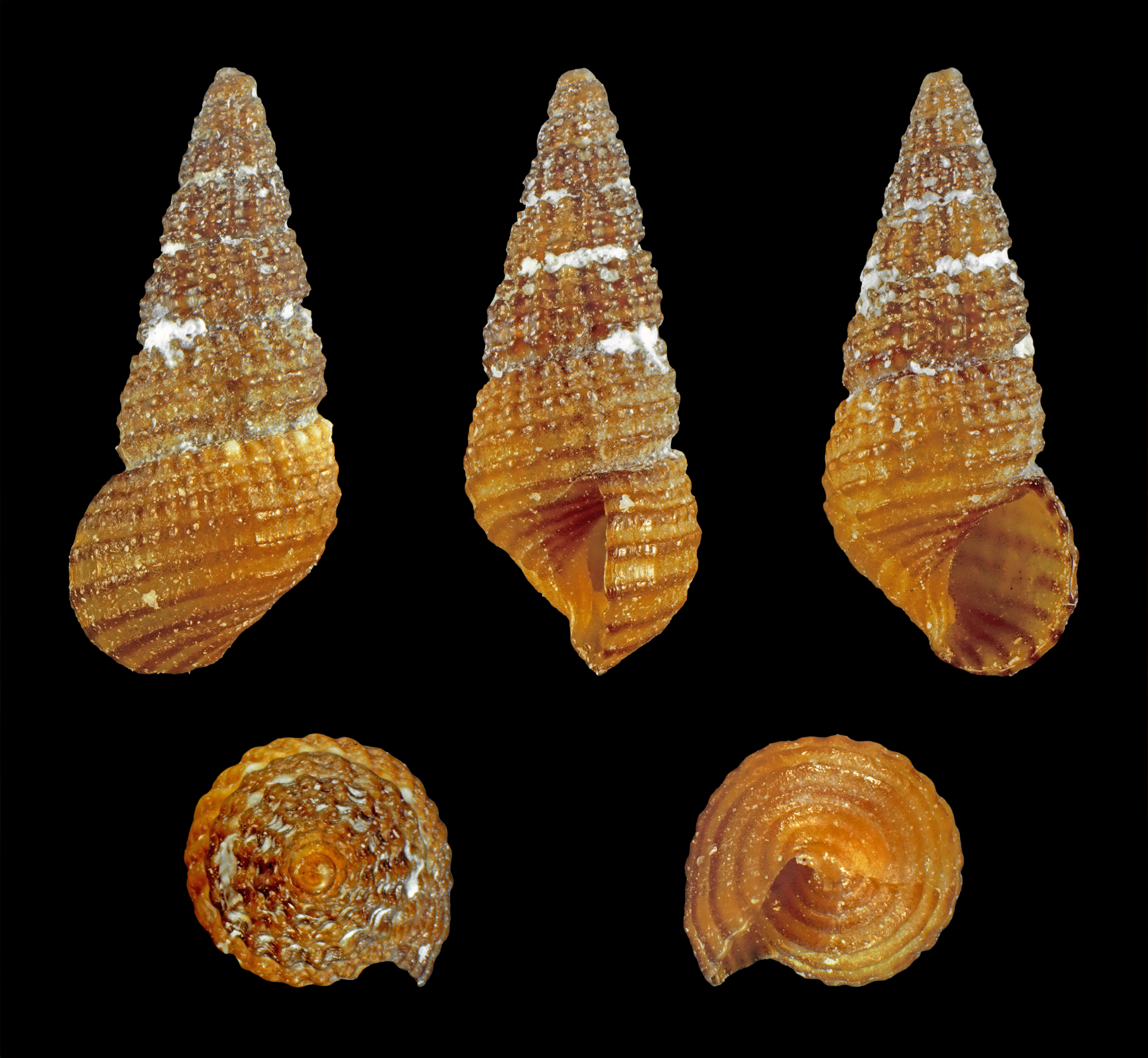
forma scabroides

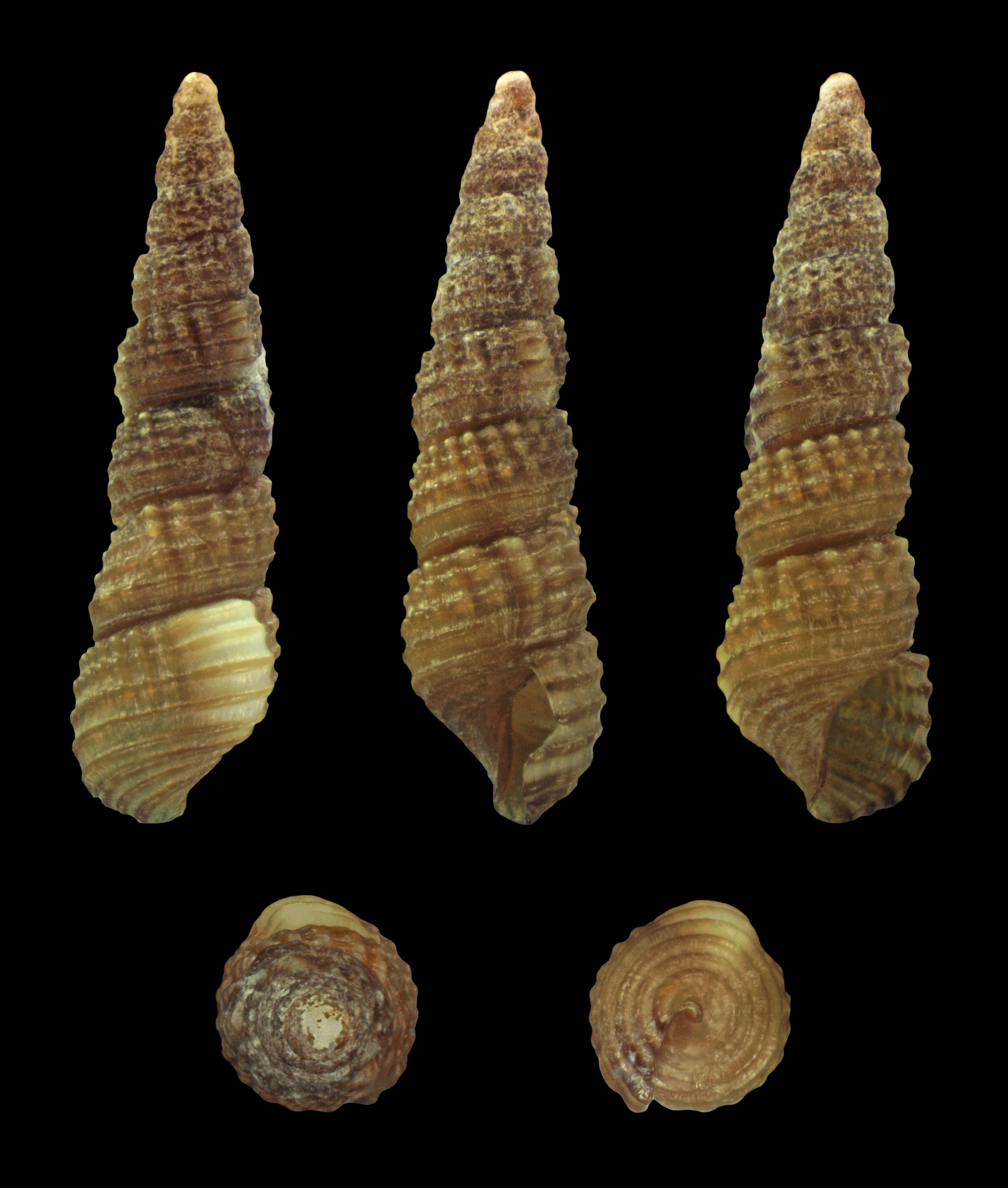
forma scabrum
