= Bittium pupiforme =

Scientific classification
- Kingdom: Animalia
- Phylum: Mollusca
- Class: Gastropoda
- Subclass: Caenogastropoda
- Order: incertae sedis
- Family: Cerithiidae
- Genus: Bittium
- Species: B. pupiforme

Binomial name
- Bittium pupiforme (Watson, 1880)

Synonyms
- Cerithium (Bittium) pupiforme Watson, 1880

Species of gastropod

Bittium pupiforme is a species of sea snail, a marine gastropod mollusk in the family Cerithiidae.
