= Varicopeza crystallina =

Scientific classification
- Kingdom: Animalia
- Phylum: Mollusca
- Class: Gastropoda
- Subclass: Caenogastropoda
- Order: incertae sedis
- Family: Cerithiidae
- Genus: Varicopeza
- Species: V. crystallina

Binomial name
- Varicopeza crystallina (Dall, 1881)

Synonyms
- Cerithiopsis crystallina Dall, 1881 Eumetula crystallina (Dall, 1881)

Species of gastropod

Varicopeza crystallina is a species of sea snail, a marine gastropod mollusk in the family Cerithiidae.

== Distribution ==
Western Atlantic Ocean: Bahamas.

Locally abundant in some dredge-hauls, off West coast Barbados, Antilles in 150–180 m. depth.

== Description ==
The maximum recorded shell length is 19 mm.

== Habitat ==
Minimum recorded depth is 11 m. Maximum recorded depth is 1,605 m.
