= Bittium aedonium =

Scientific classification
- Kingdom: Animalia
- Phylum: Mollusca
- Class: Gastropoda
- Subclass: Caenogastropoda
- Order: incertae sedis
- Family: Cerithiidae
- Genus: Bittium
- Species: B. aedonium

Binomial name
- Bittium aedonium (Watson, 1880)

Synonyms
- Cerithium aedonium Watson, 1880

Species of gastropod

Bittium aedonium is a species of sea snail, a marine gastropod mollusk in the family Cerithiidae.

== Description ==
The maximum recorded shell length is 4.3 mm.

== Habitat ==
Minimum recorded depth is 183 m. Maximum recorded depth is 274 m.
