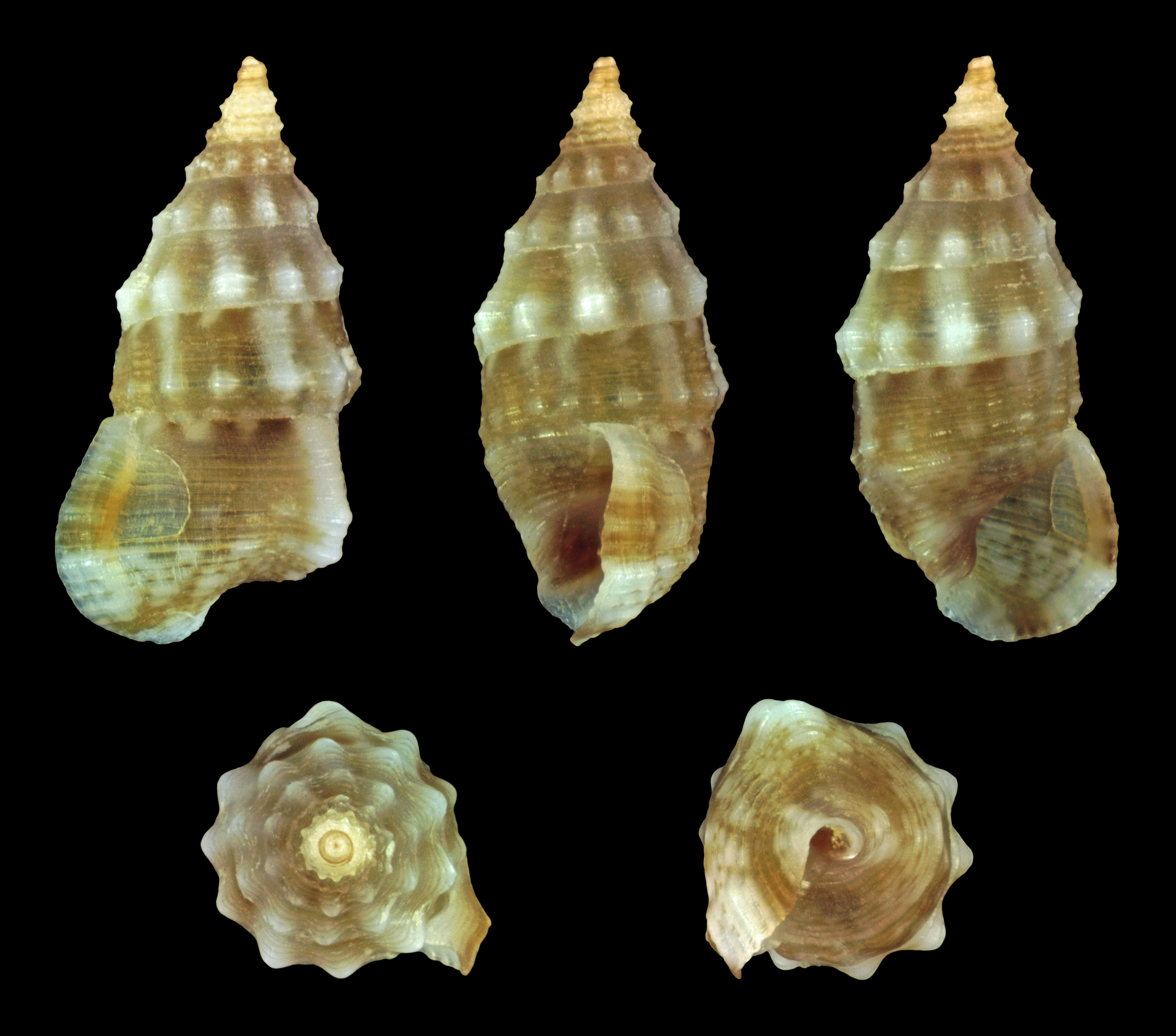

Scientific classification
- Kingdom: Animalia
- Phylum: Mollusca
- Class: Gastropoda
- Subclass: Caenogastropoda
- Order: incertae sedis
- Family: Cerithiidae
- Genus: Bittium
- Species: B. impendens

Binomial name
- Bittium impendens (Hedley, 1899)

Synonyms
- Cerithium impendens Hedley, 1899

= Bittium impendens =

Species of gastropod

Bittium impendens is a species of sea snail, a marine gastropod mollusk in the family Cerithiidae.

== Description ==
Shell size 3-4 mm.

== Distribution ==
Coral Sea-Cairns, Queensland, Australia.
