= Bittium submamillatum =

Scientific classification
- Kingdom: Animalia
- Phylum: Mollusca
- Class: Gastropoda
- Subclass: Caenogastropoda
- Order: incertae sedis
- Family: Cerithiidae
- Genus: Bittium
- Species: B. submamillatum

Binomial name
- Bittium submamillatum (de Rayneval & Ponzi, 1854)

Synonyms
- Cerithidium submamillatum (De Rayneval & Ponzi, 1854)

Species of gastropod

Bittium submamillatum is a species of sea snail, a marine gastropod mollusk in the family Cerithiidae.
