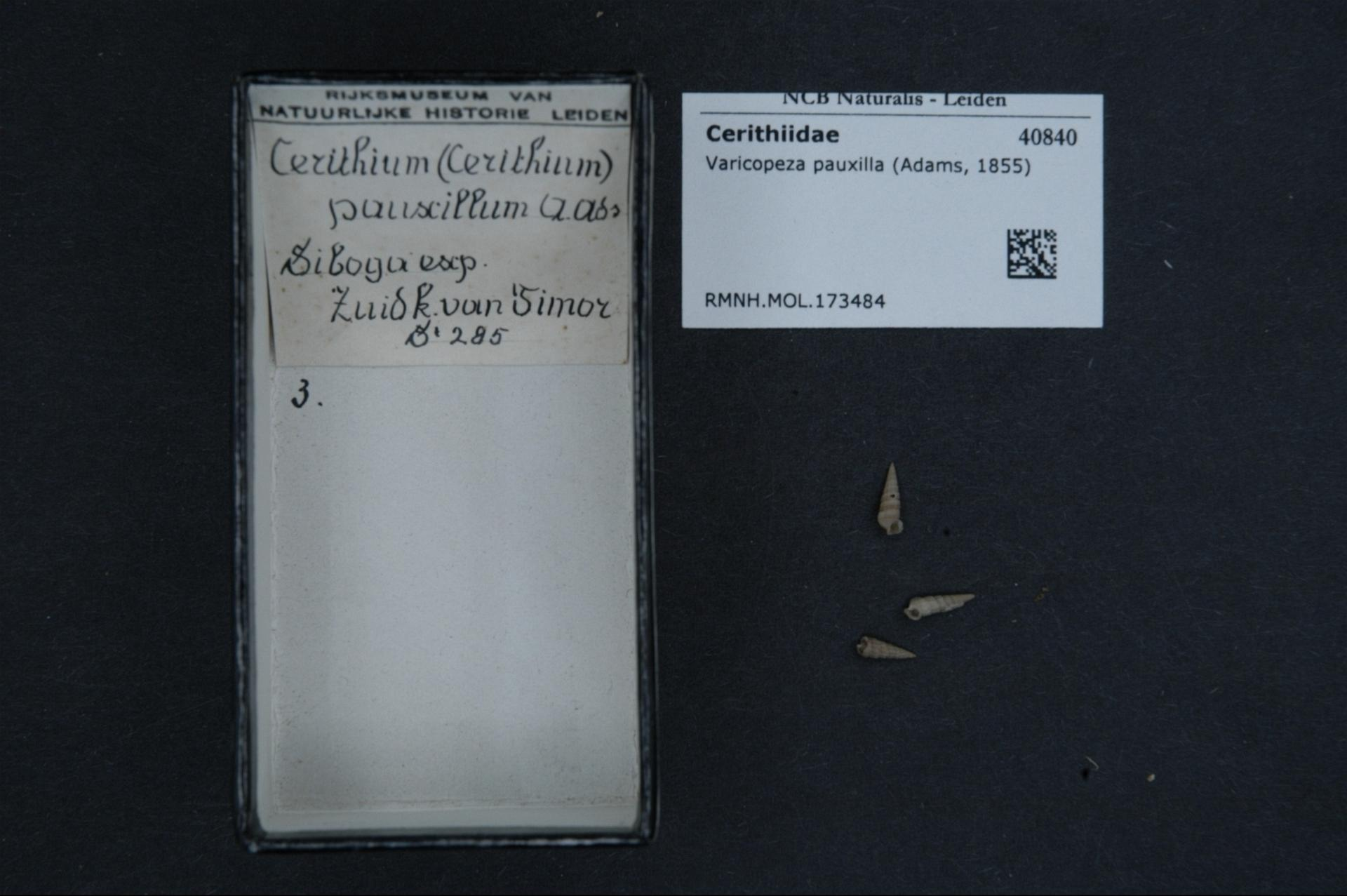

Scientific classification
- Kingdom: Animalia
- Phylum: Mollusca
- Class: Gastropoda
- Subclass: Caenogastropoda
- Order: incertae sedis
- Family: Cerithiidae
- Genus: Varicopeza
- Species: V. pauxilla

Binomial name
- Varicopeza pauxilla (A. Adams, 1855)

Synonyms
- Argyropeza involuta Thiele, 1918; Cerithidea pauxilla A. Adams, 1855; Cerithium bicanaliferum Brazier, 1877; Cerithium pauxillum (A. Adams, 1855); Cerithium trigonostomum Melvill, 1910; Varicopeza varicopeza Gründel, 1976

= Varicopeza pauxilla =

Species of gastropod

Varicopeza pauxilla is a species of sea snail, a marine gastropod mollusk in the family Cerithiidae.
