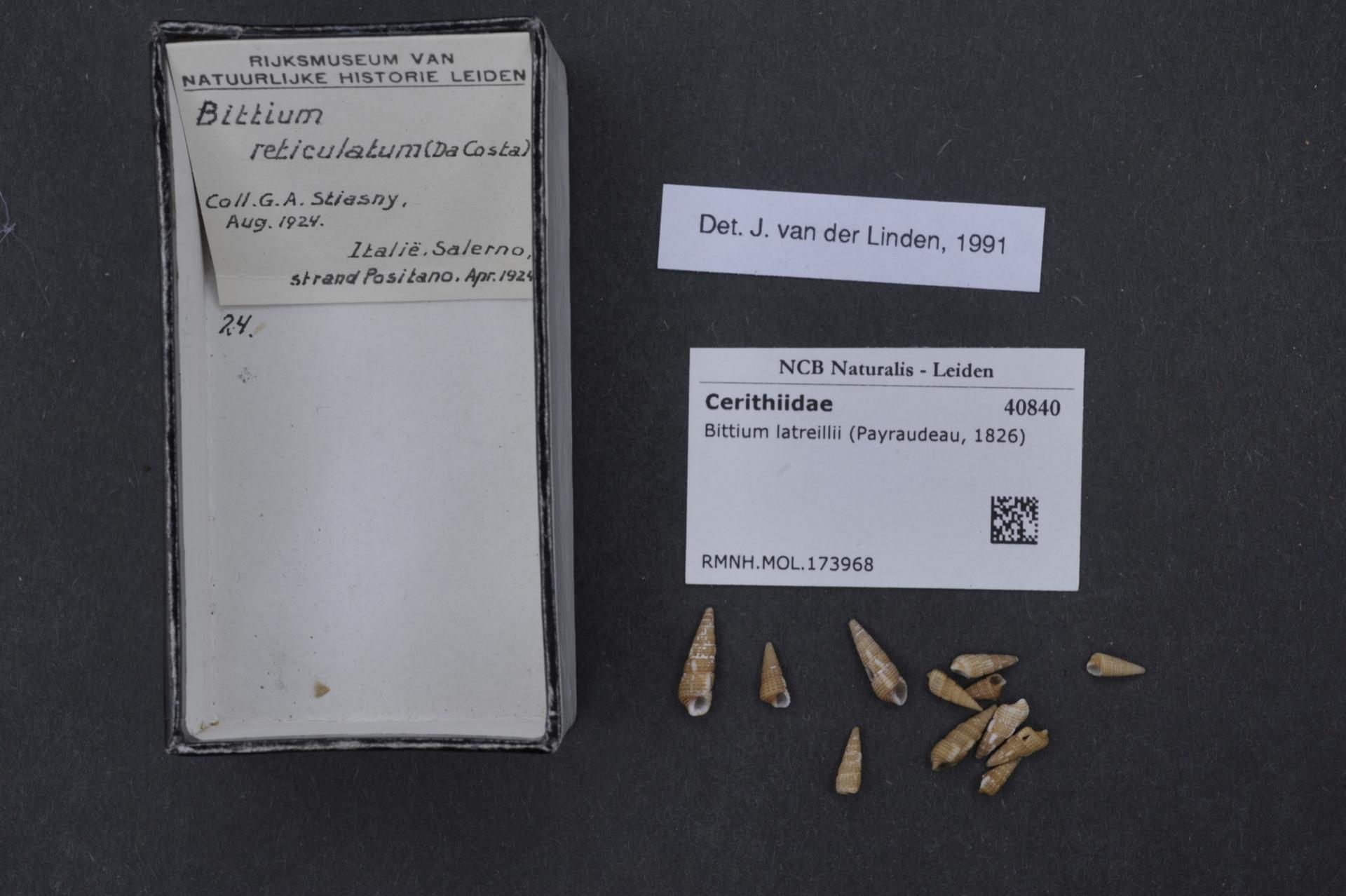

Scientific classification
- Kingdom: Animalia
- Phylum: Mollusca
- Class: Gastropoda
- Subclass: Caenogastropoda
- Order: incertae sedis
- Family: Cerithiidae
- Genus: Bittium
- Species: B. latreillii

Binomial name
- Bittium latreillii (Payraudeau, 1826)

= Bittium latreillii =

Species of gastropod

Bittium latreillii is a species of sea snail, a marine gastropod mollusk in the family Cerithiidae.
