= Bittium insulsum =

Scientific classification
- Kingdom: Animalia
- Phylum: Mollusca
- Class: Gastropoda
- Subclass: Caenogastropoda
- Order: incertae sedis
- Family: Cerithiidae
- Genus: Bittium
- Species: B. insulsum

Binomial name
- Bittium insulsum Preston, 1908

Species of gastropod

Bittium insulsum is a species of sea snail, a marine gastropod mollusk in the family Cerithiidae.
