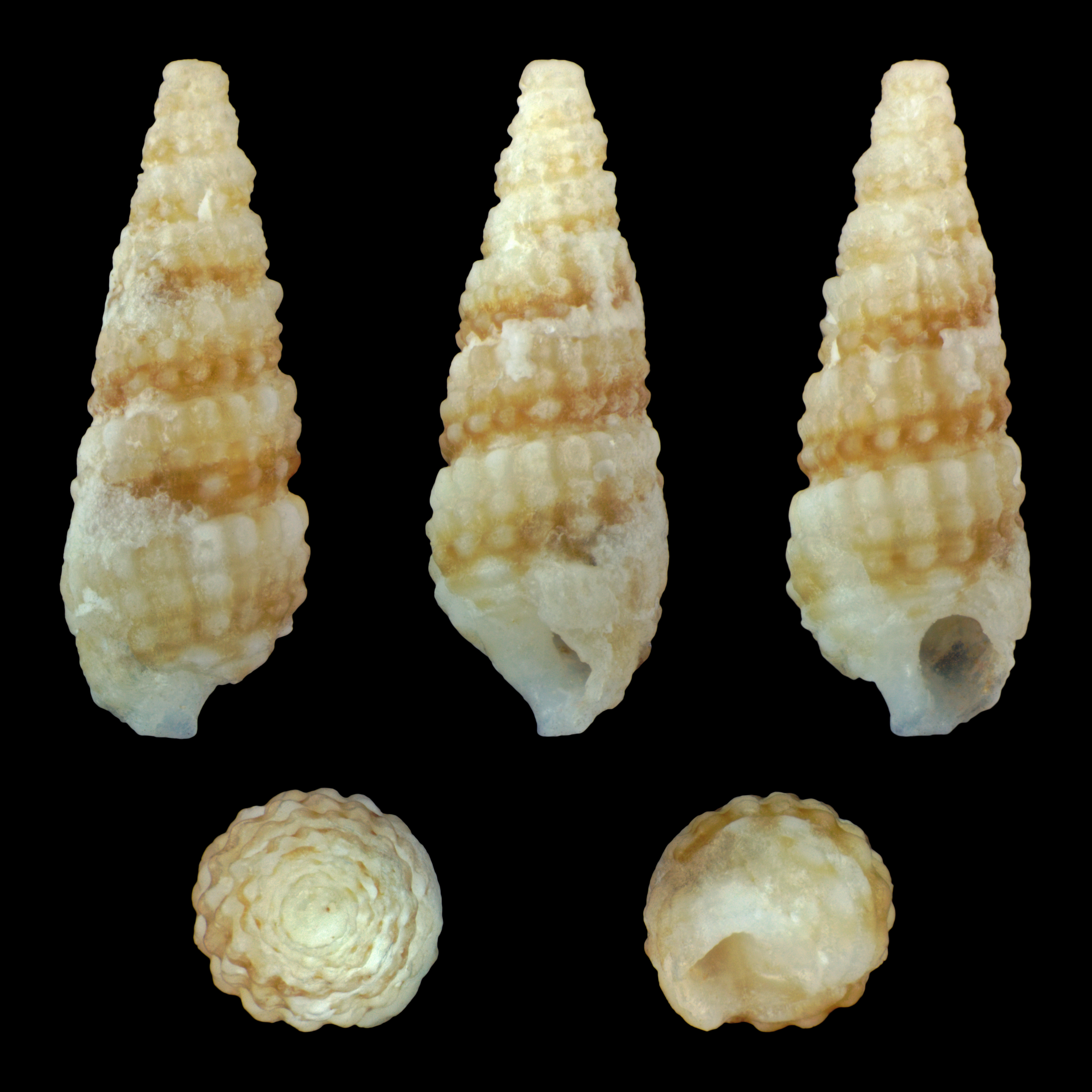

Scientific classification
- Kingdom: Animalia
- Phylum: Mollusca
- Class: Gastropoda
- Subclass: Caenogastropoda
- Order: incertae sedis
- Family: Cerithiidae
- Genus: Bittium
- Species: B. incile

Binomial name
- Bittium incile Watson, 1897

= Bittium incile =

Species of gastropod

Bittium incile is a species of sea snail, a marine gastropod mollusk in the family Cerithiidae.
