= Bittium lacteum =

Scientific classification
- Kingdom: Animalia
- Phylum: Mollusca
- Class: Gastropoda
- Subclass: Caenogastropoda
- Order: incertae sedis
- Family: Cerithiidae
- Genus: Bittium
- Species: B. lacteum

Binomial name
- Bittium lacteum (Philippi, 1836)

Species of gastropod

Bittium lacteum is a species of sea snail, a marine gastropod mollusk in the family Cerithiidae.
