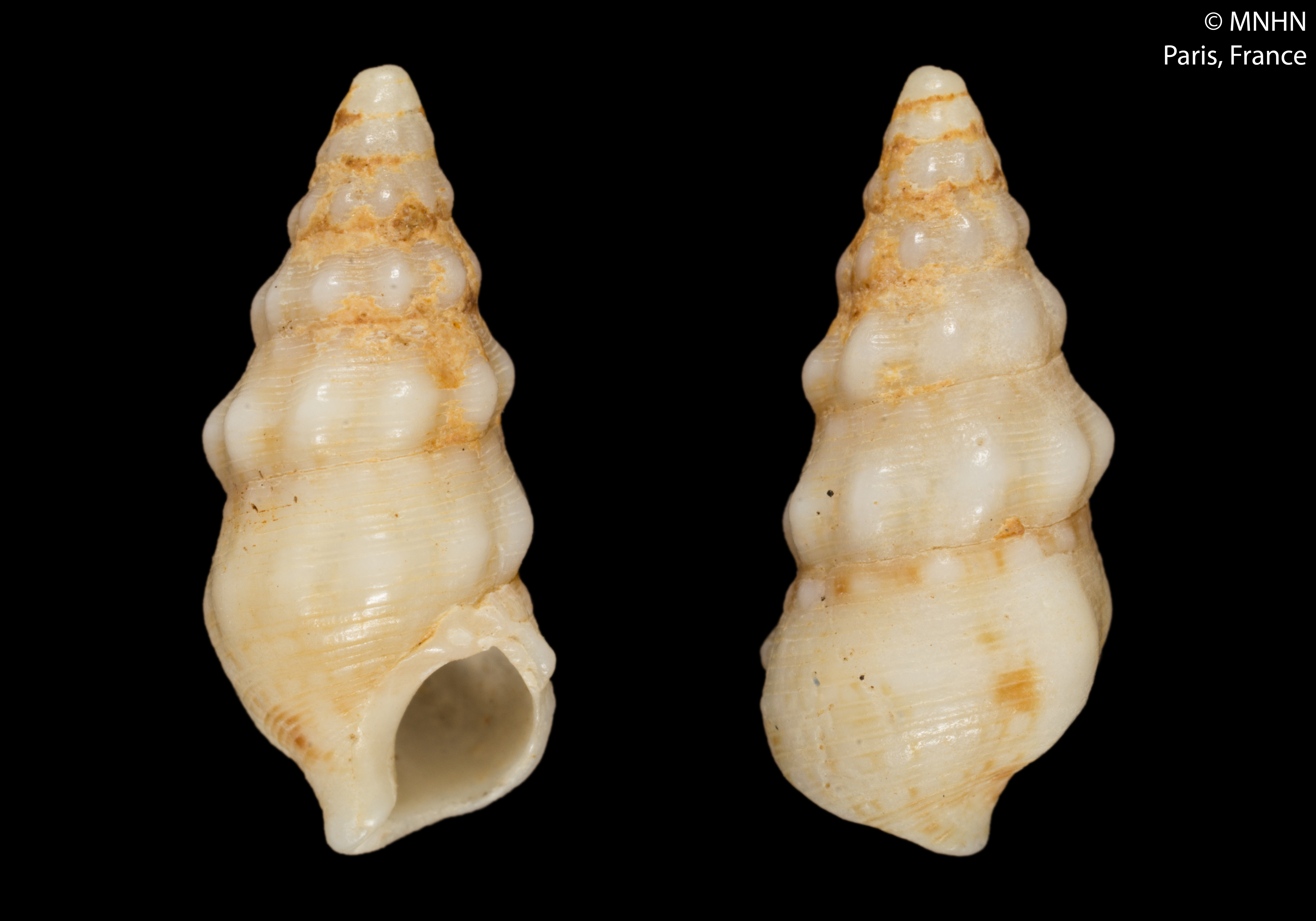

Scientific classification
- Kingdom: Animalia
- Phylum: Mollusca
- Class: Gastropoda
- Subclass: Caenogastropoda
- Order: incertae sedis
- Family: Cerithiidae
- Genus: Cerithium
- Species: C. renovatum

Binomial name
- Cerithium renovatum Monterosato, 1884

Synonyms
- Cerithium (Hirtocerithium) phaeniciacum Pallary, 1938 (dubious synonym); Cerithium payraudeaui Locard & Caziot, 1900; Cerithium vulgatum var. pulchella Philippi, 1836

= Cerithium renovatum =

Species of gastropod

Cerithium renovatum is a species of sea snail, a marine gastropod mollusk in the family Cerithiidae.
