= Bittium proteum =

Scientific classification
- Kingdom: Animalia
- Phylum: Mollusca
- Class: Gastropoda
- Subclass: Caenogastropoda
- Order: incertae sedis
- Family: Cerithiidae
- Genus: Bittium
- Species: B. proteum

Binomial name
- Bittium proteum (Jousseaume, 1930)

Synonyms
- Cerithium proteum Jousseaume, 1930; Dahlakia jugosa Biggs, 1971; Dahlakia leilae Biggs, 1971; Dahlakia pirenelloides Biggs, 1971; Dahlakia proteum (Jousseaume, 1930); Dahlakia striata Biggs, 1971; Litiopa bucciniformis Hornung & Mermod, 1926

Species of gastropod

Bittium proteum is a species of sea snail, a marine gastropod mollusk in the family Cerithiidae.

== Description ==
The shell size varies between 5 mm and 7 mm

== Distribution ==
This species is distributed in the Red Sea, the Gulf of Aden and the Mediterranean Sea
