= Royella sinon =

Scientific classification
- Kingdom: Animalia
- Phylum: Mollusca
- Class: Gastropoda
- Subclass: Caenogastropoda
- Order: incertae sedis
- Family: Cerithiidae
- Genus: Royella
- Species: R. sinon

Binomial name
- Royella sinon (Bayle, 1880)

Synonyms
- Cerithiopsis sinon (Bayle, 1880); Cerithium (Pirenella) clathratum A. Adams in G.B. Sowerby II, 1855; Cerithium clathratum A. Adams in G.B. Sowerby II, 1855; Cerithium sinon Bayle, 1880

Species of gastropod

Royella sinon is a species of sea snail, a marine gastropod mollusk in the family Cerithiidae.
