= Cerithioclava garciai =

Scientific classification
- Kingdom: Animalia
- Phylum: Mollusca
- Class: Gastropoda
- Subclass: Caenogastropoda
- Order: incertae sedis
- Family: Cerithiidae
- Genus: Cerithioclava
- Species: C. garciai

Binomial name
- Cerithioclava garciai Houbrick, 1986

Species of gastropod

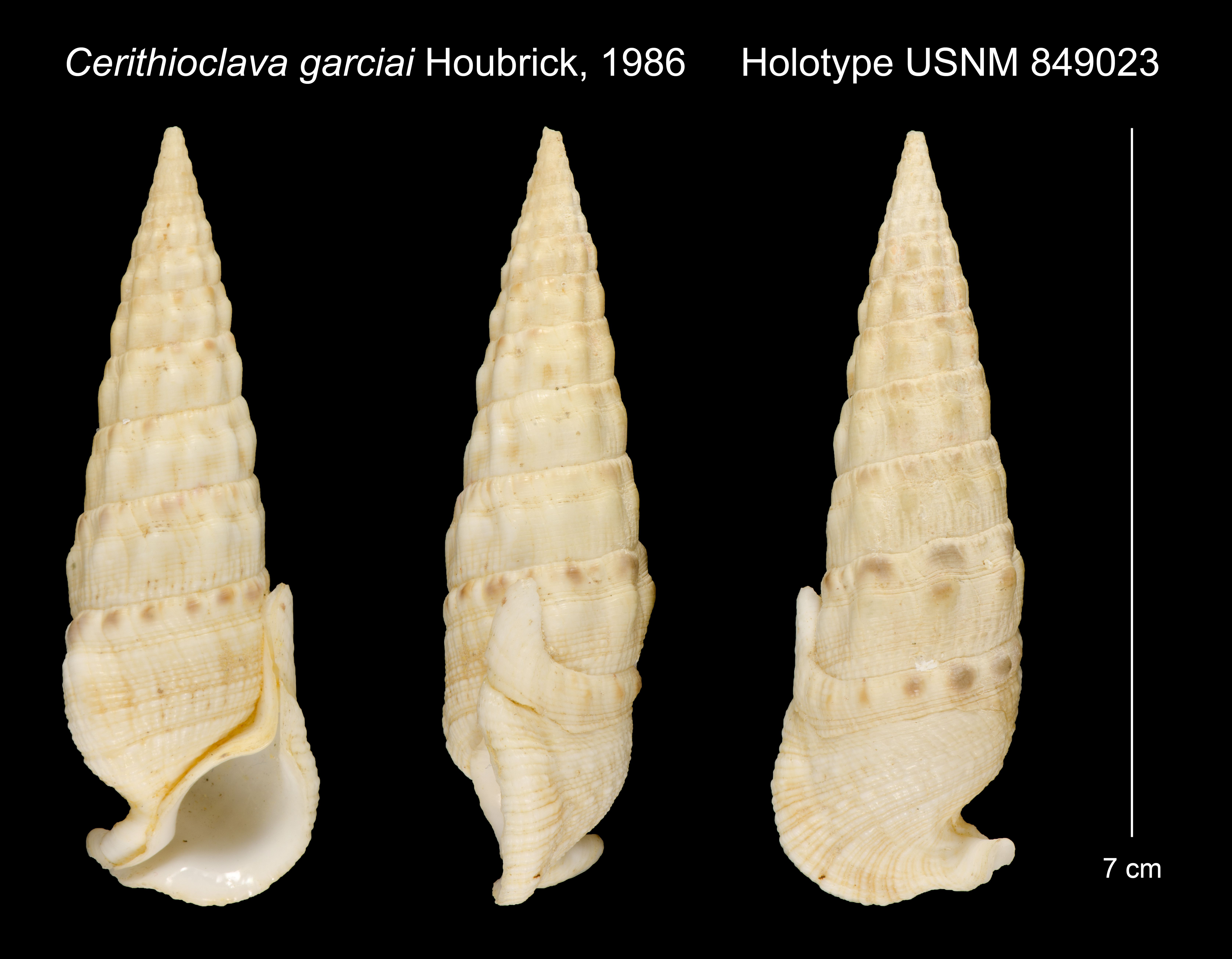
Cerithioclava garciai

Cerithioclava garciai is a species of sea snail, a marine gastropod mollusk in the family Cerithiidae.

== Description ==
The maximum recorded shell length is 92 mm.

== Habitat ==
Minimum recorded depth is 0 m. Maximum recorded depth is 24 m.
