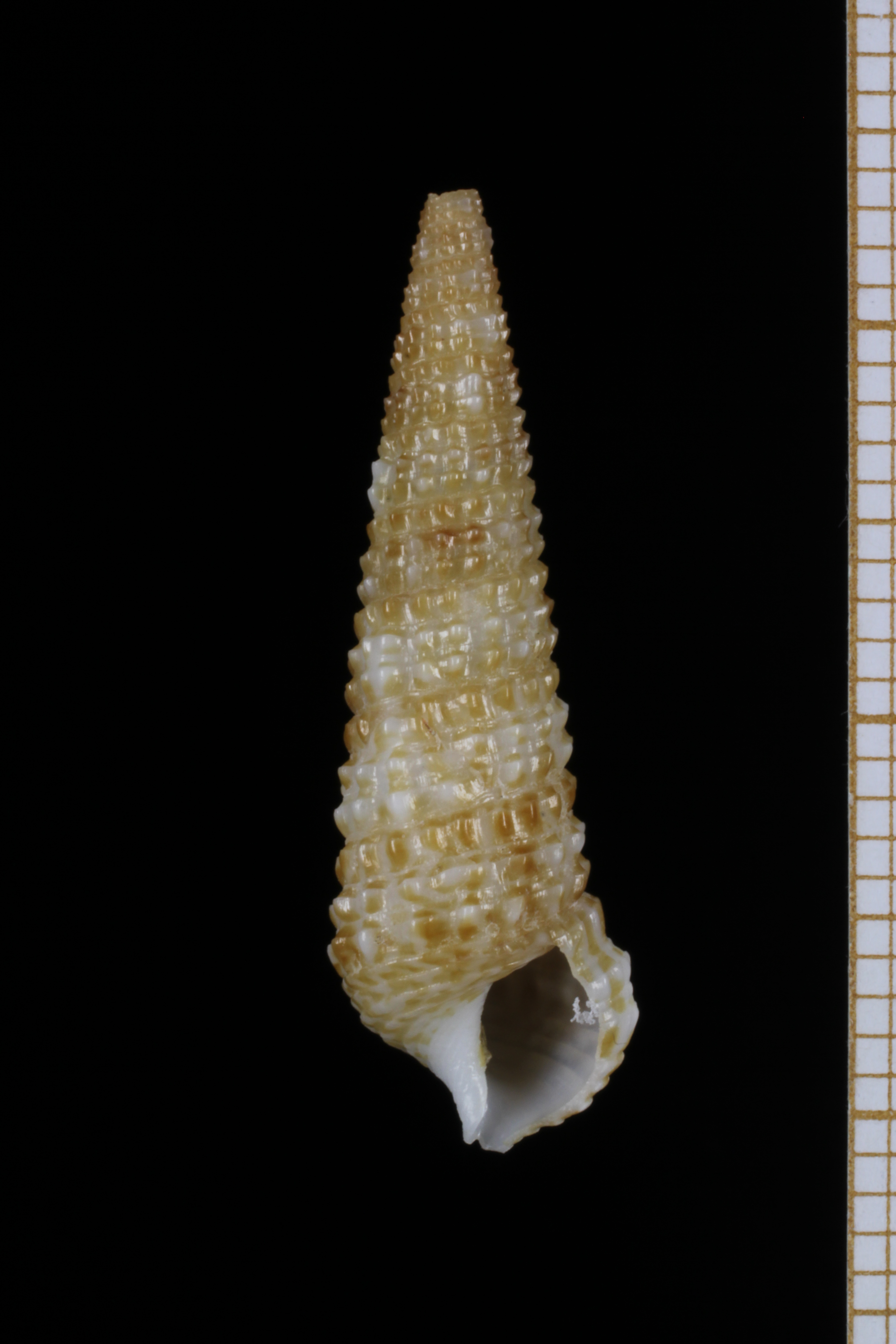

Scientific classification
- Kingdom: Animalia
- Phylum: Mollusca
- Class: Gastropoda
- Subclass: Caenogastropoda
- Order: incertae sedis
- Family: Cerithiidae
- Genus: Cerithium
- Species: C. ophioderma

Binomial name
- Cerithium ophioderma (Habe, 1968)

Synonyms
- Proclava ophioderma Habe, 1968; Rhinoclavis (Proclava) ophioderma (Habe, 1968)

= Cerithium ophioderma =

Species of gastropod

Cerithium ophioderma is a species of sea snail, a marine gastropod mollusk in the family Cerithiidae.

== Distribution ==
The distribution of Cerithium ophioderma includes the Western Central Pacific.

- Philippines
- Japan
