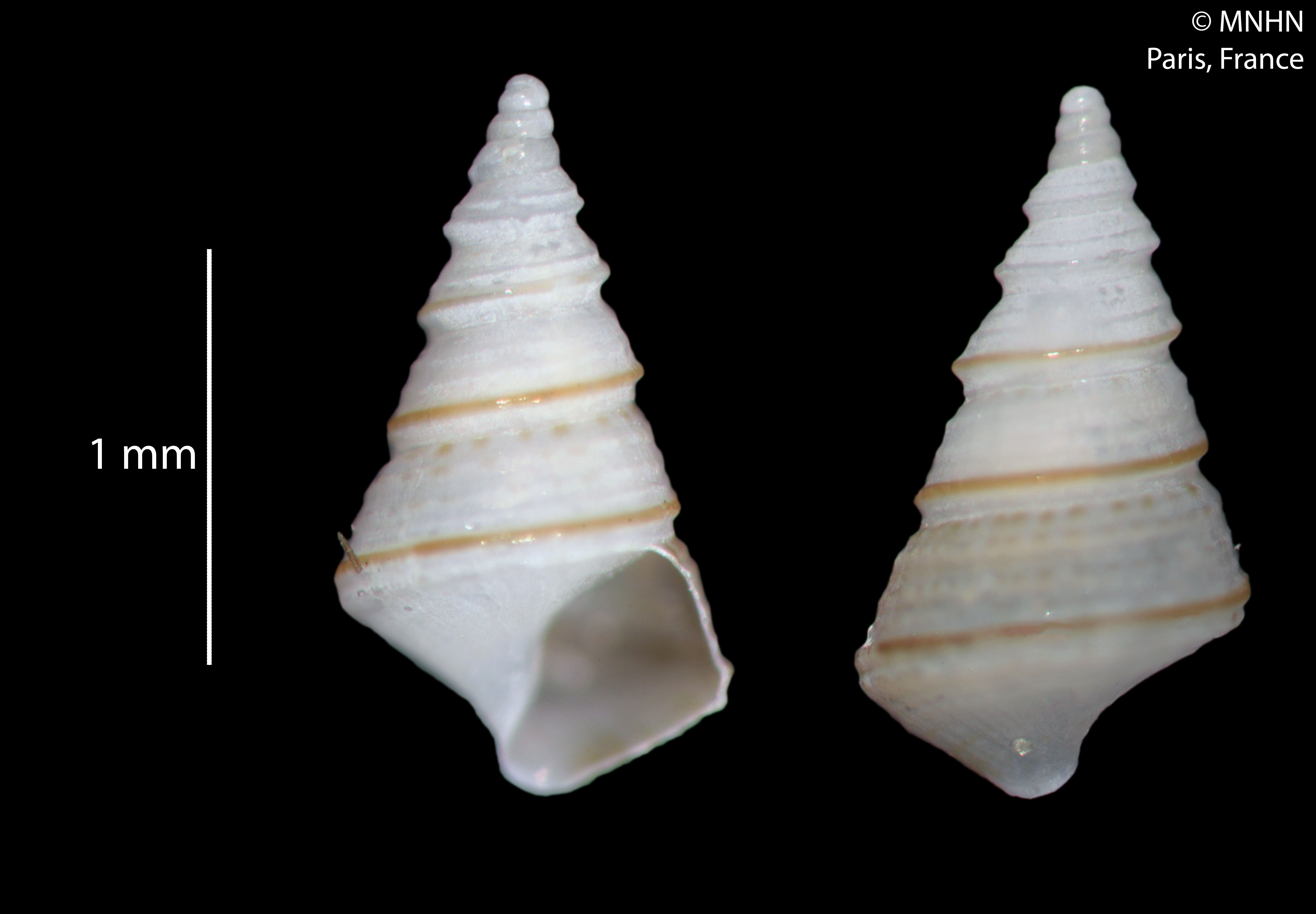
- Shell of Pictorium koperbergi (specimen at MNHN, Paris)

Scientific classification
- Kingdom: Animalia
- Phylum: Mollusca
- Class: Gastropoda
- Subclass: Caenogastropoda
- Order: incertae sedis
- Superfamily: Cerithioidea
- Family: Cerithiidae
- Genus: Pictorium
- Species: P. koperbergi

Binomial name
- Pictorium koperbergi (Schepman, 1907)

Synonyms
- † Cerithium koperbergi Schepman, 1907 (original combination)

= Pictorium koperbergi =

Species of gastropod

Pictorium koperbergi is a species of sea snail, a marine gastropod mollusk in the family Cerithiidae.

== Distribution ==
The distribution of Pictorium koperbergi includes the Western Central Pacific.

- Philippines
