= Fastigiella carinata =

Scientific classification
- Kingdom: Animalia
- Phylum: Mollusca
- Class: Gastropoda
- Subclass: Caenogastropoda
- Order: incertae sedis
- Family: Cerithiidae
- Genus: Fastigiella
- Species: F. carinata

Binomial name
- Fastigiella carinata Reeve, 1848

Synonyms
- Fastigiella poulsenii Mörch, 1877

Species of gastropod

Fastigiella carinata is a species of sea snail, a marine gastropod mollusk in the family Cerithiidae.

== Description ==
The maximum recorded shell length is 53 mm.

The shell is elongately turreted and is umbilicated. The whorls are rounded. The aperture is small. The siphonal canal is very short. The columella is somewhat twisted.

== Habitat ==
Minimum recorded depth is 0 m. Maximum recorded depth is 1 m.
