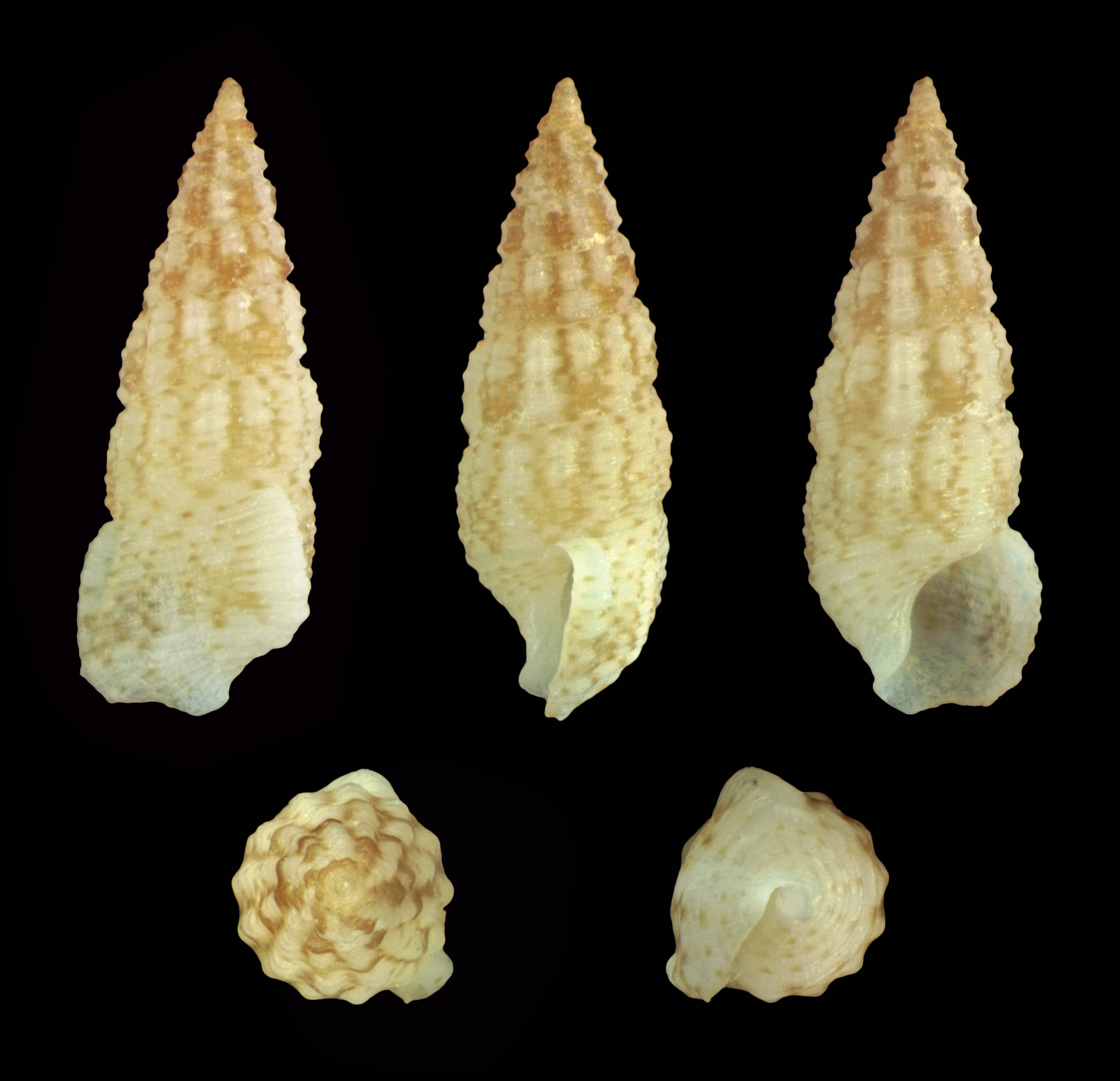

Scientific classification
- Kingdom: Animalia
- Phylum: Mollusca
- Class: Gastropoda
- Subclass: Caenogastropoda
- Order: incertae sedis
- Family: Cerithiidae
- Genus: Bittium
- Species: B. elegantissimum

Binomial name
- Bittium elegantissimum (Hedley, 1899)

Synonyms
- Bittium torresiense Melvill & Standen, 1899; Cerithium elegantissmum Hedley, 1899

= Bittium elegantissimum =

Species of gastropod

Bittium elegantissimum is a species of sea snail, a marine gastropod mollusk in the family Cerithiidae.
