= Cassiella abylensis =

Scientific classification
- Kingdom: Animalia
- Phylum: Mollusca
- Class: Gastropoda
- Subclass: Caenogastropoda
- Order: incertae sedis
- Family: Cerithiidae
- Genus: Cassiella
- Species: C. abylensis

Binomial name
- Cassiella abylensis Gofas, 1987

Species of gastropod

Cassiella abylensis is a species of sea snail, a marine gastropod mollusk in the family Cerithiidae.
