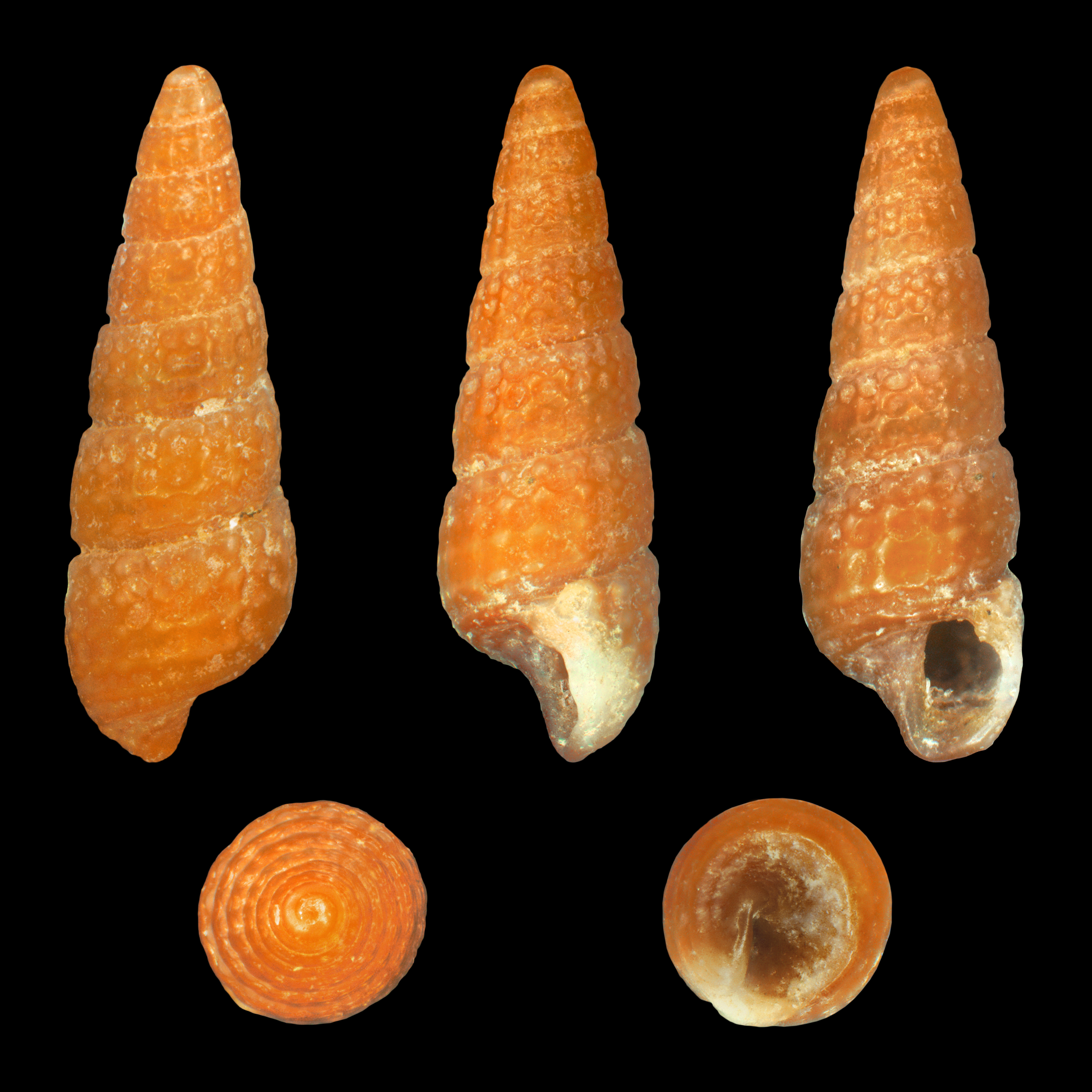

Scientific classification
- Kingdom: Animalia
- Phylum: Mollusca
- Class: Gastropoda
- Subclass: Caenogastropoda
- Order: incertae sedis
- Family: Cerithiidae
- Genus: Bittium
- Species: B. glareosum

Binomial name
- Bittium glareosum Gould, 1861

= Bittium glareosum =

Species of gastropod

Bittium glareosum is a species of sea snail, a marine gastropod mollusk in the family Cerithiidae.
