= Cerithium madreporicola =

Scientific classification
- Kingdom: Animalia
- Phylum: Mollusca
- Class: Gastropoda
- Subclass: Caenogastropoda
- Order: incertae sedis
- Family: Cerithiidae
- Genus: Cerithium
- Species: C. madreporicola

Binomial name
- Cerithium madreporicola Jousseaume, 1930

Synonyms
- Cerithium madreporicolum

Species of gastropod

Cerithium madreporicola is a species of sea snail, a marine gastropod mollusk in the family Cerithiidae.

The true Cerithium madreporicola is a fossil species known only from raised Quaternary reefs in the Red Sea. The name has been applied in error to a Recent species from the Philippines and Indonesia, which has later been named as Cerithium kreukelorum.

== Distribution ==
The distribution of Cerithium madreporicola includes the Red Sea.
