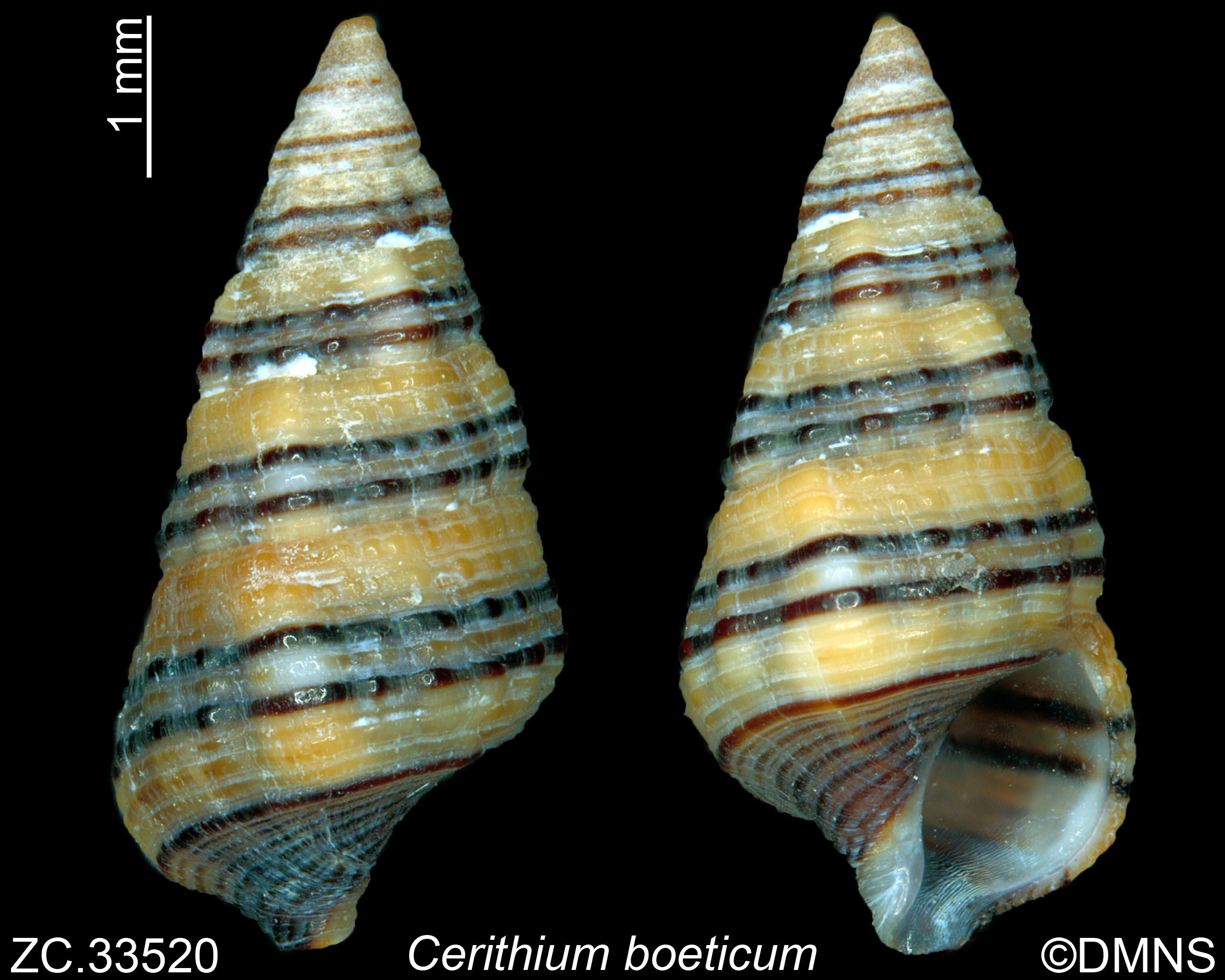
- Shells

Scientific classification
- Kingdom: Animalia
- Phylum: Mollusca
- Class: Gastropoda
- Subclass: Caenogastropoda
- Order: incertae sedis
- Family: Cerithiidae
- Genus: Cerithium
- Species: C. boeticum

Binomial name
- Cerithium boeticum Pease, 1860

Synonyms
- Bittium boeticum (Pease, 1860); Bittium pusillum (Gould, 1851); Cerithium pusillum Gould, 1851

= Cerithium boeticum =

Species of gastropod

Cerithium boeticum is a species of sea snail, a marine gastropod mollusk in the family Cerithiidae.
