= Cerithium muscarum =

- Cerithium muscarum shell

Scientific classification
- Kingdom: Animalia
- Phylum: Mollusca
- Class: Gastropoda
- Subclass: Caenogastropoda
- Order: incertae sedis
- Family: Cerithiidae
- Genus: Cerithium
- Species: C. muscarum

Binomial name
- Cerithium muscarum Say, 1832

Synonyms
- Cerithium (Vertagus) stercusmuscarum Mörch, 1876; Cerithium (Vertagus) stercusmuscarum var. minor Mörch, 1876; Cerithium callisoma Dall, 1892; Cerithium muscarum pacei Petuch, 1987; Cerithium muscarum var. protracta Vignal, 1902; Cerithium notatum Menke, 1828; Thericium chara Pilsbry, 1949

Species of gastropod

Cerithium muscarum, also known as the flyspeck cerith, is a species of sea snail in the family Cerithiidae.

== Distribution ==
The distribution of Cerithium muscarum includes the Western Central Atlantic, the Gulf of Mexico, and the Caribbean:

- USA
- Mexico
- Cuba
- Jamaica
- Belize
- Honduras

50 second video of snails (most likely Natica chemnitzi and Cerithium muscarum) feeding on the sea floor in the Gulf of California, Puerto Peñasco, Mexico

== Description ==
The maximum recorded shell length is 26 mm (1.0 in).

== Habitat ==
Cerithium muscarum has been recorded at depths between 0 and 18 m (0 and 59 ft).
