= Lirobittium quadrifilatum =

Scientific classification
- Kingdom: Animalia
- Phylum: Mollusca
- Class: Gastropoda
- Subclass: Caenogastropoda
- Order: incertae sedis
- Family: Cerithiidae
- Genus: Lirobittium
- Species: L. quadrifilatum

Binomial name
- Lirobittium quadrifilatum (Carpenter, 1864)

Synonyms
- Bittium quadrifilatum Carpenter, 1864 (original combination)

Species of mollusc

Lirobittium quadrifilatum is a species of small sea snail, a marine gastropod mollusc in the family Cerithiidae.
