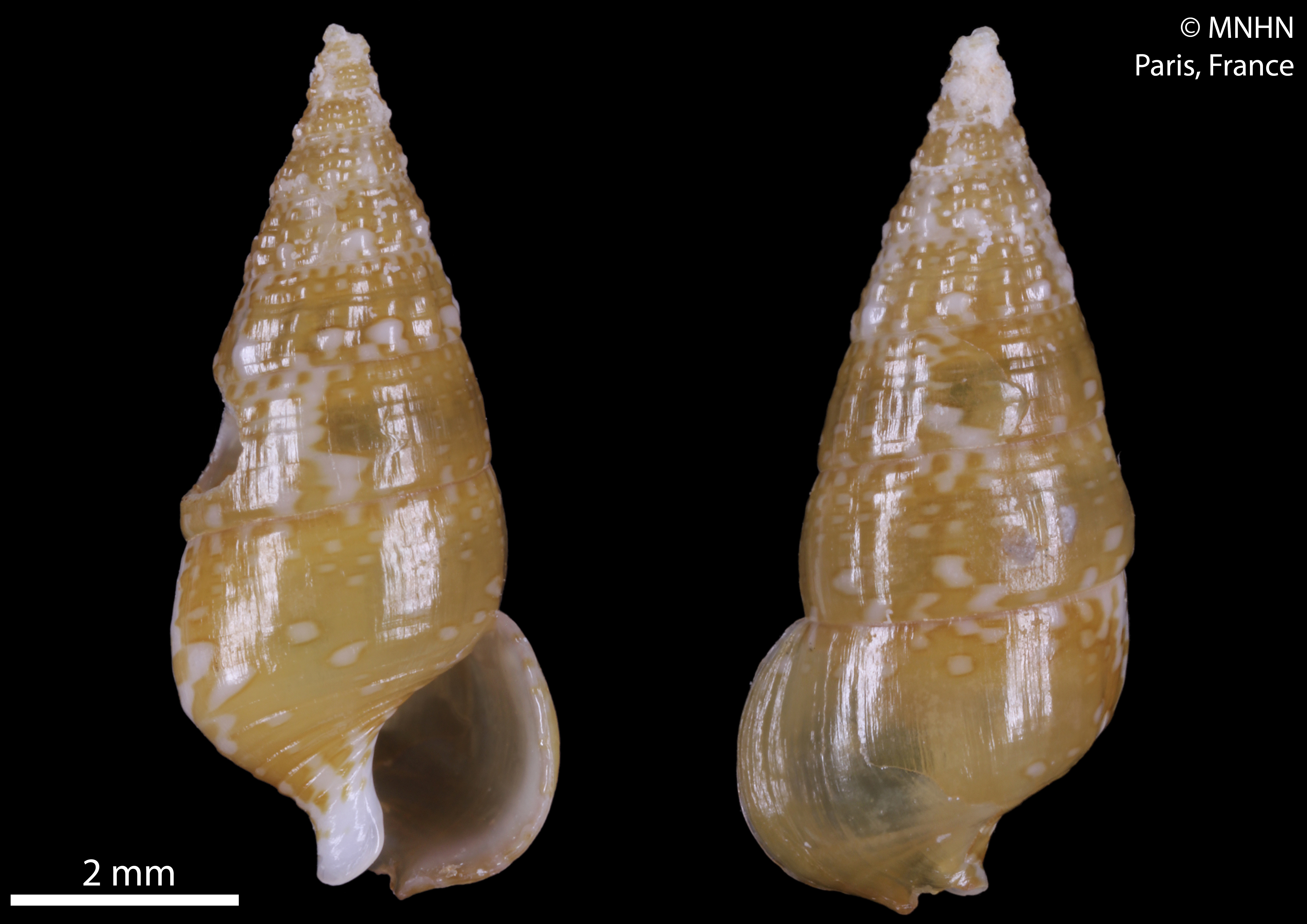
- Shell of Limatium aureum (holotype at MNHN, Paris)

Scientific classification
- Kingdom: Animalia
- Phylum: Mollusca
- Class: Gastropoda
- Subclass: Caenogastropoda
- Order: incertae sedis
- Superfamily: Cerithioidea
- Family: Cerithiidae
- Genus: Limatium; E. E. Strong & Bouchet, 2018

Type species
- Limatium pagodula E. E. Strong & Bouchet, 2018

Species
- See text

= Limatium =

Genus of gastropods

Ittibittium is a genus of very small sea snails, marine gastropod mollusks in the family Cerithiidae.

== Species ==
- Limatium aureum E. E. Strong & Bouchet, 2018
- Limatium pagodula E. E. Strong & Bouchet, 2018
