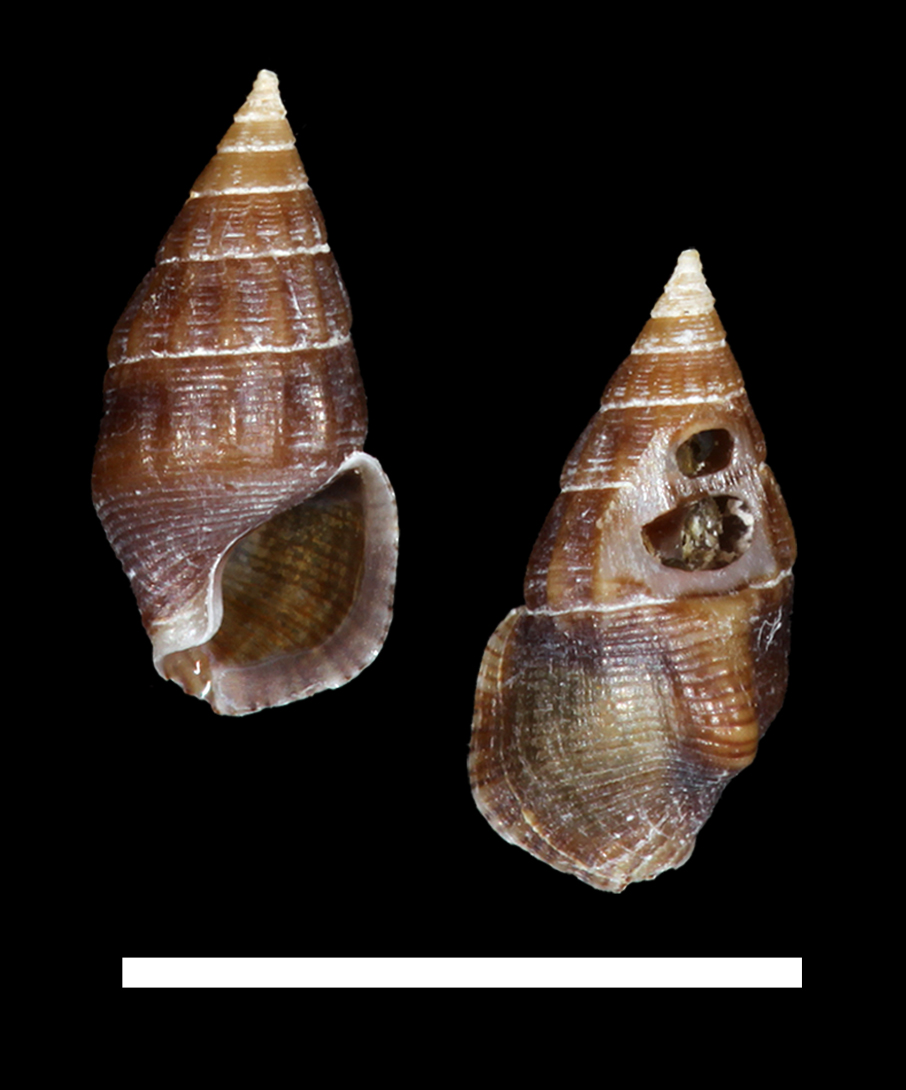
- Shell of Pictorium versicolor (holotype at MNHN, Paris)

Scientific classification
- Kingdom: Animalia
- Phylum: Mollusca
- Class: Gastropoda
- Subclass: Caenogastropoda
- Order: incertae sedis
- Family: Cerithiidae
- Genus: Pictorium; E. E. Strong & Bouchet, 2013

Type species
- † Cerithium koperbergi Schepman, 1907

= Pictorium (gastropod) =

Genus of gastropods

Pictorium is a genus of sea snails, marine gastropod molluscs in the subfamily Bittiinae of the family Cerithiidae.

== Species ==
Species within the genus Pictorium include:

- Pictorium koperbergi (Schepman, 1907)
- Pictorium versicolor E. E. Strong & Bouchet, 2013
- Pictorium violaceum E. E. Strong & Bouchet, 2013
