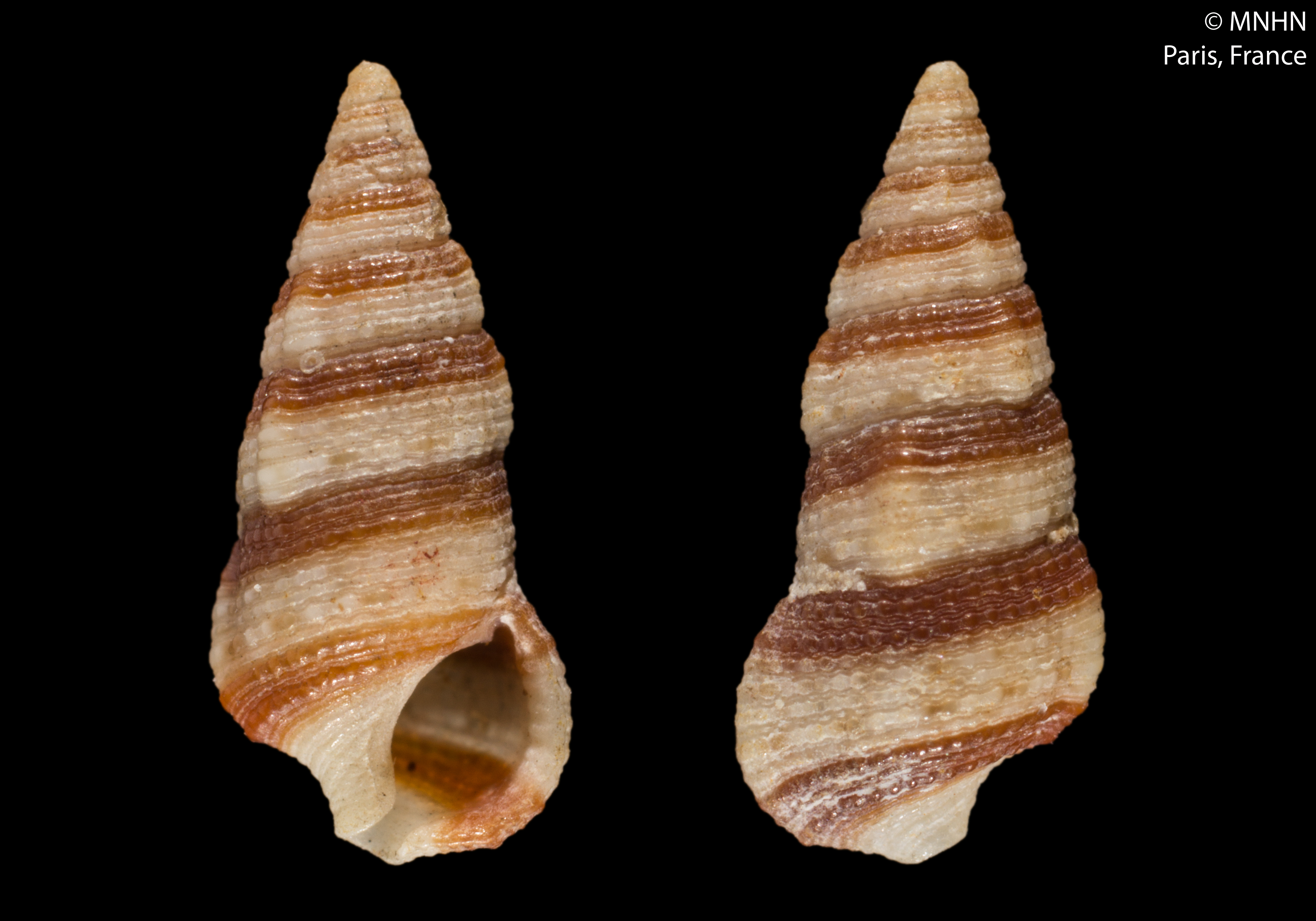
- Shell of Cerithium zebrum (syntype at MNHN, Paris)

Scientific classification
- Kingdom: Animalia
- Phylum: Mollusca
- Class: Gastropoda
- Subclass: Caenogastropoda
- Order: incertae sedis
- Family: Cerithiidae
- Genus: Cerithium
- Species: C. zebrum

Binomial name
- Cerithium zebrum Kiener, 1841

Synonyms
- Bittium zebrum (Kiener, 1841); Cerithium aspersum Deshayes, 1863; Cerithium crossii (Deshayes, 1863); Cerithium dichroum Melvill & Standen, 1895; Cerithium dilectum (G.B. Sowerby II, 1855); Cerithium janthinum Gould, 1849; Cerithium paxillum Pease, 1861; Cerithium stigmosum Gould, 1861; Cerithium unilineatum Pease, 1861; Cerithium zebrum var. attenuata Vignal, 1903; Cerithium zebrum var. bilineata Vignal, 1903; Cerithium zebrum var. cinerea Vignal, 1903; Cerithium zebrum var. maculata Vignal, 1903; Cerithium zebrum var. multimaculata Vignal, 1903; Cerithium zebrum var. nivea Vignal, 1903; Cerithium zebrum var. ornata Vignal, 1903; Cerithium zebrum var. pulchra Vignal, 1903; Cerithium zebrum var. rosea Vignal, 1903; Cerithium zebrum var. sticta Vignal, 1903; Cerithium zebrum var. trifasciata Vignal, 1903; Cerithium zebrum var. trilineata Vignal, 1903; Cerithium zebrum var. undulata Dautzenberg & Bouge, 1833; Cerithium zebrum var. unimaculata Vignal, 1903

= Cerithium zebrum =

Species of gastropod

Cerithium zebrum is a species of sea snail, a marine gastropod mollusk in the family Cerithiidae. Cerithium zebrum is also commonly named zebra horn.

== Description ==
Cerithium zebrum has a distinctive growth to its shell where it starts as a solitary spiral cord that progressively strengthens over time giving its more pronounced spiral shell. There are numerous threads within its shell that differentiate in toughness since when they form a keel it tends to have more fragile ribs or axial riblets due to its one spiral strand. Its shell reaches about 7mm in length. Coming in many different colors from brown to beige, salmon, and even mauve. They also have a variable design that the shell has between being banded and unbanded.

== Distribution & Habitat ==
The distribution of Cerithium zebrum includes the Western Central Pacific. The primary habitat of Cerithium zebrum is found among the rocky shores of the rugged and ever-changing conditions of the intertidal zone or tidal pools. It's also said they can be found among the anchialine ponds which are in other words brackish water. (Brackish water is a mix between fresh and saltwater).

- Guam
- Hawaii
- American Samoa
- Northern Mariana Islands
- Indonesia
- Philippines
