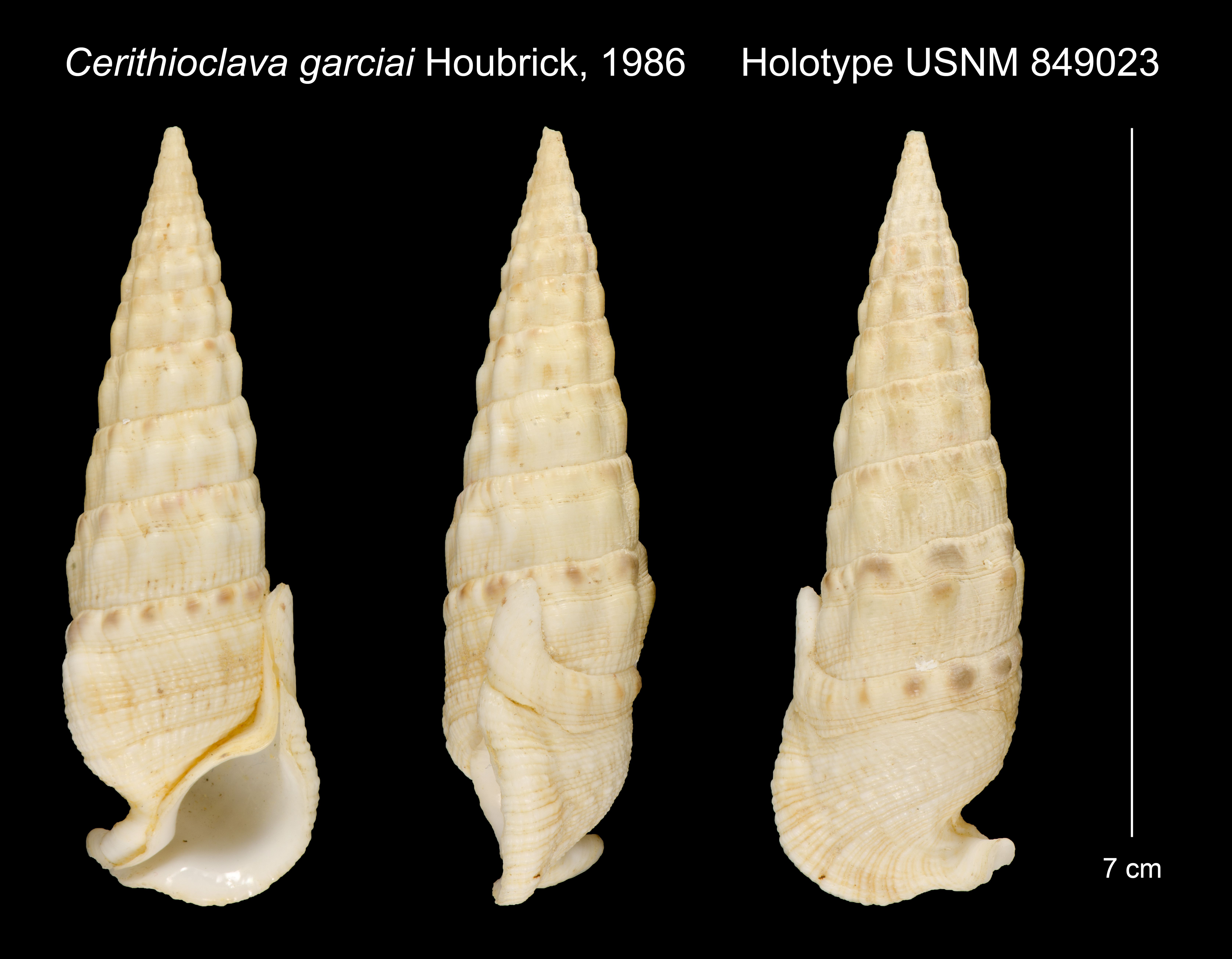

Scientific classification
- Kingdom: Animalia
- Phylum: Mollusca
- Class: Gastropoda
- Subclass: Caenogastropoda
- Order: incertae sedis
- Family: Cerithiidae
- Genus: Cerithioclava; Olsson & Harbison, 1953

= Cerithioclava =

Genus of gastropods

Cerithioclava is a genus of sea snails, marine gastropod mollusks in the family Cerithiidae.

== Species ==
Species within the genus Cerithioclava include:

- Cerithioclava garciai Houbrick, 1986
