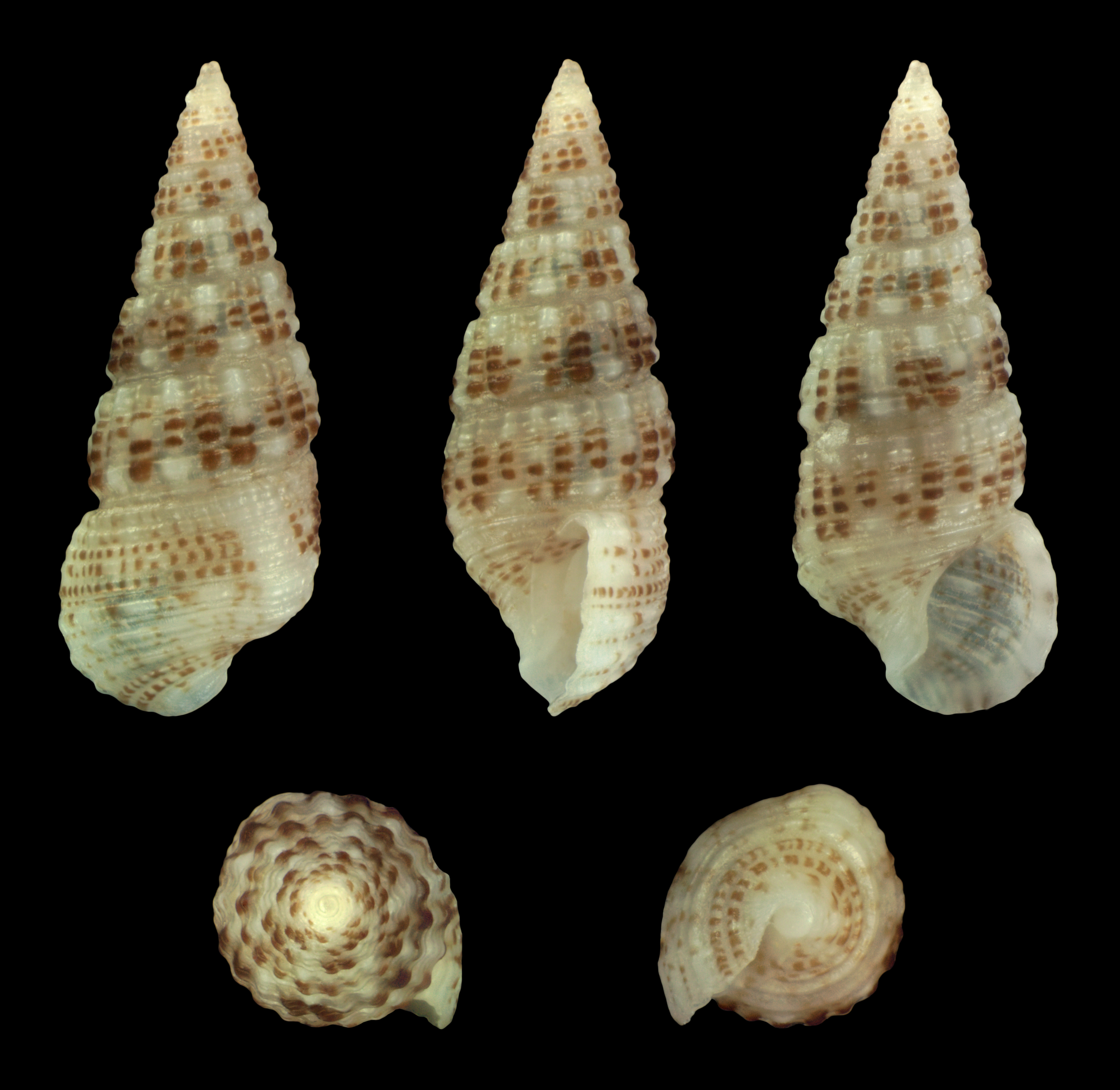

Scientific classification
- Kingdom: Animalia
- Phylum: Mollusca
- Class: Gastropoda
- Subclass: Caenogastropoda
- Order: incertae sedis
- Family: Cerithiidae
- Genus: Cerithium
- Species: C. alutaceum

Binomial name
- Cerithium alutaceum (Gould, 1861)

Synonyms
- Bittium alutaceum Gould, 1861 (original combination); Bittium numamuranum Yokoyama, 1925 †; Bittium perpusillum Tryon, 1887; Cerithiopsis hilaris Yokoyama, 1924 †; Cerithium lineatum Tryon, 1887 (invalid: junior homonym of Cerithium lineatum Lamarck, 1822); Cerithium sergentum Jousseaume, 1931; Cerithium stigmosum Gould, 1861

= Cerithium alutaceum =

Species of gastropod

Cerithium alutaceum is a species of sea snail, a marine gastropod mollusk in the family Cerithiidae.

== Distribution ==
This marine species occurs in the China Seas and in Queensland, Australia.
