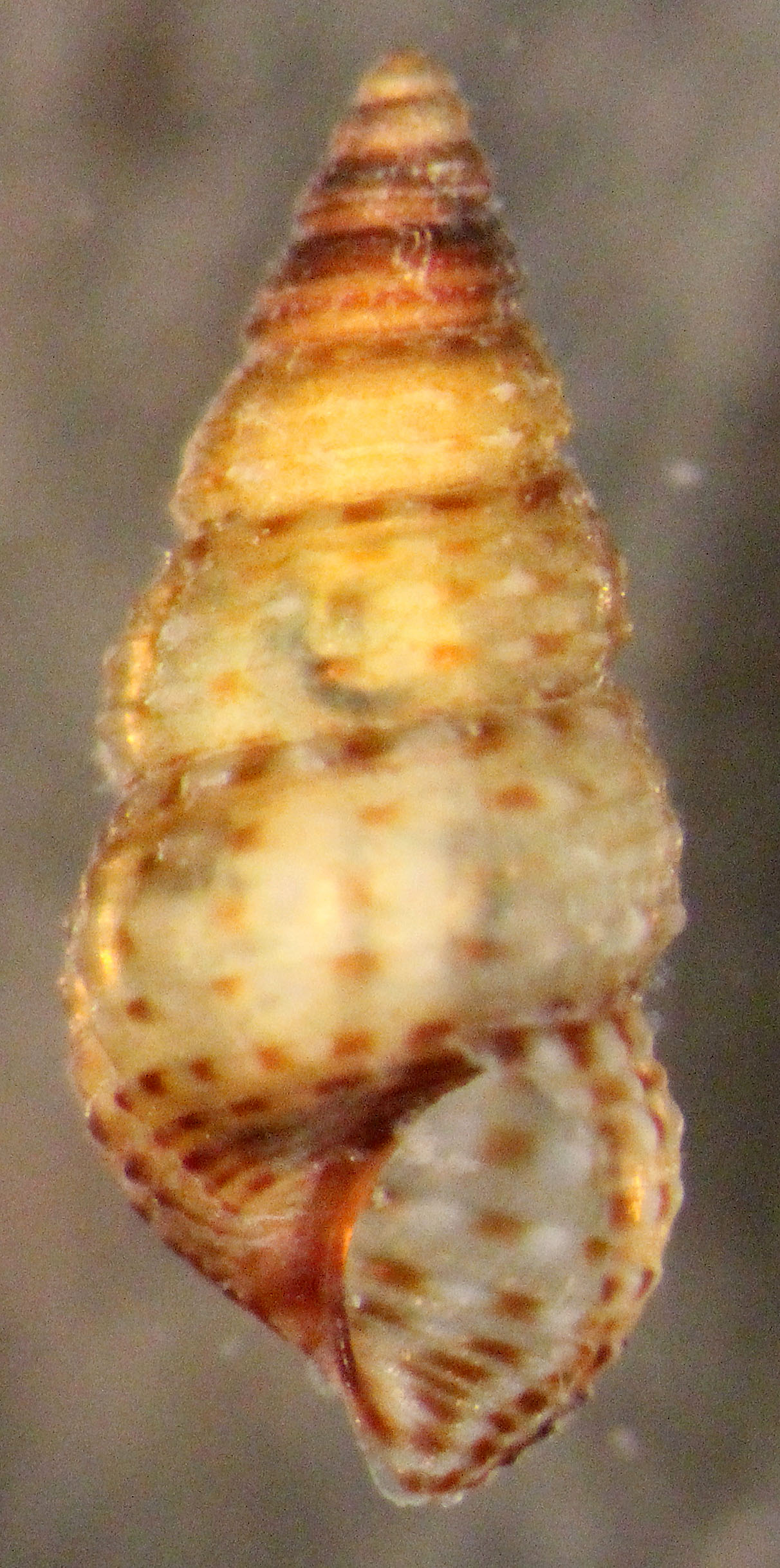
- Bittiolum varium

Scientific classification
- Kingdom: Animalia
- Phylum: Mollusca
- Class: Gastropoda
- Subclass: Caenogastropoda
- Order: incertae sedis
- Family: Cerithiidae
- Genus: Bittiolum; Cossmann, 1906

= Bittiolum =

Genus of gastropods

Bittiolum is a genus of sea snails, marine gastropod mollusks in the family Cerithiidae.

== Species ==
Species within the genus Bittiolum include:

- Bittiolum alternatum (Say, 1822)
- Bittiolum varium (Pfeiffer, 1840)
