= Cassiella =

Scientific classification
- Kingdom: Animalia
- Phylum: Mollusca
- Class: Gastropoda
- Subclass: Caenogastropoda
- Order: incertae sedis
- Family: Cerithiidae
- Genus: Cassiella; Gofas, 1987

Species
- See text

Genus of gastropods

Cassiella is a genus of sea snails, marine gastropod mollusks in the family Cerithiidae.

== Species ==
Species within the genus Cassiella include:

- Cassiella abylensis Gofas, 1987
