= Fastigiella =

Scientific classification
- Kingdom: Animalia
- Phylum: Mollusca
- Class: Gastropoda
- Subclass: Caenogastropoda
- Order: incertae sedis
- Family: Cerithiidae
- Genus: Fastigiella; Reeve, 1848

Genus of gastropods

Fastigiella is a genus of sea snails, marine gastropod mollusks in the family Cerithiidae.

== Species ==
Species within the genus Fastigiella include:

- Fastigiella carinata Reeve, 1848
- † Fastigiella gibbosula (Melleville, 1843)
- † Fastigiella rugosa (Lamarck, 1804)
