= Varicopeza =

Scientific classification
- Kingdom: Animalia
- Phylum: Mollusca
- Class: Gastropoda
- Subclass: Caenogastropoda
- Order: incertae sedis
- Family: Cerithiidae
- Genus: Varicopeza; Gründel, 1976

Genus of gastropods

Varicopeza is a genus of sea snails, marine gastropod mollusks in the family Cerithiidae.

== Species ==
Species within the genus Varicopeza include:

- Varicopeza crystallina (Dall, 1881)
- Varicopeza pauxilla (A. Adams, 1855)
