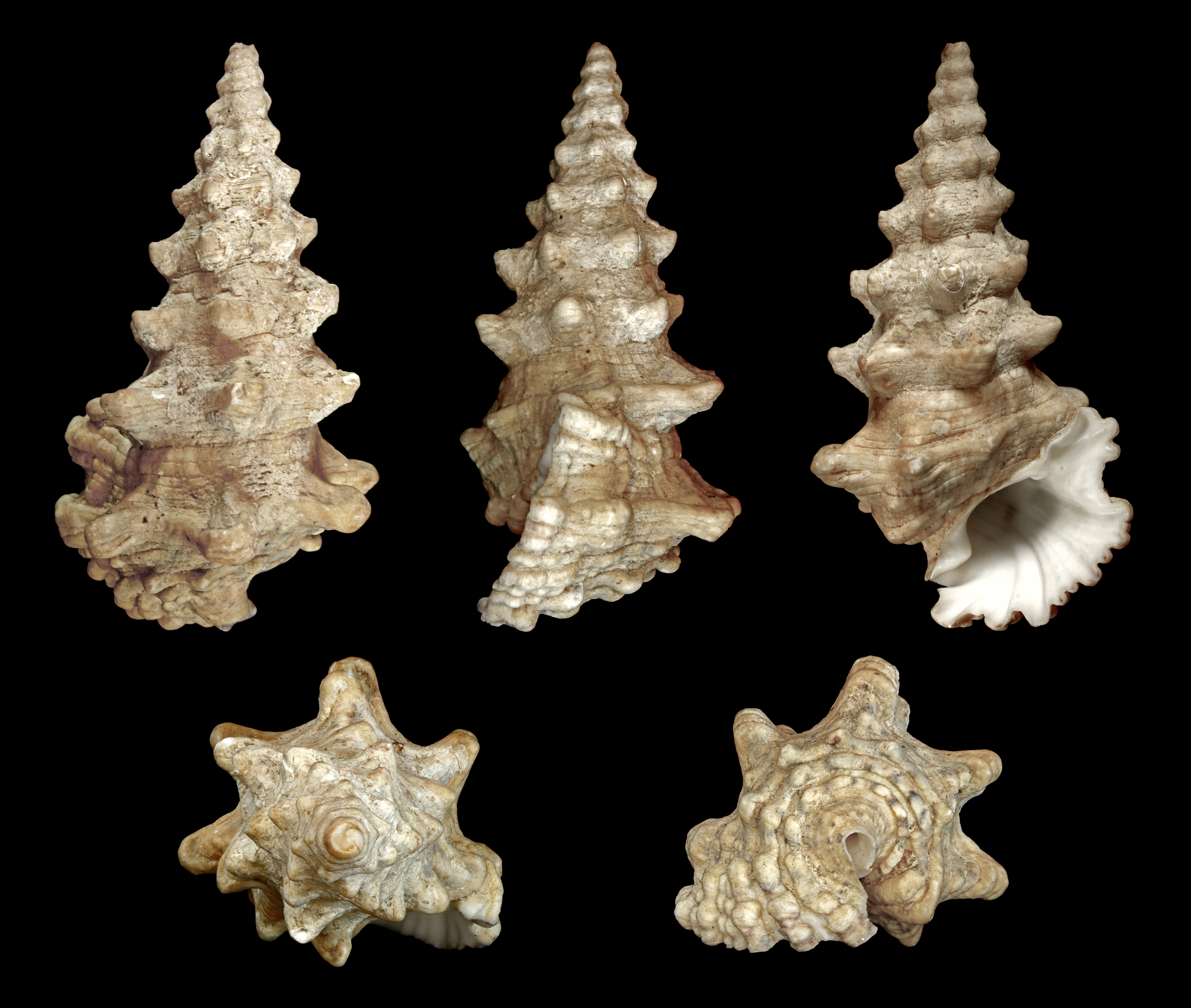
- Five views of a shell of Cerithium nodulosum

Scientific classification
- Kingdom: Animalia
- Phylum: Mollusca
- Class: Gastropoda
- Subclass: Caenogastropoda
- Order: incertae sedis
- Family: Cerithiidae
- Genus: Cerithium
- Species: C. nodulosum

Binomial name
- Cerithium nodulosum Bruguière, 1792

Synonyms
- Cerithium (Contumax) nodulosum Bruguière, 1792; Cerithium adansonii Bruguière, 1792; Cerithium curvirostra Perry, 1811; Cerithium erythraeonense Lamarck, 1822; Cerithium nodulosum erythraeonense Lamarck, 1822; Cerithium omissum Bayle, 1880; Cerithium tuberosum G.B. Sowerby II, 1855; Contumax decollata Hedley, 1899; Contumax nodulosus (Bruguière, 1792); Mathilda eurytima Melvill & Standen, 1896; Murex nodulosus Bruguière, 1792; Murex tuberosus Dillwyn, 1817

= Cerithium nodulosum =

Species of gastropod

Cerithium nodulosum is a species of sea snail, a marine gastropod mollusk in the family Cerithiidae.

== Distribution ==
The distribution of Cerithium nodulosum includes the Indo-Pacific and Red Sea.
