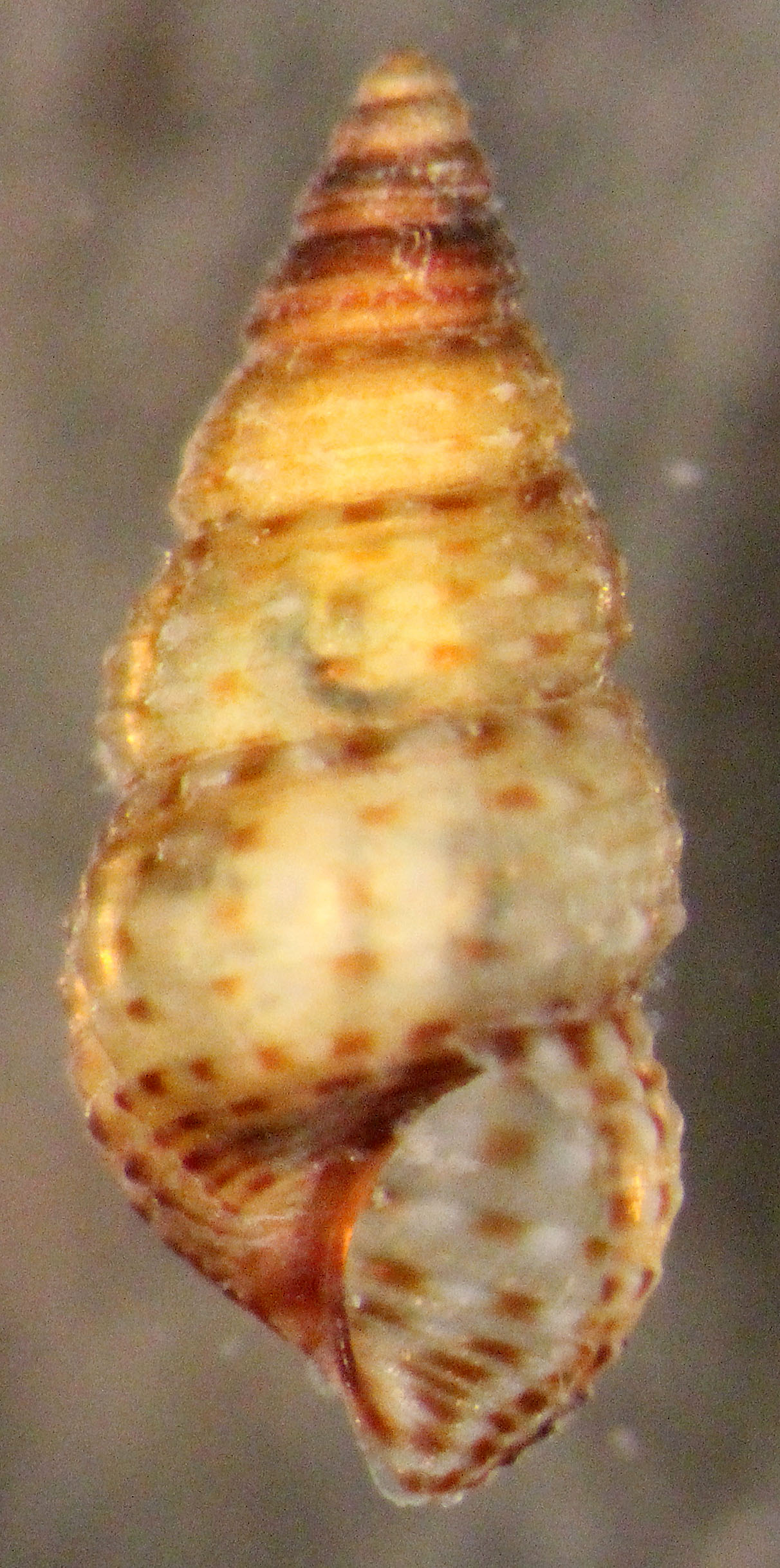

Scientific classification
- Kingdom: Animalia
- Phylum: Mollusca
- Class: Gastropoda
- Subclass: Caenogastropoda
- Order: incertae sedis
- Family: Cerithiidae
- Genus: Bittiolum
- Species: B. varium

Binomial name
- Bittiolum varium (Pfeiffer, 1840)

Synonyms
- Bittiolum properatum Woodring, 1928; Bittium varium (Pfeiffer, 1840); Cerithium columellare d'Orbigny, 1847; Cerithium gibberulum C.B. Adams, 1845; Cerithium pallidum Pfeiffer, 1840; Cerithium triseriale Gabb, 1881; Cerithium varium Pfeiffer, 1840; Diastoma varium (Pfeiffer, 1840)

= Bittiolum varium =

Species of gastropod

Bittiolum varium, common name the grass cerith, is a species of sea snail, a marine gastropod mollusk in the family Cerithiidae.

== Distribution ==
Bittiolum varium occurs in shallow waters (0–11 m (0–36 ft) depth) of the Western Atlantic between the East Coast of the United States (Maryland) and Brazil.

== Description ==
The maximum recorded shell length is 6.5 mm.

== Habitat ==
The minimum recorded depth for this species is 0 m; maximum recorded depth is 11 m.
