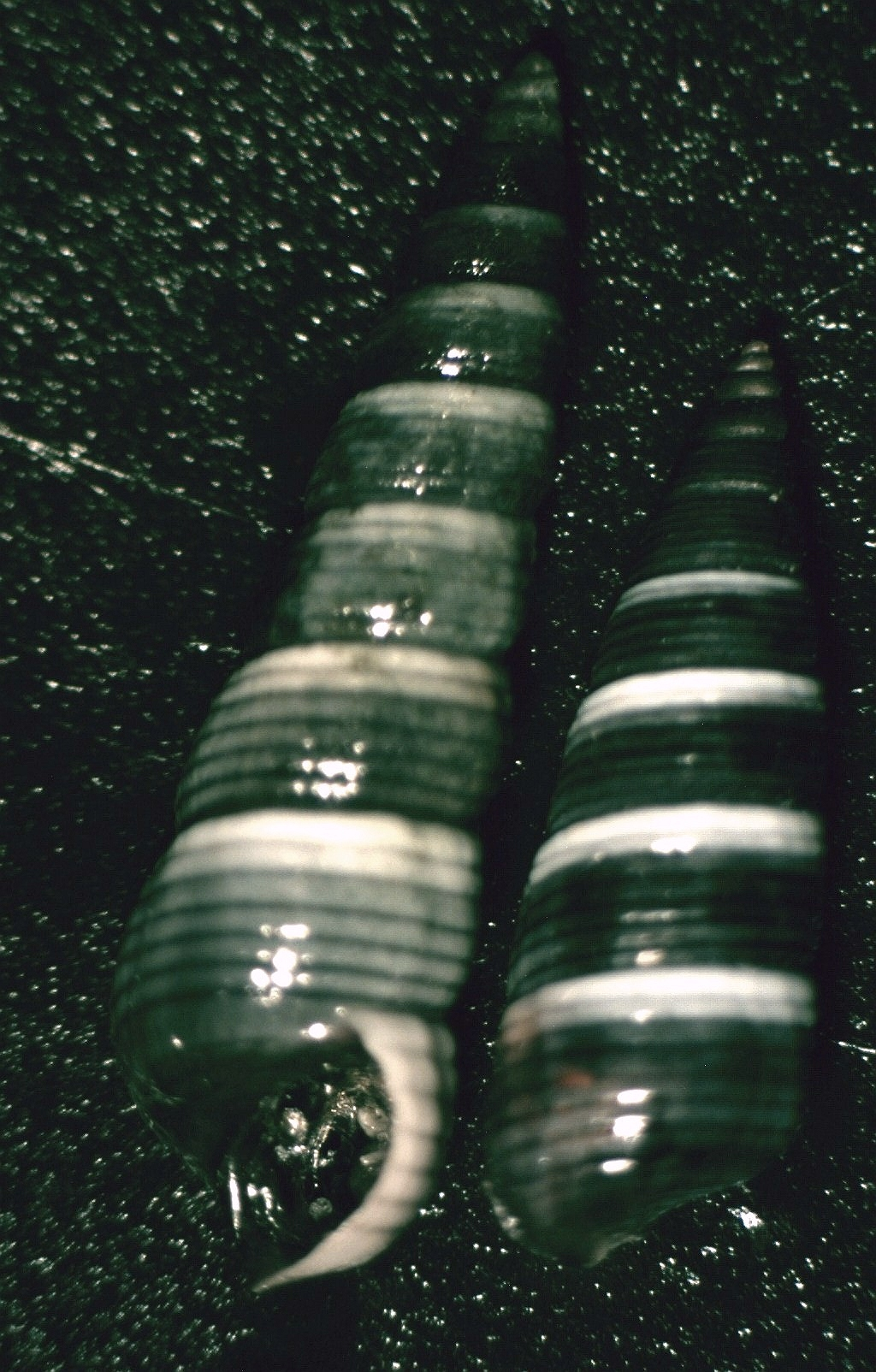
- Zeacumantus plumbeus

Scientific classification
- Kingdom: Animalia
- Phylum: Mollusca
- Class: Gastropoda
- Subclass: Caenogastropoda
- Order: incertae sedis
- Family: Batillariidae
- Genus: Zeacumantus
- Species: Z. plumbeus

Binomial name
- Zeacumantus plumbeus (G. B. Sowerby II, 1855)

Synonyms
- Batillaria estuarina (Tate, 1893); Batillariella estuarina (Tate, 1893); Bittium estuarinum Tate, 1893; Bittium lawleyanum Crosse, 1863; Cerithium insculptum G. B. Sowerby II, 1865; Cerithium plumbeum G. B. Sowerby II, 1855; Pirenella insculpta (G. B. Sowerby II, 1865); Zeacumantus estuarinus (Tate, 1893)

= Zeacumantus plumbeus =

Species of gastropod

Zeacumantus plumbeus is a species of sea snail, a marine gastropod mollusk in the family Batillariidae.
