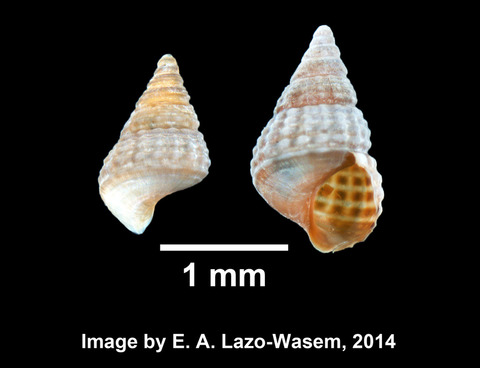

Scientific classification
- Kingdom: Animalia
- Phylum: Mollusca
- Class: Gastropoda
- Subclass: Caenogastropoda
- Order: incertae sedis
- Family: Cerithiidae
- Genus: Bittiolum
- Species: B. alternatum

Binomial name
- Bittiolum alternatum (Say, 1822)

Synonyms
- Bittium alternatum (Say, 1822); Bittium nigrum (Totten, 1834); Cerithium reticulatum Totten, 1835; Cerithium sayi Gould, 1841; Diastoma alternatum (Say, 1822); Diastoma virginica Henderson & Bartsch, 1914; Pasithea nigra Totten, 1834; Turritella alternata Say, 1822

= Bittiolum alternatum =

Species of gastropod

Bittiolum alternatum is a species of sea snail, a marine gastropod mollusk in the family Cerithiidae.

== Description ==
The maximum recorded shell length is 8.3 mm.

== Habitat ==
The minimum recorded depth for this species is 0 m, maximum recorded depth is 37 m.
