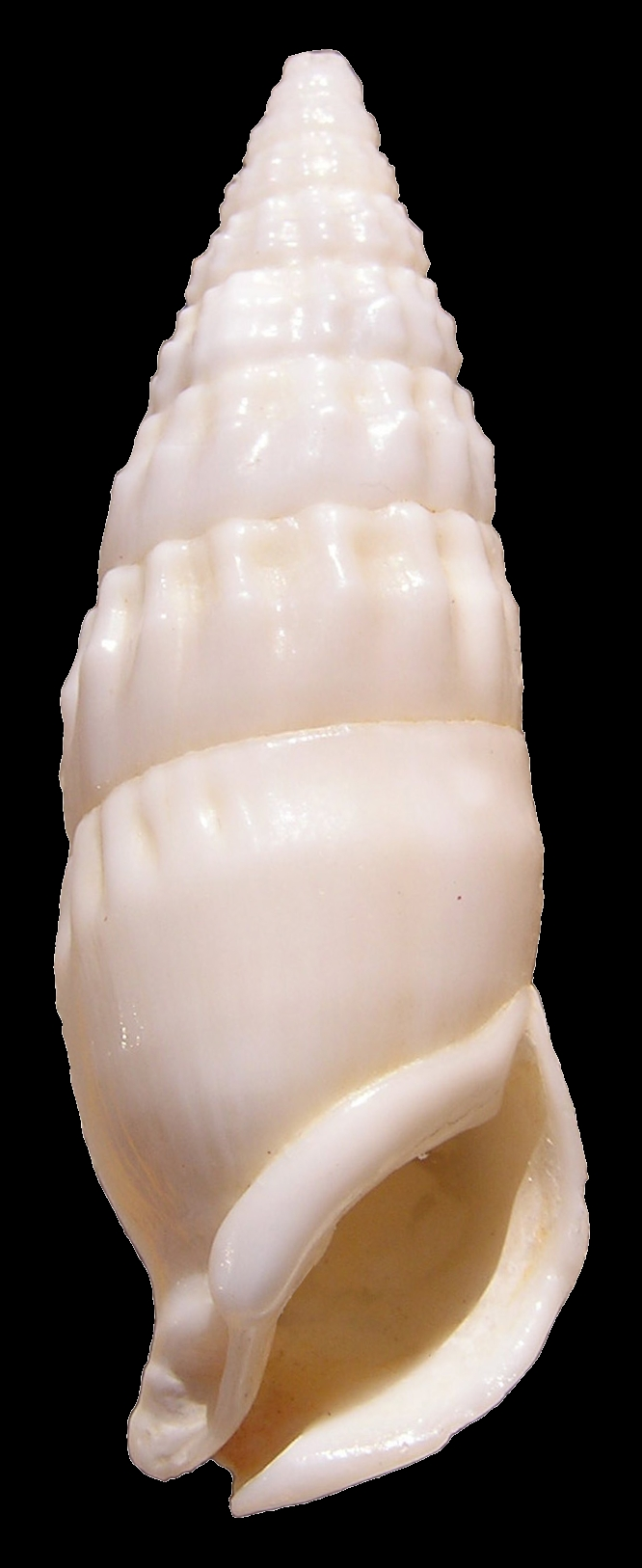
- Apertural view of a shell of Rhinoclavis vertagus.

Scientific classification
- Kingdom: Animalia
- Phylum: Mollusca
- Class: Gastropoda
- Subclass: Caenogastropoda
- Order: incertae sedis
- Superfamily: Cerithioidea
- Family: Cerithiidae; Fleming, 1822

Diversity
- 71 extant species of Bittiinae; 114 extant species of Cerithiinae

= Cerithiidae =

Family of molluscs

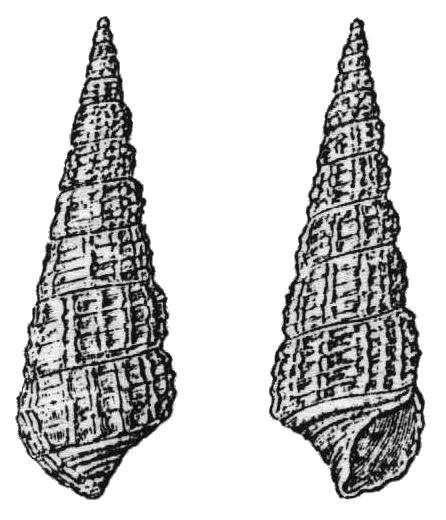
Fossil Bittium reticulatum.

50 second video of snails (most likely Natica chemnitzi and Cerithium muscarum) feeding on the sea floor in the Gulf of California, Puerto Peñasco, Mexico

Cerithiidae, common name the cerithiids or ceriths, is a large family of medium-sized marine gastropods in the clade Sorbeoconcha.

== Distribution ==
Ceriths are found worldwide on sandy bottoms, reef flats or coral reef rock covered with sand and algae in the sublittoral zone of warm or temperate waters. Most are found in tropical areas. A few occur along the European coastline and about 30 species in two genera are found along the American coast. A few species occur in estuarine areas of mangrove forests close to the sea. Only a few species of the subfamily Bittiinae are found in deep water.

== Diet ==
Ceriths are herbivores and detritivores that graze the sea bed.

== Description ==
Their slender shell is elongated with a pointed spire. They vary in size from 3 mm (Bittium alternatum) to 150 mm (Cerithium nodulosum). The smallest shells are found in the subfamily Bittiinae.

The many whorls have radial sculpture with axial ridges and nodules. The aperture shows at its base a vague curve or a distinct siphonal canal. The aperture is closed off by a thin oval brown operculum that is corneous and paucispiral. The palatal wall of the aperture is somewhat enlarged and often shows a varix.

The taenioglossan radula has seven teeth in each row. The single rachidian tooth is flanked on each side by one rhomboidal lateral tooth and two long, hook-like marginal teeth.

== Taxonomy ==
=== Subfamilies ===
The following three subfamilies have been recognized in the taxonomy of Bouchet & Rocroi (2005):

- Alabininae Dall, 1927
- Bittiinae Cossmann, 1906
- Cerithiinae Fleming, 1822 - synonyms: Rhinoclavinae Gründel, 1982; Colininae Golikov & Starobogatov, 1987

Bandel (2006) used different classification: Bittiinae on its own family level named Diastomatidae (overview of WoRMS).

Some authors classify Argyropezinae Bandel, 2006 as a synonym of Bittiinae.

=== Genera ===
The following genera are recognised in the family Cerithiidae:

- Alabina Dall, 1902 - type genus of the subfamily Alabininae, the type species of the genus Alabina is extinct
- Argyropeza Melvill & Standen, 1901
- †Bezanconia P. Fischer, 1884
- Bittiolum Cossmann, 1906
- Bittium J. E. Gray, 1847 - type genus of the subfamily Bittiinae,
- †Bogatschevia A. A. Ali-Zade & Kabakova, 1969
- Cacozeliana Strand, 1928
- Cassiella Gofas, 1987
- †Cerithidella Stache, 1889
- Cerithidium Monterosato, 1884
- Cerithioclava Olsson & Harbison, 1953
- Cerithium Bruguière, 1789 - type genus of the subfamily Cerithiinae,
- †Chavanicerithium Ludbrook, 1957
- Clavocerithium Cossmann, 1920
- Clypeomorus Jousseaume, 1888
- Colina H. Adams & A. Adams, 1854
- †Conocerithium Sacco, 1895
- Dahlakia H. E. J. Biggs, 1971
- Fastigiella Reeve, 1848
- †Globulocerithium Pacaud, 2023
- Glyptozaria Iredale, 1924
- Gourmya P. Fischer, 1884
- Ittibittium Houbrick, 1993
- †Jetwoodsia Ludbrook, 1971
- Limatium E. E. Strong & Bouchet, 2018
- Liocerithium Tryon, 1887
- Lirobittium Bartsch, 1911
- †Manulona Ludbrook, 1941
- †Megistocerithium Kase, 2015
- †Mesostomella Stache, 1889
- Neostylidium Doweld, 2013
- †Occidentocerithium Nützel, Blodgett & Stanley, 2003
- †Orthochetus Cossmann, 1889
- †Peraubium Dominici & Kowalke, 2014
- Pictorium E. E. Strong & Bouchet, 2013
- †Pseudoaluco B. L. Clark, 1946
- Pseudovertagus Vignal, 1904
- †Ptychocerithium Sacco, 1895
- Rhinoclavis Swainson, 1840
- Royella Iredale, 1912
- †Semibittium Cossmann, 1896
- †Taxonia H. J. Finlay, 1926
- †Texmelanatria K. van W. Palmer, 1942
- Varicopeza Gründel, 1976
- Zebittium H. J. Finlay, 1926
- †Zefallacia H. J. Finlay, 1926
