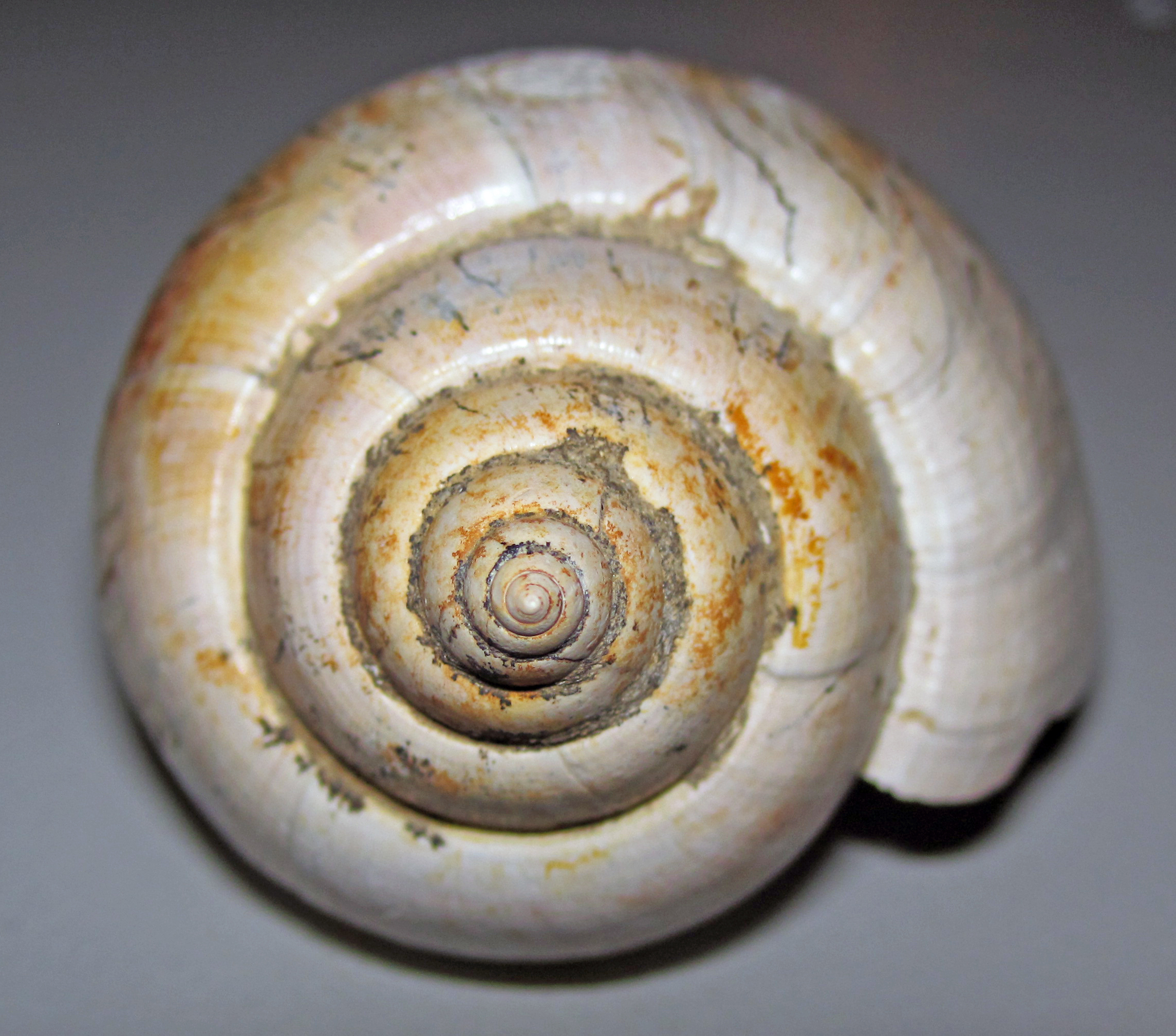
- Fossilized shell of Crommium angustatum

Scientific classification
- Kingdom: Animalia
- Phylum: Mollusca
- Class: Gastropoda
- Subclass: Caenogastropoda
- Order: incertae sedis
- Superfamily: Campaniloidea
- Family: Ampullinidae
- Genus: †Crommium
- Species: †C. angustatum

Binomial name
- †Crommium angustatum Grateloup, 1828

Synonyms
- Ampullaria angustata Grateloup, 1828 † (original combination); Ampullaria ferruginea Grateloup, 1828 †; Ampullaria striatula Deshayes, 1830 †; Natica delbosii Hébert, 1849 †; Natica subturrita Schauroth, 1865 †

= Crommium angustatum =

Species of snail

Crommium angustatum was a species of sea snail in the family Ampullinidae. Now extinct, it is known only from fossils. It came from the Oligocene epoch. It was originally mistakenly identified as a freshwater snail in the Ampullariidae family. It has been found in France.
