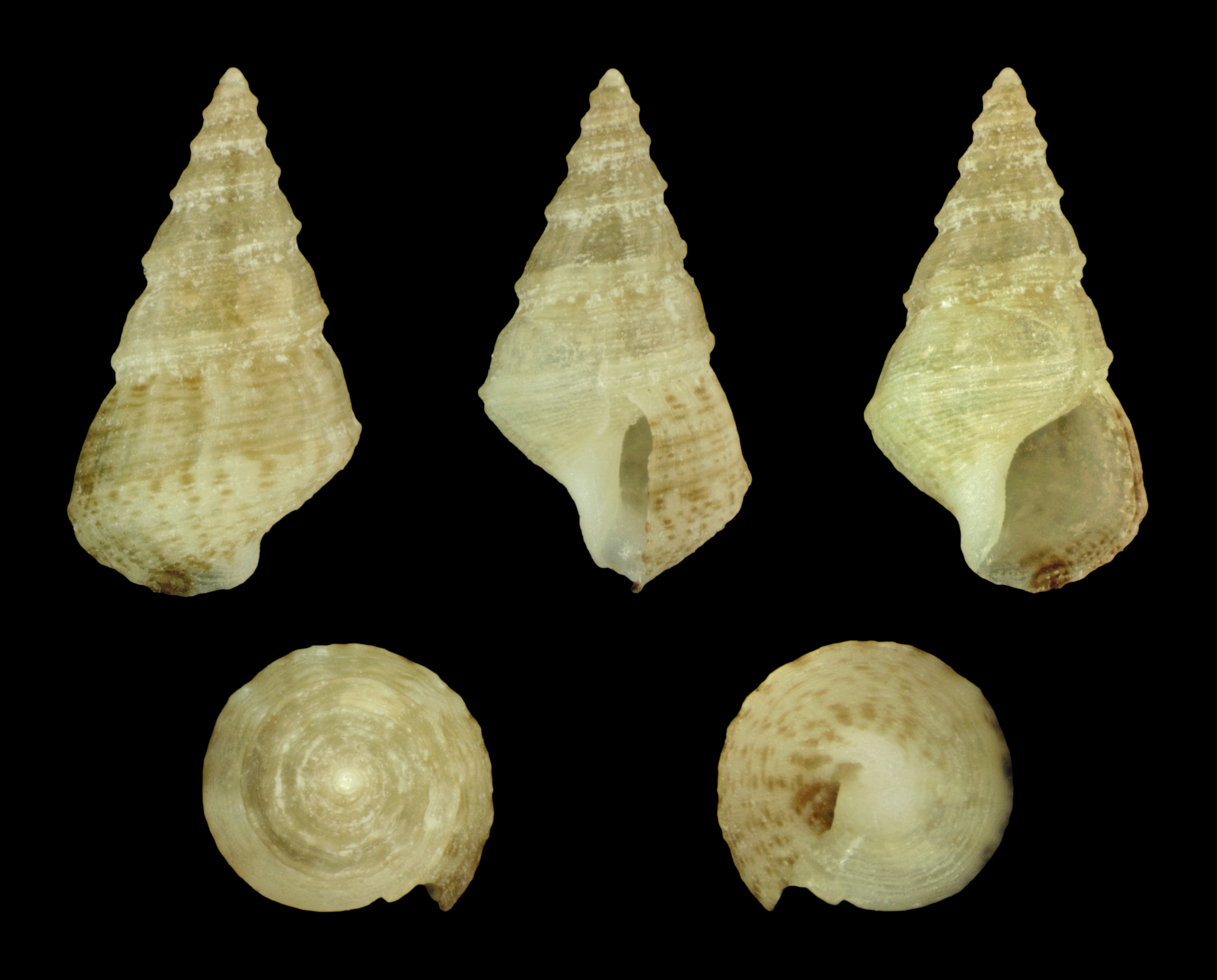
- A shell of Plesiotrochus souverbianus

Scientific classification
- Kingdom: Animalia
- Phylum: Mollusca
- Class: Gastropoda
- Subclass: Caenogastropoda
- Order: incertae sedis
- Family: Plesiotrochidae
- Genus: Plesiotrochus
- Species: P. souverbianus

Binomial name
- Plesiotrochus souverbianus Fischer, 1878

Synonyms
- Plesiotrochus exilis Pease, W.H., 1867; Plesiotrochus unicinctus Adams, A., 1853; Risella (Plesiotrochus) souverbianus Fischer, 1878

= Plesiotrochus souverbianus =

Species of gastropod

Plesiotrochus souverbianus is a species of sea snail, a marine gastropod mollusc in the family Plesiotrochidae.

According to Strong & Bouchet (2008) is Plesiotrochus souverbianus a synonym of Plesiotrochus unicinctus.

== Description ==
The height of the shell varies between 3 mm and 14 mm. The perforate shell is spirally striate, rather indistinctly longitudinally ribbed. The ribs are low and wide, rounded, and undulate the peripheral carina. The aperture is produced below into a short, narrow canal. The color of the shell is yellowish white, with thread-like spiral purplish lines interrupted by the ribs and generally arranged in pairs. There is a purple articulated line at the suture and the periphery, another one on the base.

== Distribution ==
This marine species occurs in the Red Sea; and off the Philippines, Hawaii, Japan
