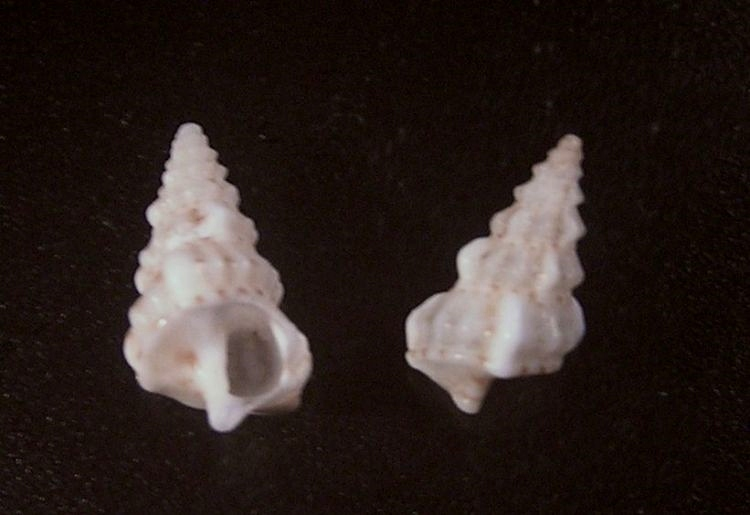
- Plesiotrochus monachus

Scientific classification
- Kingdom: Animalia
- Phylum: Mollusca
- Class: Gastropoda
- Subclass: Caenogastropoda
- Order: incertae sedis
- Family: Plesiotrochidae
- Genus: Plesiotrochus; Fischer, 1878

Type species
- Plesiotrochus souverbianus Fischer, 1878

Synonyms
- Hemicerithium Cossmann, 1893; Hypotrochus Cotton, 1932

= Plesiotrochus =

Genus of gastropods

Plesiotrochus is a genus of sea snails, marine gastropod molluscs in the family Plesiotrochidae.

Plesiotrochus was originally placed in the superfamily Cerithioidea but was subsequently transferred to the superfamily Campaniloidea by Healy (1993).

== Description ==
The shell have an elongate, conical shape. Their length of rather small (between 5 mm and 10 mm, with one species up to 24 mm). The imperforate whorls are flat to concave. The subrhomboidal aperture is smooth within and prolonged by a short siphonal canal. The outer lip is subrostrate in the middle. The columella and the siphonal canal are twisted. The sculpture shows conspicuous ribs with varices or just spirals. The operculum is eccentric.

== Distribution ==
The species occur in the Indo-Pacific.

== Species ==
Species within the genus Plesiotrochus include:

- Plesiotrochus acutangulus (Yokoyama, 1924)
- Plesiotrochus calliostomoides (Thiele, 1929)
- Plesiotrochus crinitus Thiele, 1930
- † Plesiotrochus fallax Grateloup 1832
- Plesiotrochus fischeri E. A. Smith, 1909
- Plesiotrochus luteus (Gould, 1861)
- Plesiotrochus monachus (Crosse & Fischer, 1864)
- Plesiotrochus pagodiformis Hedley, 1907
- Plesiotrochus paucicostatus Kilburn, 1975
- Plesiotrochus penetricinctus (Cotton, 1932)
- Plesiotrochus souverbianus Fischer, 1878
- † Plesiotrochus stephanense Cossmann and Peyrot 1922

Species brought into synonymy

- Plesiotrochus exilis Pease, W.H., 1867: synonym of Plesiotrochus souverbianus Fischer, 1878
- Plesiotrochus nipponkaiensis Habe & Masuda, 1990: synonym of Ittibittium nipponkaiense (Habe & Masuda, 1990)
- Plesiotrochus penitricinctus [sic] : synonym of Plesiotrochus penetricinctus (Cotton, 1932)
- Plesiotrochus unicinctus Adams, A., 1853: synonym of Plesiotrochus souverbianus Fischer, 1878
