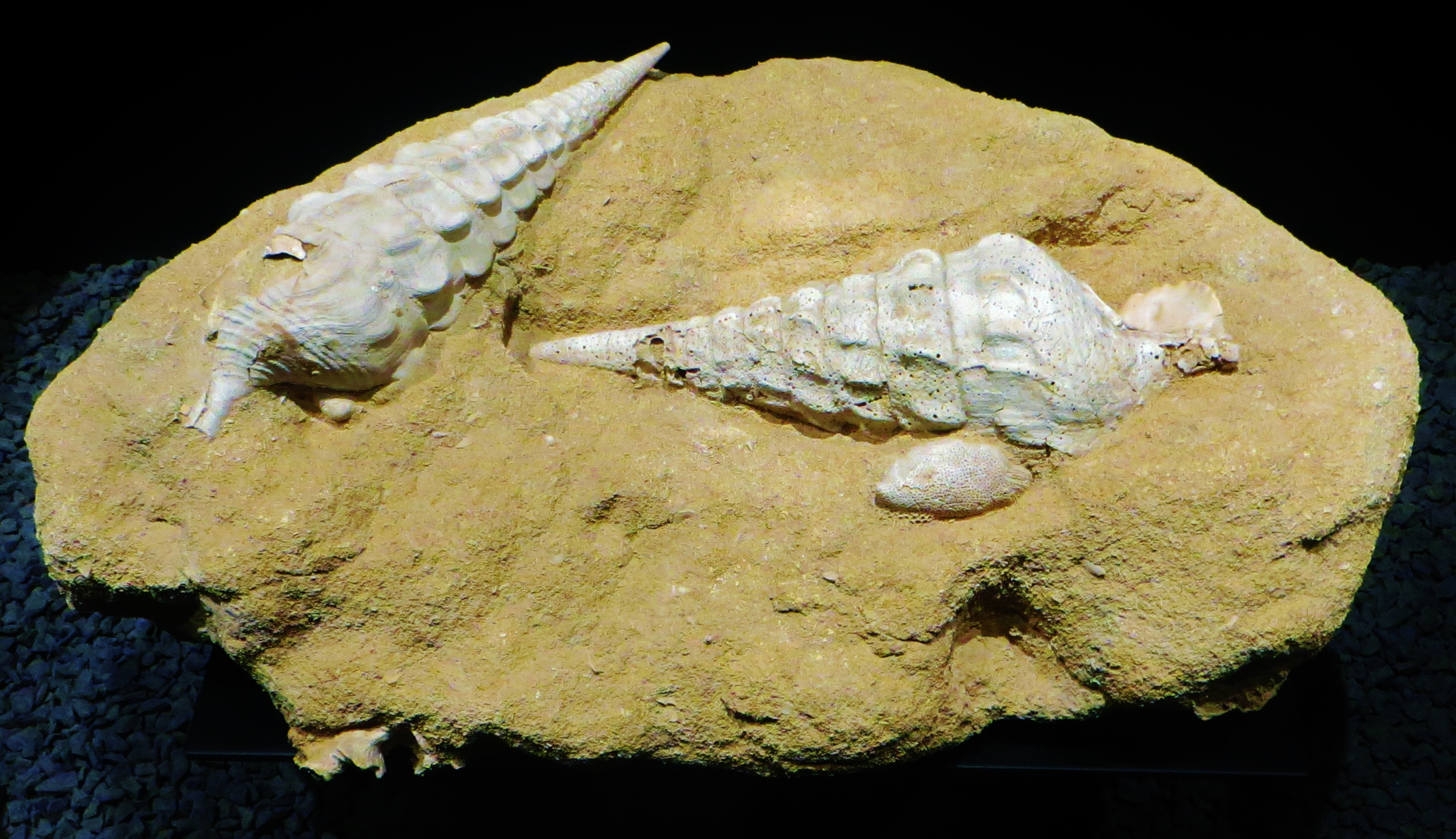
- Fossil shell of Campanile cornucopiae from France

Scientific classification
- Kingdom: Animalia
- Phylum: Mollusca
- Class: Gastropoda
- Subclass: Caenogastropoda
- Family: Campanilidae
- Genus: Campanile
- Species: C. cornucopiae

Binomial name
- Campanile cornucopiae Sowerby, 1818

= Campanile cornucopiae =

Campanile cornucopiae Temporal range: Eocene

Species of gastropod

Campanile cornucopiae is a species of fossil sea snail, a marine gastropod mollusc in the family Campanilidae. This species lived during the Eocene epoch, from 56 to 33.9 million years ago.

The shells reached a length of about 50 millimetres (2.0 in).
