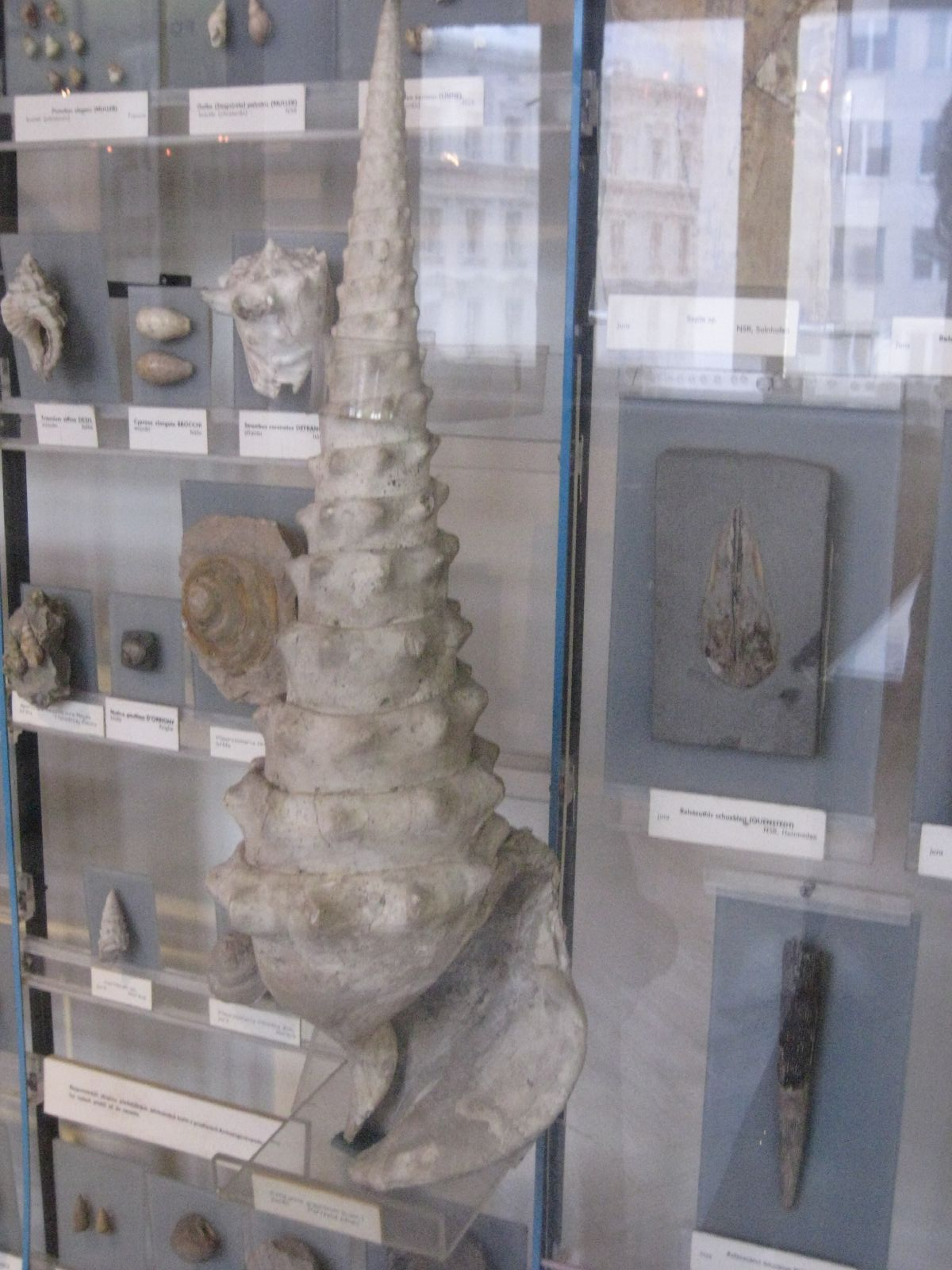
- Fossil shell of Campanile giganteum

Scientific classification
- Kingdom: Animalia
- Phylum: Mollusca
- Class: Gastropoda
- Subclass: Caenogastropoda
- Order: incertae sedis
- Superfamily: Campaniloidea; Douvillé, 1904

Families
- Ampullinidae Cossmann, 1919; Campanilidae Douvillé, 1904; Diozoptyxidae Pchelintsev, 1960 †; Gyrodidae Wenz, 1938 †; Metacerithiidae Cossmann, 1906 †; Plesiotrochidae Houbrick, 1990; Settsassiidae Bandel, 1992 †; Trypanaxidae Gougerot & Le Renard, 1987 †; Tylostomatidae Stoliczka, 1868 †; Vernediidae Kollmann, 2005 †

= Campaniloidea =

Superfamily of gastropods

The Campaniloidea is a superfamily of sea snails, marine gastropod molluscs. The Campaniloidea are unassigned to an order in the clade Caenogastropoda.

== Taxonomy ==
The following four families have been recognized in the taxonomy of Bouchet & Rocroi (2005):

- Family Campanilidae Douvillé, H., 1904
- Family Ampullinidae A. E. M. Cossmann, 1919
- Family Plesiotrochidae Houbrick, 1990
- † Family Trypanaxidae Gougerot & Le Renard, 1987

(Families that are exclusively fossil are indicated with a dagger †)

Families brought into synonymy

- Ampullospiridae Cox, 1930 †: synonym of Ampullinidae Cossmann, 1919
- Diozoptyxidae Pchelintsev, 1960 †: synonym of Campanilidae Douvillé, 1904
- Globulariidae Wenz, 1941: synonym of Ampullinidae Cossmann, 1919
- Gymnocerithiidae Golikov & Starobogatov, 1987 †: synonym of Campanilidae Douvillé, 1904
- Gyrodidae Wenz, 1938 †: synonym of Ampullinidae Cossmann, 1919
- Pseudamauridae Kowalke & Bandel, 1996 †: synonym of Ampullinidae Cossmann, 1919
