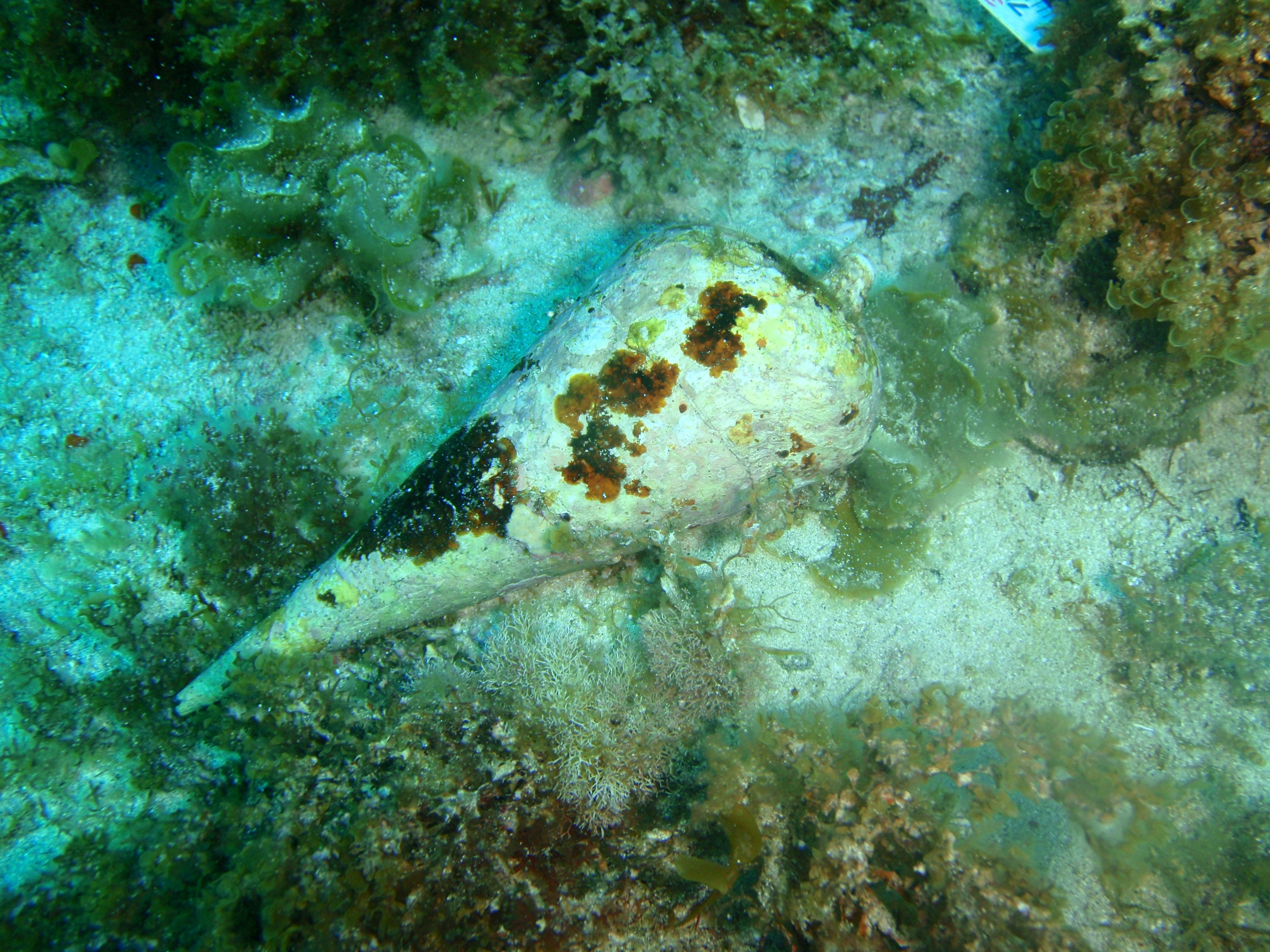

Scientific classification
- Kingdom: Animalia
- Phylum: Mollusca
- Class: Gastropoda
- Subclass: Caenogastropoda
- Order: incertae sedis
- Family: Campanilidae
- Genus: Campanile
- Species: C. symbolicum

Binomial name
- Campanile symbolicum Iredale, 1917

= Campanile symbolicum =

Species of gastropod

Campanile symbolicum, common name the bell clapper or the giant creeper, is a species of large sea snail, a marine gastropod mollusc in the family Campanilidae.

This is the only surviving species in the family Campanilidae and is a living fossil.

== Description ==
The length of the large, elongate, conical shell varies between 60 mm and 244 mm. There is a thick, chalky periostracum on the shell. The axis of the triangular-fusiform aperture makes a 45° angle with the shell. The shell has a sinuous outer lip and a central siphonal canal. The brown-colored, paucispiral operculum has a subcentral nucleus. The diameter of the operculum is somewhat smaller than the diameter of the aperture, allowing the animal to retract further inwards. The short, concave columella is twisted slightly to the left at the anterior canal. Its taenioglossate radula and thick jaws are characteristic of a herbivore.

== Distribution ==
This marine species is found off southwest Australia in shallow, sandy habitats in the subtidal zone.
