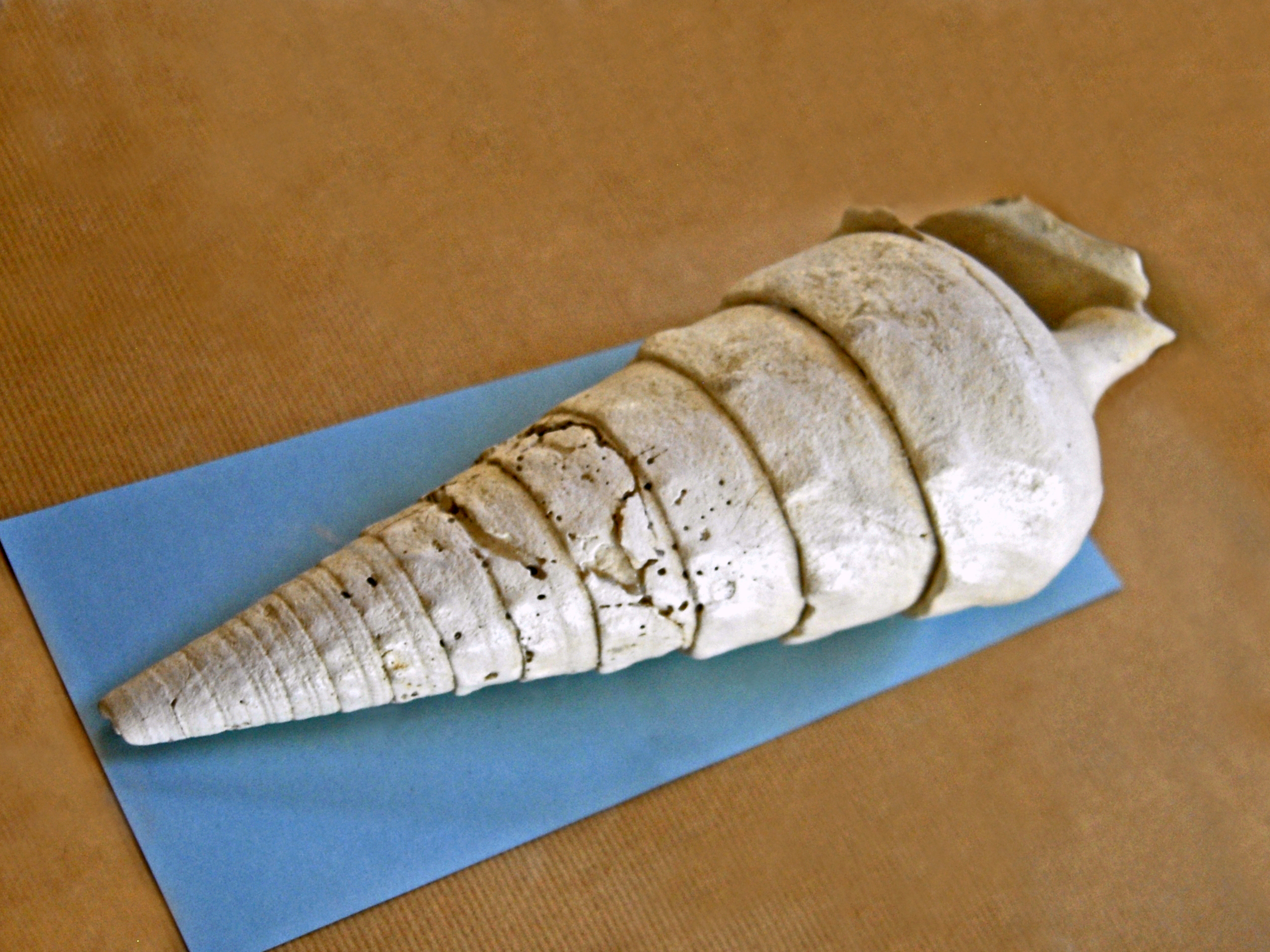
- Fossil shell of Campanile auvertianum from France, on display at Galerie de paléontologie et d'anatomie comparée in Paris

Scientific classification
- Kingdom: Animalia
- Phylum: Mollusca
- Class: Gastropoda
- Subclass: Caenogastropoda
- Order: incertae sedis
- Family: Campanilidae
- Genus: Campanile
- Species: C. auvertianum

Binomial name
- Campanile auvertianum (d'Orbigny, 1850)

Synonyms
- Cerithium auversiense

= Campanile auvertianum =

Campanile auvertianum Temporal range: Eocene

Species of gastropod

Campanile auvertianum is a species of fossil sea snail, a marine gastropod mollusc in the family Campanilidae.

This species lived during the Eocene epoch, Bartonian age (from 38.0 to 41.3 Ma).

Shells of Campanile auvertianum can reach a length of about 19–32 centimetres (7.5–12.6 in).
