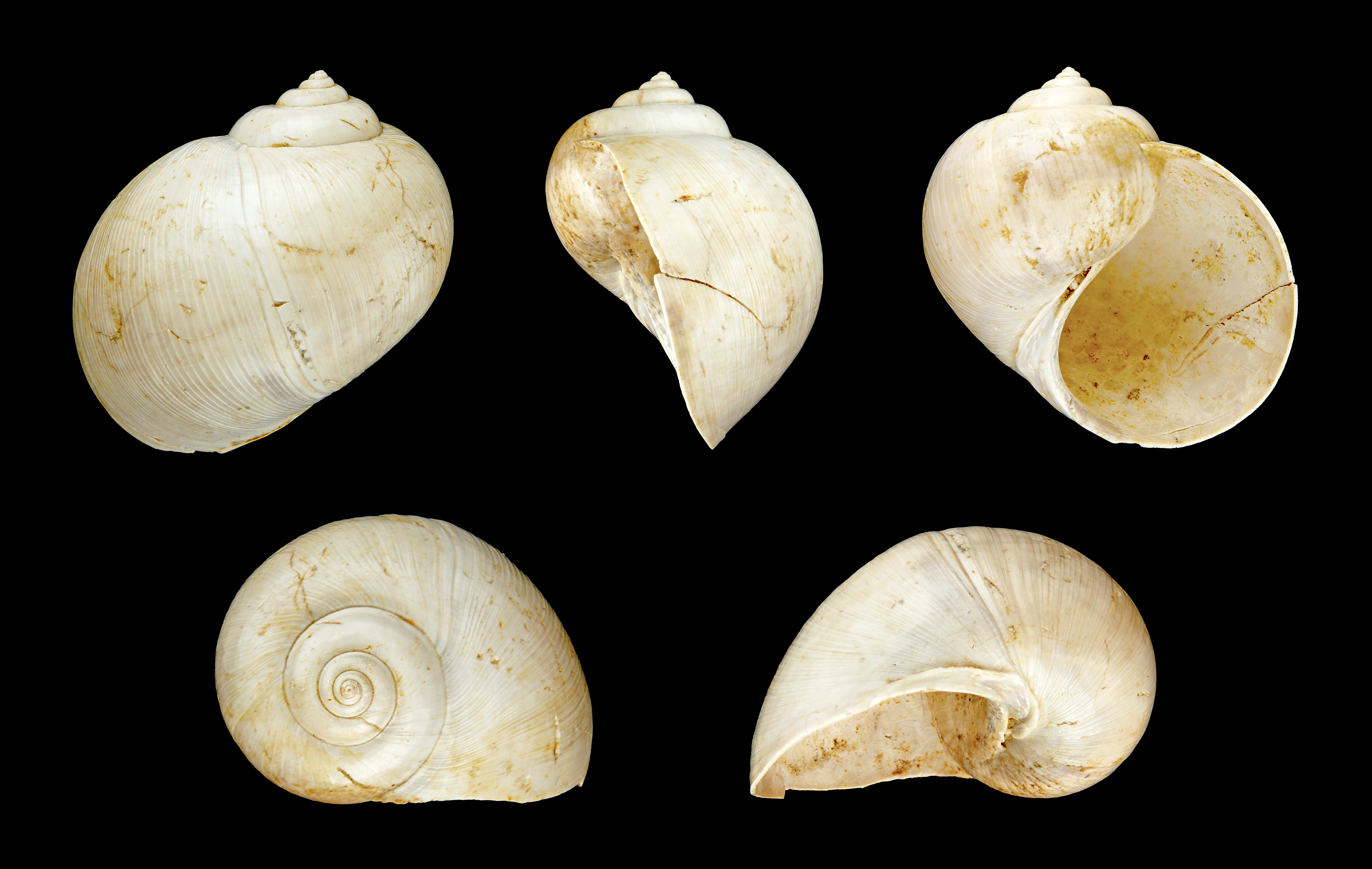
- Fossil shell of Globularia sigaretina

Scientific classification
- Kingdom: Animalia
- Phylum: Mollusca
- Class: Gastropoda
- Subclass: Caenogastropoda
- Order: incertae sedis
- Family: Ampullinidae
- Genus: †Globularia; Swainson 1840

= Globularia (gastropod) =

Extinct genus of gastropods

Globularia is an extinct genus of sea snails, marine gastropod molluscs in the family Ampullinidae.

== Species ==
Species within the genus Globularia include:

- †Globularia brevispira Cox 1930
- †Globularia carlei Finlay 1927
- †Globularia catanlilensis Weaver 1931
- †Globularia compressa Basterot 1825
- †Globularia coxi Stefanini 1939
- †Globularia fischeri Dall 1892
- †Globularia formosa Morris and Lycett 1851
- †Globularia gibberosa Grateloup 1847
- †Globularia grossa Deshayes 1864
- †Globularia hatimi Abbass 1972
- †Globularia hemisphaerica Roemer 1836
- †Globularia morrisi Cox and Arkell 1949
- †Globularia sanctistephani Cossmann and Peyrot 1919
- †Globularia sireli Okan and Hosgor 2008
- †Globularia sulcata Cox 1930
- †Globularia vapincana d'Orbigny 1850
- †Globularia vredenburgi Cox 1927
- †Globularia zemmourensis Cox 1969

not accepted names

- †Globularia fluctuata (Sowerby I, 1825), accepted as Cernina fluctuata (Sowerby I, 1825)

Fossils of the sea snails within this genus have been found all over the world in sediments from Jurassic to Miocene (age range: 189.6 to 5.332 million years ago).
