= C. giganteum =

C. giganteum may refer to:

- Campanile giganteum, a species of exceptionally large fossil sea snail
- Cardiocrinum giganteum, the giant Himalayan lily, the largest species of any of the lily plants found in the Himalayan

== See also ==
- Giganteum
