= Trypanaxidae =

Scientific classification
- Kingdom: Animalia
- Phylum: Mollusca
- Class: Gastropoda
- Subclass: Caenogastropoda
- Order: incertae sedis
- Superfamily: Campaniloidea
- Family: †Trypanaxidae; Gougerot & Le Renard, 1987

Extinct family of gastropods

Trypanaxidae is an extinct family of fossil sea snails, marine gastropod molluscs in the superfamily Campaniloidea.

According to the taxonomy of the Gastropoda by Bouchet & Rocroi (2005), the family Trypanaxidae has no subfamilies.

== Genera ==
Genera within the family Trypanaxidae include:

- † Trypanaxis Cossmann, 1889 - the type genus
- † Alocaxis Cossmann, 1889
