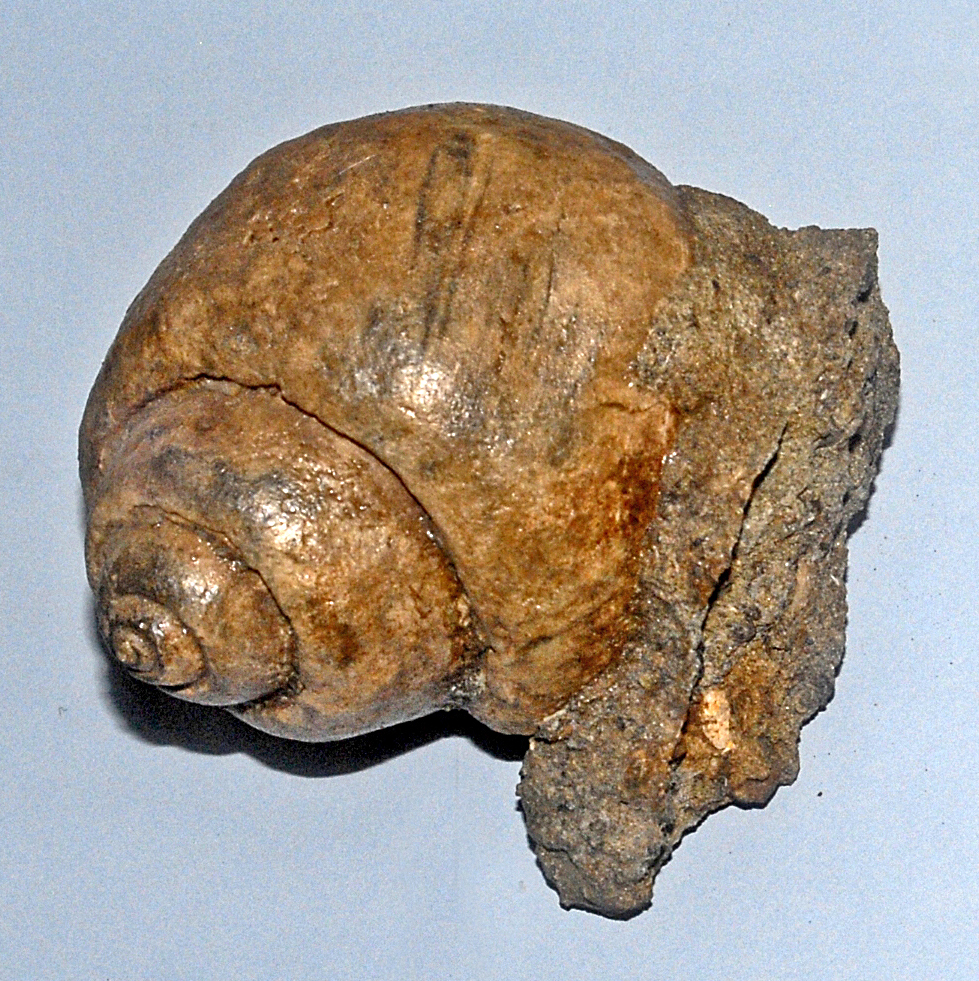
- Shell of Ampullinopsis crassatina from Lower Oligocene, Savona (Italy)

Scientific classification
- Kingdom: Animalia
- Phylum: Mollusca
- Class: Gastropoda
- Subclass: Caenogastropoda
- Order: incertae sedis
- Family: Ampullinidae
- Genus: †Ampullinopsis; Conrad 1865

Synonyms
- Ampullina (Ampullinopsis) (alternative spelling); Globularia (Ampullinopsis) (alternative spelling)

= Ampullinopsis =

Ampullinopsis Temporal range: Paleocene – Miocene

Extinct genus of gastropods

Ampullinopsis is an extinct taxonomic genus of deep-water sea snails, marine gastropod molluscs in the clade Sorbeoconcha. These sea snails were epifaunal grazers. Sea snails of this genus lived from Paleocene epoch to Miocene epoch (age range: 48.6 to 20.43 million years ago).

== Species ==
- Ampullinopsis birmanica Vredenburg 1922
- Ampullinopsis crassatina Lamarck 1804
- Ampullinopsis spenceri Cooke 1919
- Ampullinopsis (Globularia) altivapicana Eames 1952
