= Ittibittium oryza =

Scientific classification
- Kingdom: Animalia
- Phylum: Mollusca
- Class: Gastropoda
- Subclass: Caenogastropoda
- Order: incertae sedis
- Family: Cerithiidae
- Genus: Ittibittium
- Species: I. oryza

Binomial name
- Ittibittium oryza (Mörch, 1876)

Synonyms
- Bittium oryza (Mörch, 1876); Bittium varium var. turricula Usticke, 1969; Cerithium (Bittium) oryza Mörch, 1876

Species of gastropod

Ittibittium oryza is a species of sea snail, a marine gastropod mollusk in the family Cerithiidae.

== Description ==
The maximum recorded shell length is 3 mm.

== Habitat ==
Minimum recorded depth is 0 m. Maximum recorded depth is 52 m.
