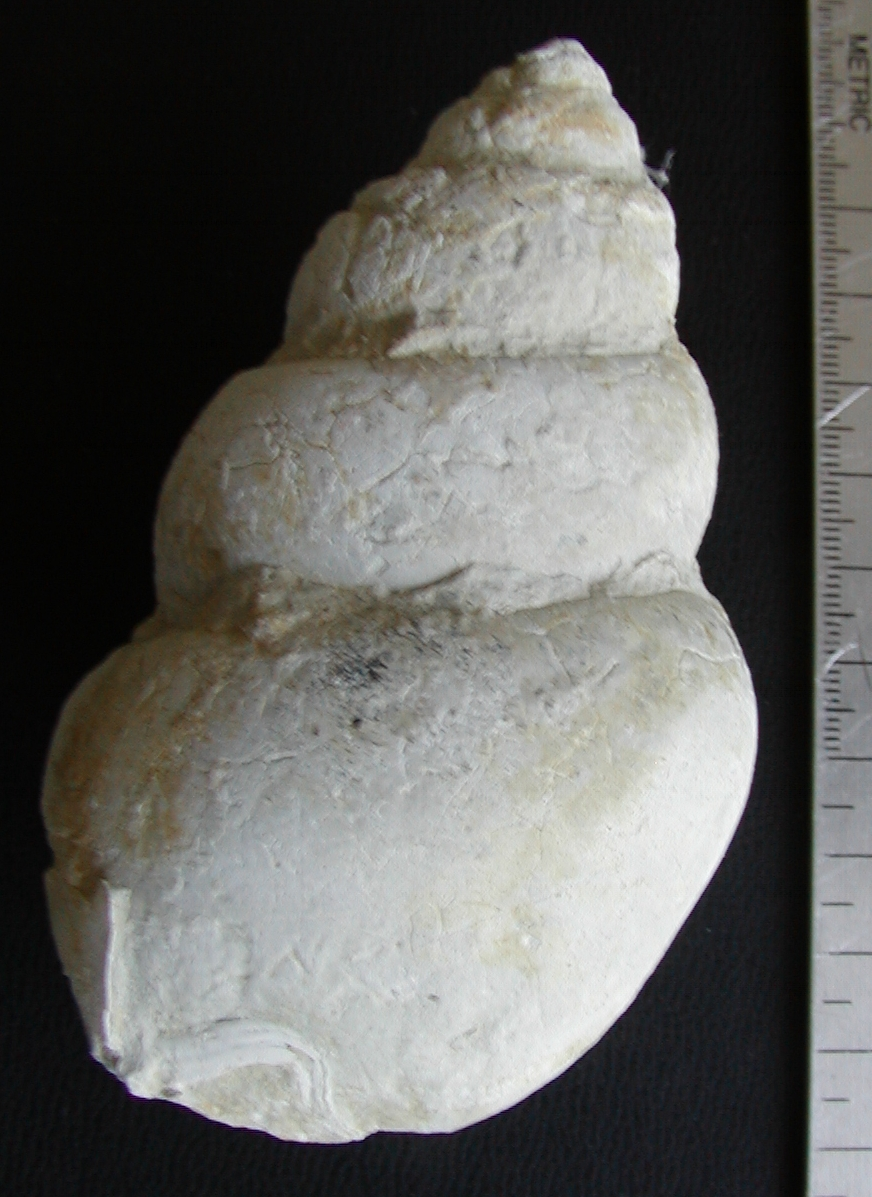
- Fossil of a Tylostoma species from the lower Cretaceous of central Texas

Scientific classification
- Kingdom: Animalia
- Phylum: Mollusca
- Class: Gastropoda
- Subclass: Caenogastropoda
- Order: incertae sedis
- Superfamily: Campaniloidea
- Family: †Tylostomatidae; Stoliczka, 1868

= Tylostomatidae =

Extinct family of gastropods

Tylostomatidae is an extinct family of fossil sea snails, marine gastropod molluscs in the superfamily Campaniloidea, the true conchs and their allies.

== Genera ==
Genera within the family Tylostomatidae include:

- Eopterodonta
- Tylostoma, the type genus
