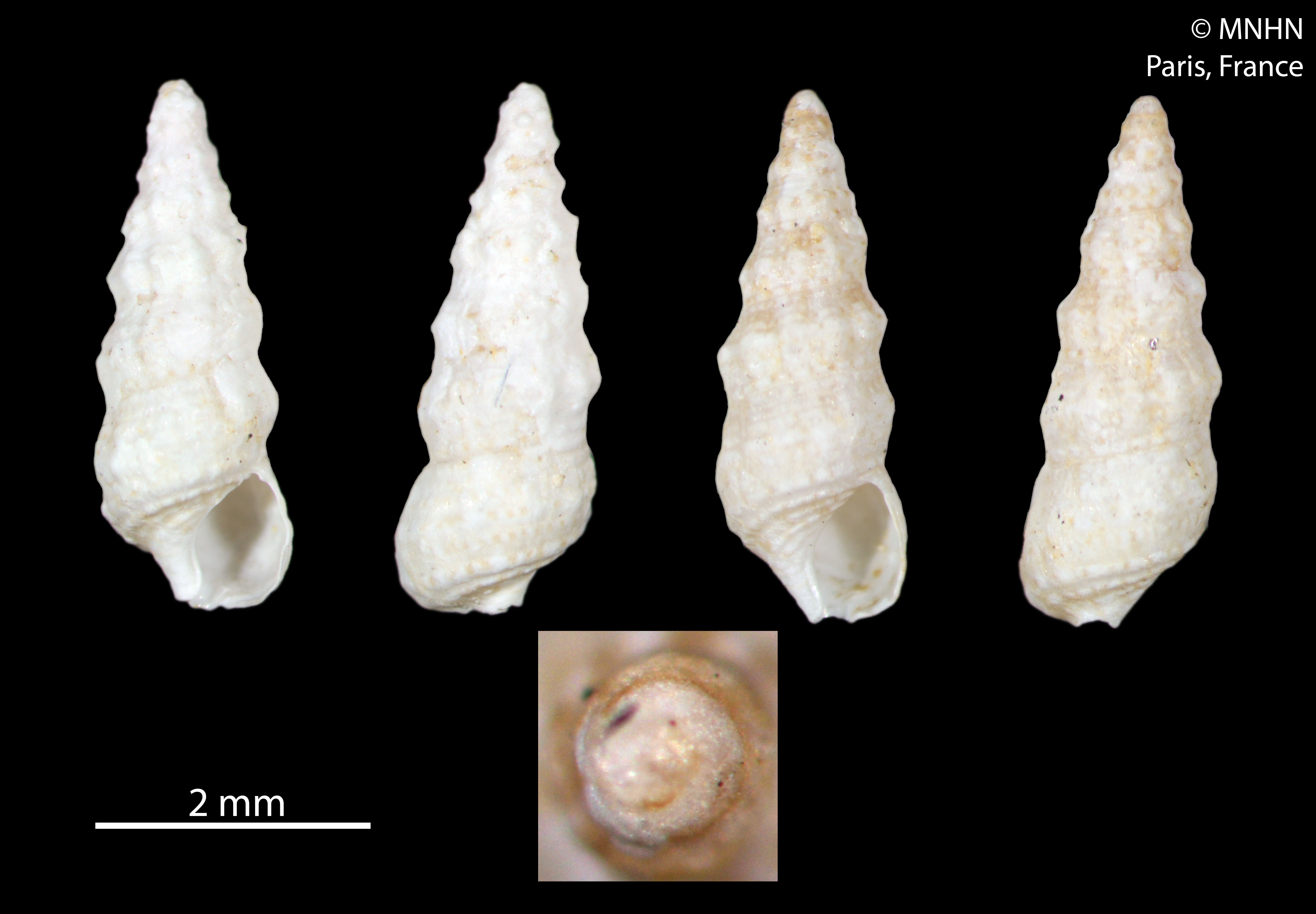
- Shell of Ittibittium houbricki

Scientific classification
- Kingdom: Animalia
- Phylum: Mollusca
- Class: Gastropoda
- Subclass: Caenogastropoda
- Order: incertae sedis
- Superfamily: Cerithioidea
- Family: Cerithiidae
- Genus: Ittibittium; Houbrick, 1993

Species
- See text

= Ittibittium =

Genus of gastropods

Ittibittium is a genus of very small sea snails, marine gastropod mollusks in the family Cerithiidae.

== Species ==
Species within the genus Ittibittium include:

- Ittibittium houbricki (Ponder, 1993)
- Ittibittium oryza (Mörch, 1876)
- Ittibittium parcum (Gould, 1861)

Species brought into synonymy

- Ittibittium nipponkaiense (Habe & Masuda, 1990): synonym of Ittibittium parcum (Gould, 1861)
- Ittibittium turricula (Usticke, 1969): synonym of Ittibittium oryza (Mörch, 1876)
- Ittibittium turriculum [sic] accepted as Ittibittium turricula (Usticke, 1969): synonym of Ittibittium oryza (Mörch, 1876) (misspelling)
