= Settsassiidae =

Scientific classification
- Kingdom: Animalia
- Phylum: Mollusca
- Class: Gastropoda
- Subclass: Caenogastropoda
- Order: incertae sedis
- Superfamily: Campaniloidea
- Family: †Settsassiidae; Bandel, 1992

Extinct family of gastropods

Settsassiidae is an extinct family of fossil sea snails, marine gastropod molluscs in the superfamily]] Campaniloidea.

According to the taxonomy of the Gastropoda by Bouchet & Rocroi (2005), the family Settsassiidae has no subfamilies and is unassigned to a superfamily.
