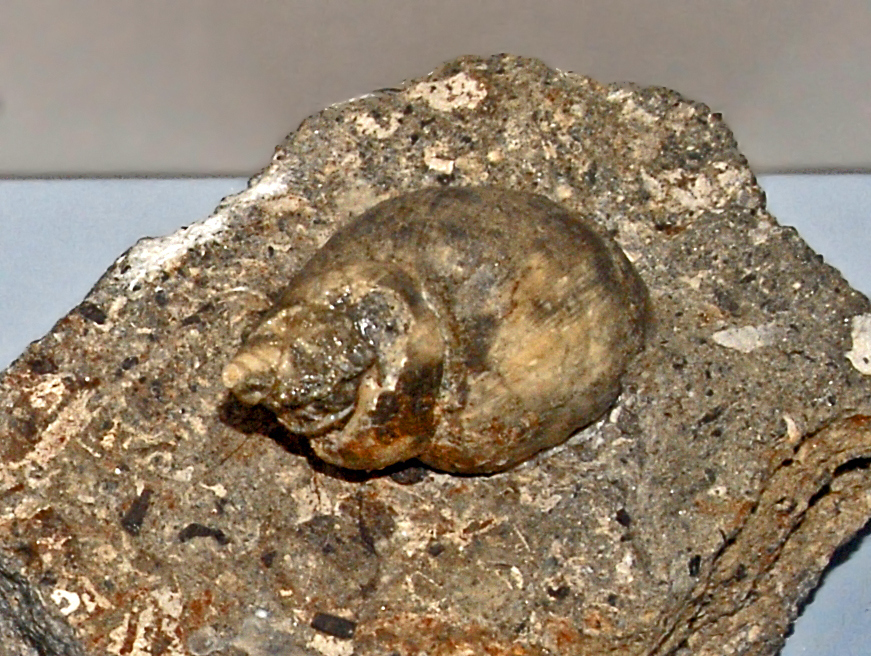
- Fossil shell of Crommium ferrugineum

Scientific classification
- Kingdom: Animalia
- Phylum: Mollusca
- Class: Gastropoda
- Subclass: Caenogastropoda
- Order: incertae sedis
- Family: Ampullinidae
- Genus: †Crommium; Cossmann, 1888

Synonyms
- Amaurellina (Crommium) Cossmann, 1904 †

= Crommium =

Crommium Temporal range: Paleocene - Eocene

Extinct genus of gastropods

Crommium is an extinct genus of sea snails, marine gastropod molluscs in the family Ampullinidae.

== Species ==
Species within the genus Crommium include:

- † Crommium andersoni Dickerson, 1914
- † Crommium angustatum Grateloup, 1828
- † Crommium ferrugineum (Great.)
- † Crommium globosa Perrilliat et al., 2006
- † Crommium hosgori Pacaud, 2016
- † Crommium intermedia Deshayes, 1832
- † Crommium masinguiensis Clark and Durham, 1946
- † Crommium palmasensis Clark and Durham, 1946
- † Crommium palmerae Clark and Durham, 1946
- † Crommium perovatum Conrad, 1846
- † Crommium pinyonensis Dickerson, 1914
- † Crommium pseudowillemeti Eames, 1952
- † Crommium rouaulti d'Archiac and Haime, 1854
- † Crommium willemettii Deshayes, 1825

Fossils of the sea snails within this genus have been found in sediments of Europe, United States, Colombia, Somalia and Nigeria from Paleocene to Eocene (age range: 61.7 to 23.03 million years ago).

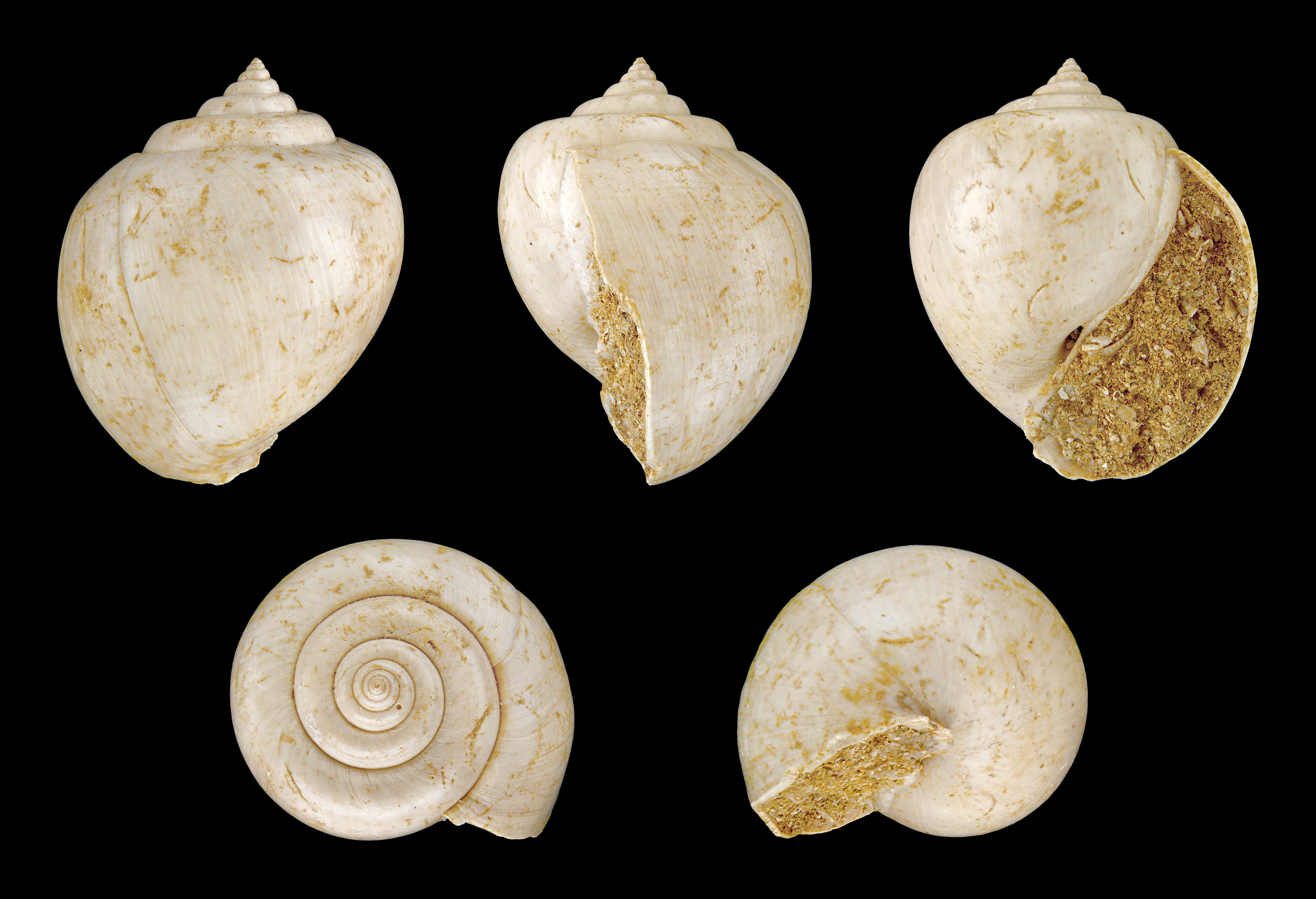
Crommium acutum

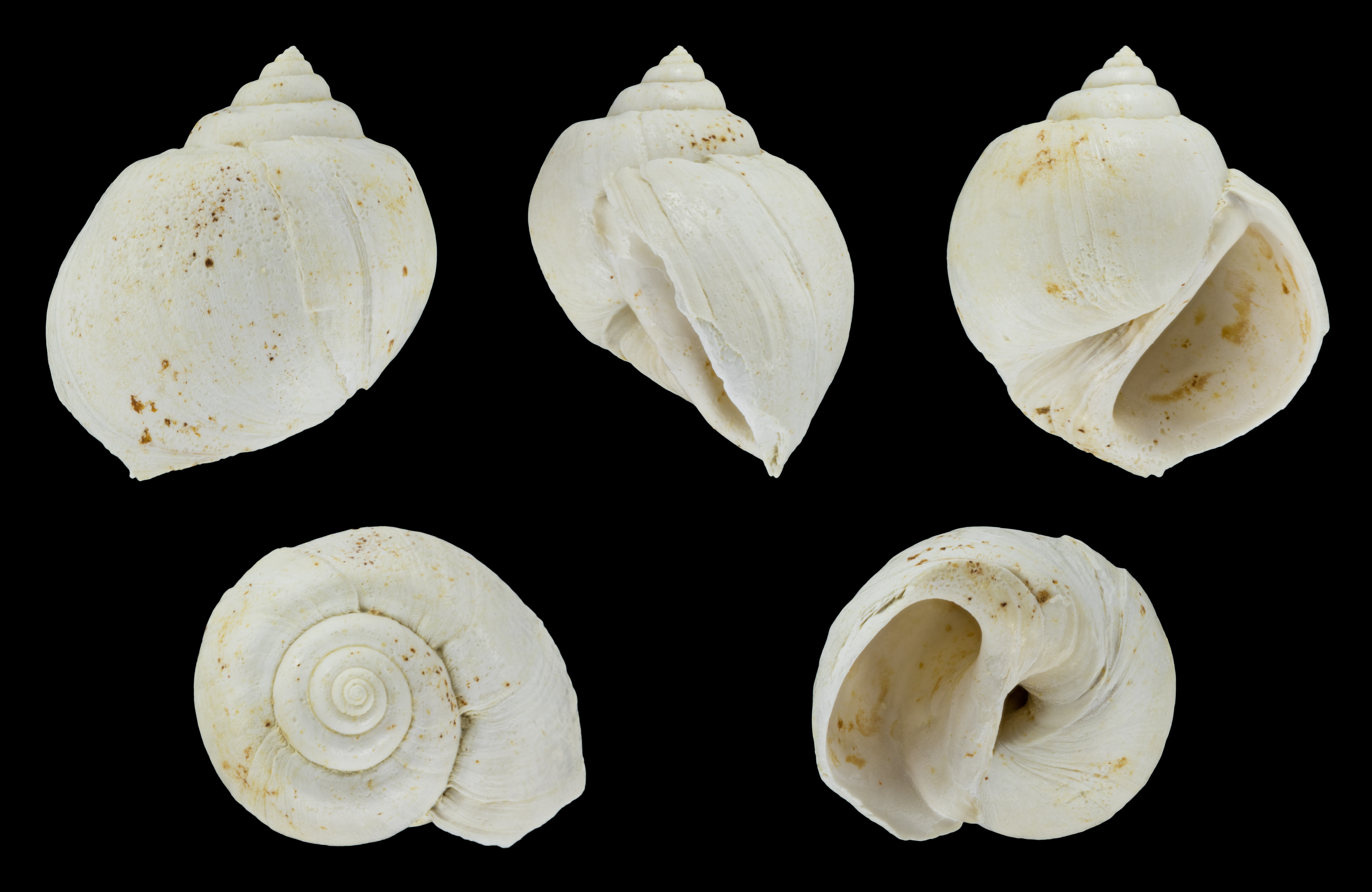
Crommium ponderosum
