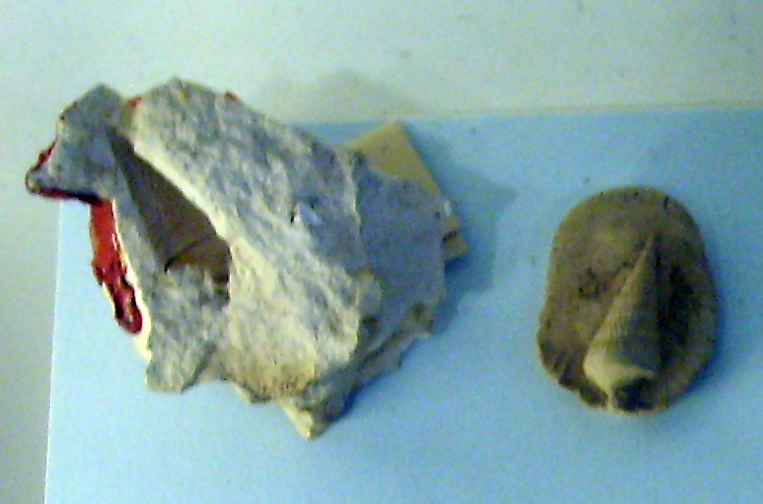
- Metacerithium balticum fossil at the Geological Museum, Copenhagen.

Scientific classification
- Kingdom: Animalia
- Phylum: Mollusca
- Class: Gastropoda
- Subclass: Caenogastropoda
- Order: incertae sedis
- Superfamily: Campaniloidea
- Family: †Metacerithiidae; Cossmann, 1906

Synonyms
- † Terebrellidae Delpey, 1941 (invalid: type genus a junior homonym )

= Metacerithiidae =

Metacerithiidae Temporal range: 145.5–55.8 Ma

Extinct family of gastropods

Metacerithiidae is an extinct family of fossil sea snails, marine gastropod molluscs in the superfamily Campaniloidea.

According to the taxonomy of the Gastropoda by Bouchet & Rocroi (2005) the family Metacerithiidae has no subfamilies.

== Genera ==
Genera within the family Metacerithiidae include:

- † Diatrypesis Tomlin, 1929
- † Metacerithium Cossmann, 1906 - the type genus
- † Nerineopsis Cossmann, 1906

Synonyms

- † Terebrella Andreae, 1887 : synonym of † Diatrypesis Tomlin, 1929 (invalid: junior homonym of Terebrella Maltzan, 1887; Trypetes Tomlin, 1929, is a replacement name)
- † Trypetes Tomlin, 1929 : synonym of † Diatrypesis Tomlin, 1929 (invalid: junior homonym of Trypetes Schenck, 1859; Diatrypesis is a replacement name)
