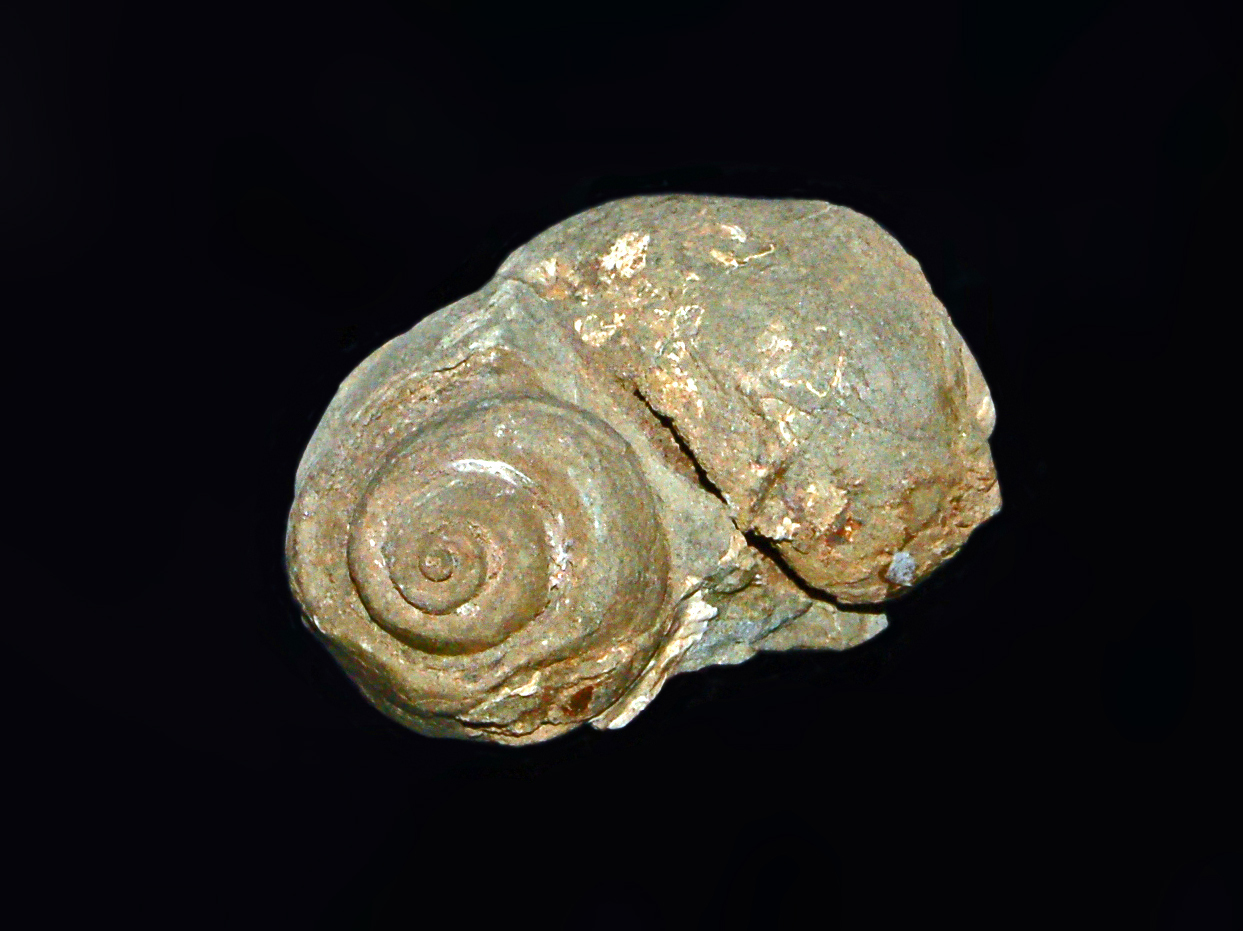
- Shell of Ampullina sp. - Oligocene from Savona (Italy)

Scientific classification
- Kingdom: Animalia
- Phylum: Mollusca
- Class: Gastropoda
- Subclass: Caenogastropoda
- Order: incertae sedis
- Family: Ampullinidae
- Genus: †Ampullina

Type species
- Natica depressa Lamarck, 1844

Synonyms
- Natica (Ampullina) (alternative spelling); Ampullella Cox 1931; Globularia (Ampulella) Cox 1931

= Ampullina =

Ampullina Temporal range: Middle Triassic-Early Pliocene, Anisian–Zanclean

Extinct genus of gastropods

Ampullina is an extinct taxonomic genus of deep-water sea snails, marine gastropod molluscs in the clade Caenogastropoda. These sea snails were epifaunal grazers. They lived from the Middle Triassic period to the Lower Pliocene age.

== Species ==
- Ampullina aethiopica Jaboli, 1959
- Ampullina anguillana Cooke, 1919
- Ampullina bravoensis Olsson, 1931
- Ampullina butleri McNamara & Kendrick, 1994
- Ampullina effusa Tate, 1893
- Ampullina? multistriata (Baily, 1855)
- Ampullina ortoni Gabb, 1870
- Ampullina packardi Popenoe, 1937
- Ampullina paracasina Rivera, 1957
- Ampullina pichinka Cataldo & Lazo, 2016
- Ampullina solidula Dall, 1892
- Ampullina subhumerosa White, 1887
- Ampullina vastanensis Banerjee & Halder, 2024
- Ampullina vaughani Cooke, 1928
- Ampullina woodsi Hanna & Israelsky, 1925
- Ampullina gabbi Clark, 1917
