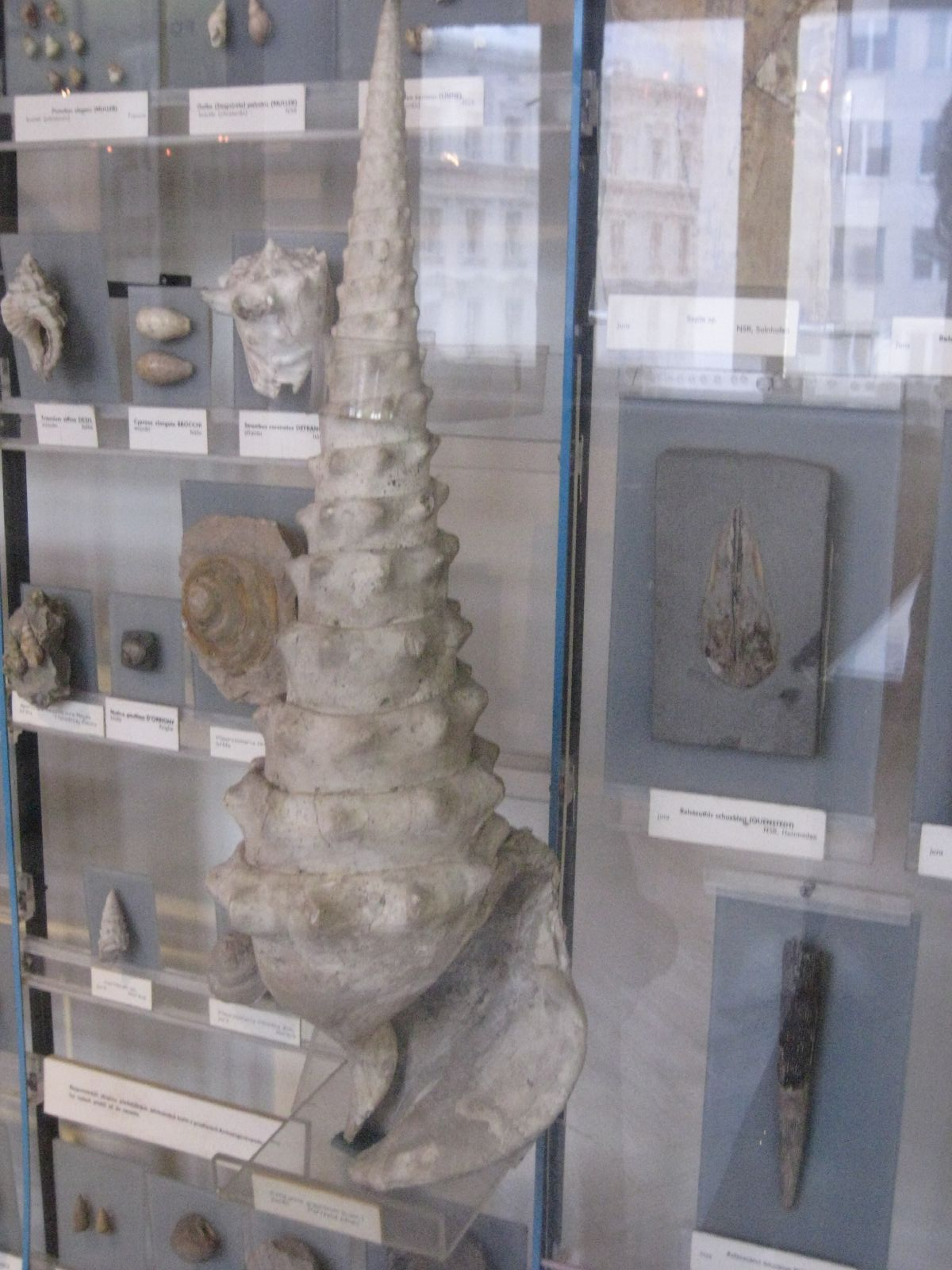
- Shell of the fossil species Campanile giganteum

Scientific classification
- Kingdom: Animalia
- Phylum: Mollusca
- Class: Gastropoda
- Subclass: Caenogastropoda
- Family: Campanilidae
- Genus: Campanile; Bayle in Fischer, 1884

Synonyms
- † Campanile (Campanilopa) Iredale, 1917 · accepted, alternate representation; † Campinalopa Iredale, 1917; Ceratoptilus Bouvier, 1887 (junior objective synonym of Campanile); Cerithium (Campanile) P. Fischer, 1884 (original rank)

= Campanile (gastropod) =

Campanile Temporal range: Eocene– Recent

Genus of gastropods

Campanile is a genus of large sea snails, marine gastropod molluscs in the family Campanilidae.

== Biology ==
All species in this genus have become extinct, except Campanile symbolicum Iredale, 1917 from southwestern Australia. They used to flourish in the Tethys Sea and underwent a widespread adaptive radiation in the Cenozoic.

== Species ==
Species within the genus Campanile include:

- † Campanile auvertianum
- † Campanile brookmani Cox 1930
- † Campanile claytonense
- † Campanile cornucopiae
- † Campanile dilloni
- † Campanile elongatum
- † Campanile giganteum (Lamarck, 1804) - a gigantic fossil species from the Eocene
- † Campanile gigas Martin 1881
- † Campanile greenellum
- † Campanile hebertianum
- † Campanile houbricki
- † Campanile parisiense
- † Campanile paratum
- Campanile symbolicum Iredale, 1917 - a living Australian species. This is the only extant species of Campanilidae.
- † Campanile tchihatcheffi d’Archiac 1850
- † Campanile trevorjacksoni Portell & Donovan, 2008 - a fossil species from the Eocene
- † Campanile uniplicatum (d'Orbigny, 1850)
- † Campanile villaltai
