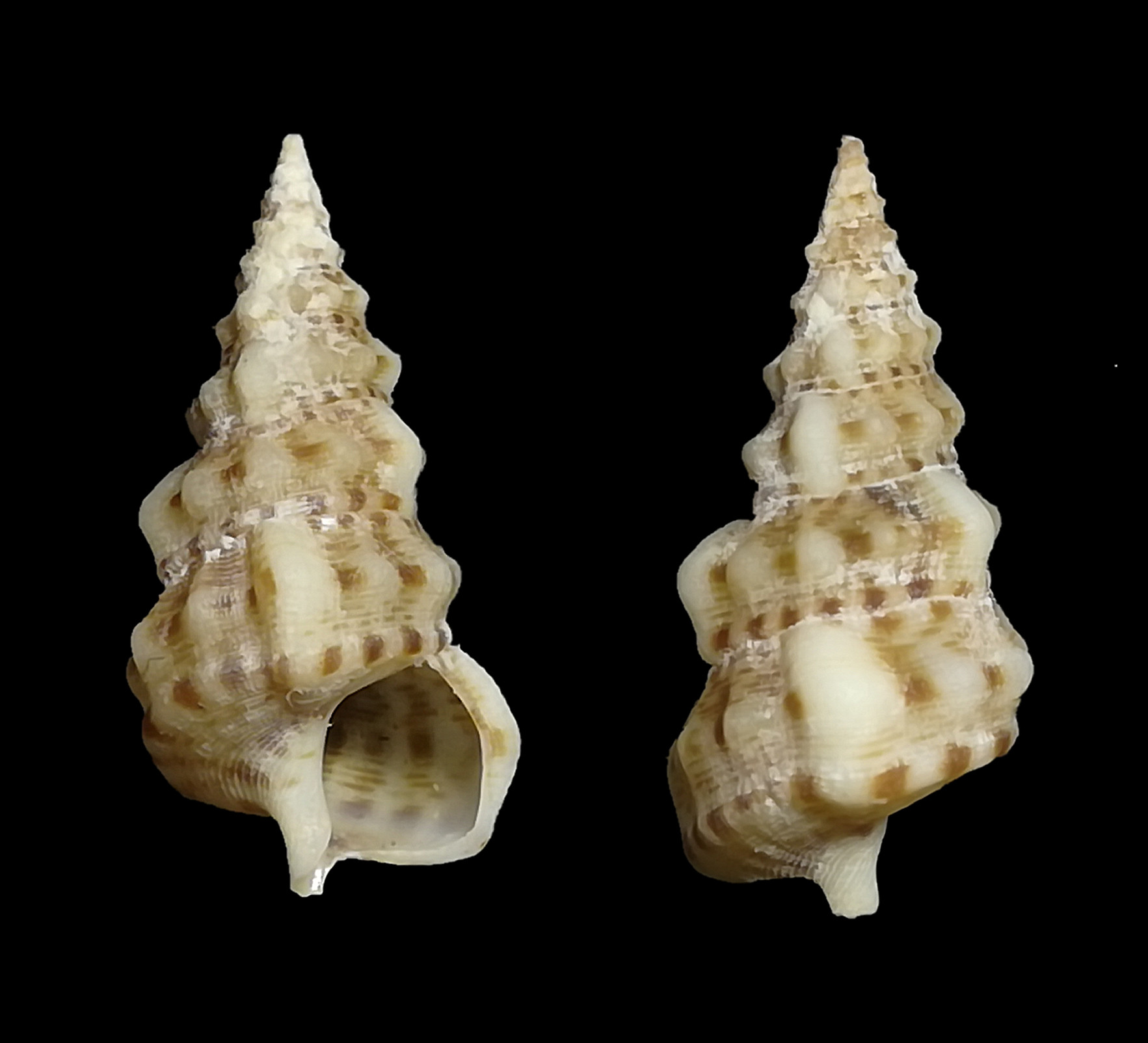

Scientific classification
- Kingdom: Animalia
- Phylum: Mollusca
- Class: Gastropoda
- Subclass: Caenogastropoda
- Order: incertae sedis
- Family: Plesiotrochidae
- Genus: Plesiotrochus
- Species: P. monachus

Binomial name
- Plesiotrochus monachus (Crosse & P. Fischer, 1864)

= Plesiotrochus monachus =

Species of gastropod

Plesiotrochus monachus is a species of sea snail, a marine gastropod mollusc in the family Plesiotrochidae.

== Distribution ==
This species occurs from New South Wales to Fremantle, Australia.
