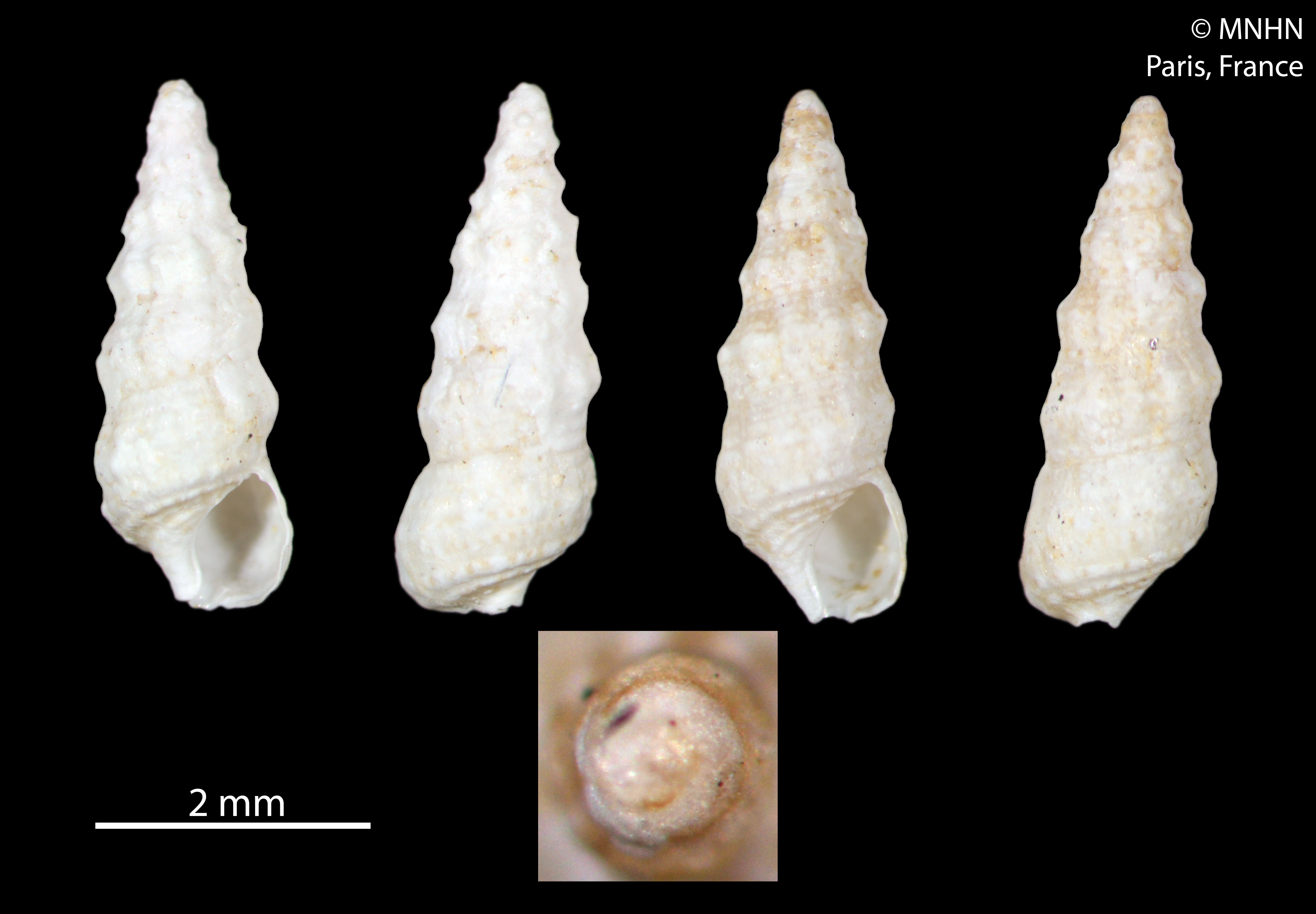
- Shell of Ittibittium houbricki (paratype at MNHN, Paris)

Scientific classification
- Kingdom: Animalia
- Phylum: Mollusca
- Class: Gastropoda
- Subclass: Caenogastropoda
- Order: incertae sedis
- Family: Cerithiidae
- Genus: Ittibittium
- Species: I. houbricki

Binomial name
- Ittibittium houbricki (Ponder, 1993)

Synonyms
- Bittium houbricki Ponder, 1993

= Ittibittium houbricki =

Species of gastropod

Ittibittium houbricki is a species of sea snail, a marine gastropod mollusk in the family Cerithiidae.

== Distribution ==
This marine species occurs off Western Australia.
