= Ittibittium parcum =

Scientific classification
- Kingdom: Animalia
- Phylum: Mollusca
- Class: Gastropoda
- Subclass: Caenogastropoda
- Order: incertae sedis
- Family: Cerithiidae
- Genus: Ittibittium
- Species: I. parcum

Binomial name
- Ittibittium parcum (Gould, 1861)

Synonyms
- Bittium parcum Gould, 1861; Cerithium hawaiensis Pilsbry & Vanatta, 1905; Ittibittium nipponkaiense (Habe & Masuda, 1990); Plesiotrochus nipponkaiense Habe & Masuda, 1990

Species of gastropod

Ittibittium parcum is a species of sea snail, a marine gastropod mollusk in the family Cerithiidae.
