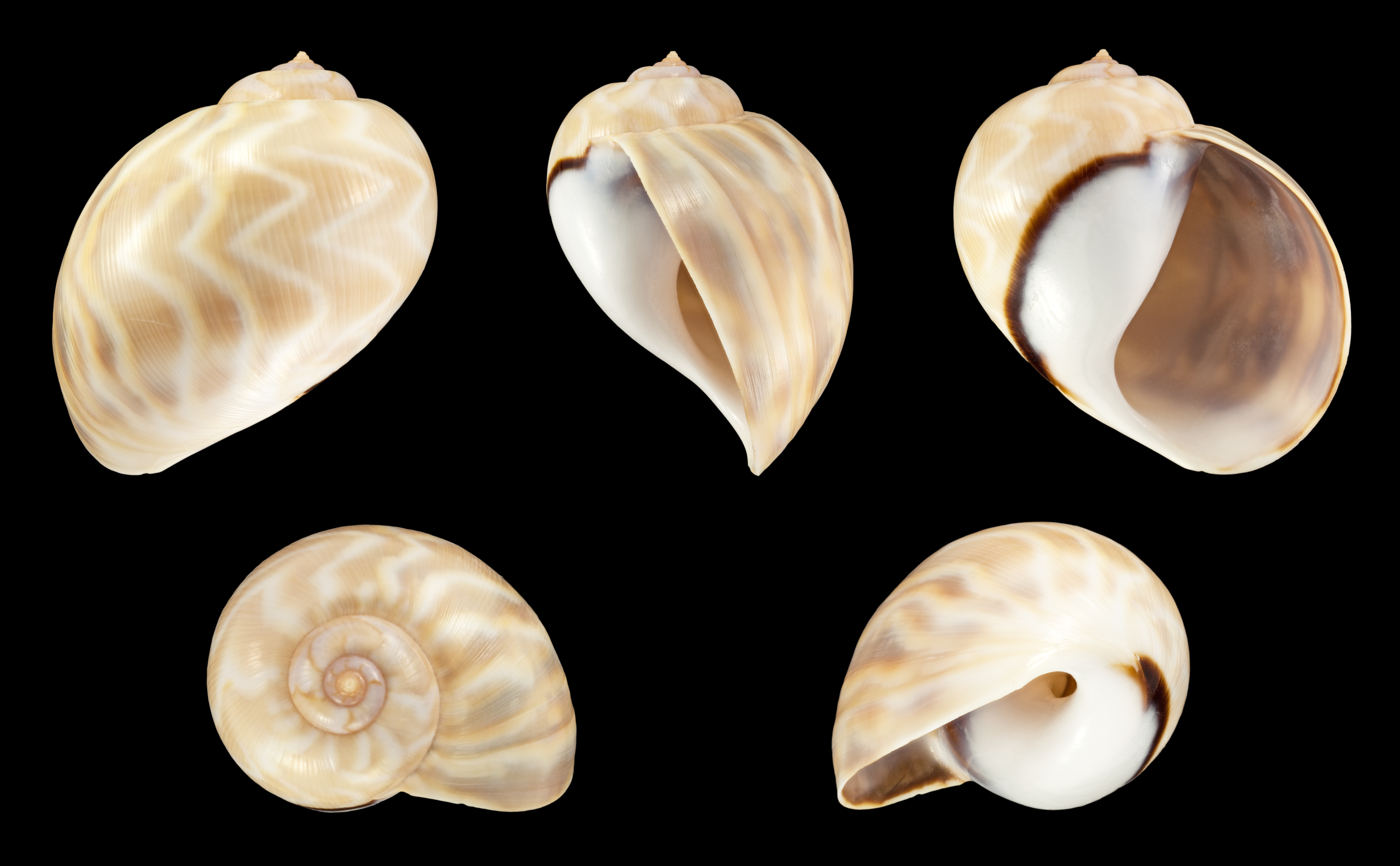
- Five views of a C. fluctuata shell

Scientific classification
- Kingdom: Animalia
- Phylum: Mollusca
- Class: Gastropoda
- Subclass: Caenogastropoda
- Order: incertae sedis
- Family: Ampullinidae
- Genus: Cernina
- Species: C. fluctuata

Binomial name
- Cernina fluctuata (G. B. Sowerby I, 1825)

Synonyms
- Globularia fluctuata (G. B. Sowerby I, 1825); Natica fluctuata G. B. Sowerby I, 1825; Natica imperforata Jay, 1836

= Cernina fluctuata =

Species of gastropod

Cernina fluctuata, common name the wavy moon snail, is a species of marine gastropod mollusc in the family Ampullinidae. It is the only living member of its family.

== Description ==
The shells of this species range in size from 25 to 80 mm.

This species resembles the moon snails of the family Naticidae, though it is not related. One way to differentiate this shell from that of true moon snails is by its lack of an umbilical callus. The color pattern is one of wavy or zigzag stipes crossing the width of the shell.

== Distribution ==
This species is native to the Philippines and northern Borneo.

== Diet ==
Cernina fluctuata is an herbivore that grazes on algae. This is in contrast to true moon snails, which are predators.
