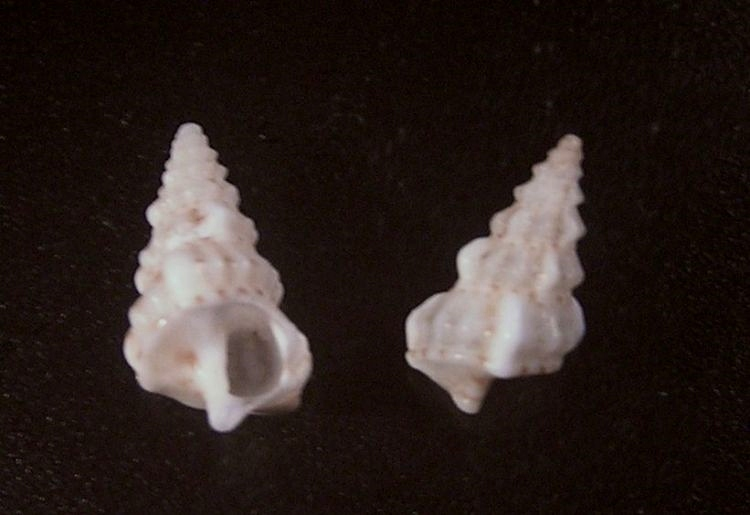
- Two shells of Plesiotrochus monachus

Scientific classification
- Kingdom: Animalia
- Phylum: Mollusca
- Class: Gastropoda
- Subclass: Caenogastropoda
- Order: incertae sedis
- Superfamily: Campaniloidea
- Family: Plesiotrochidae; Houbrick, 1990

= Plesiotrochidae =

Family of gastropods

Plesiotrochidae is a family of sea snails, marine gastropod molluscs in the clade Sorbeoconcha. According to the taxonomy of the Gastropoda by Bouchet & Rocroi (2005) the family Plesiotrochidae has no subfamilies.

== Genera ==
Genera within the family Plesiotrochidae include:

- Plesiotrochus P. Fischer, 1878
- Trochocerithium Sacco, 1897

Genera brought into synonymy

- Hemicerithium Cossmann, 1893: synonym of Plesiotrochus Fischer, 1878
- Hypotrochus Cotton, 1932: synonym of Plesiotrochus Fischer, 1878
