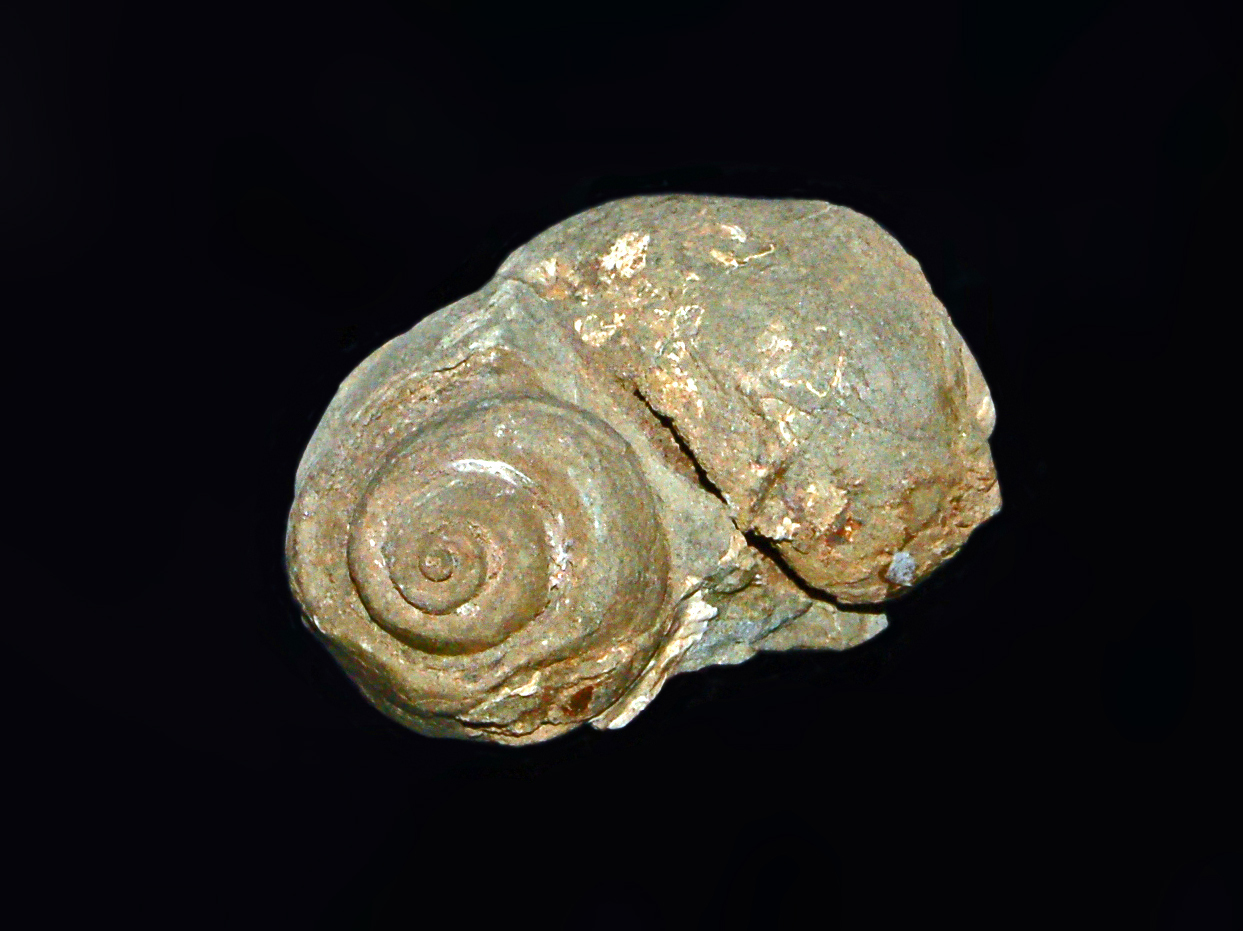
- Shell of Ampullina sp. - Oligocene from Savona (Italy)

Scientific classification
- Kingdom: Animalia
- Phylum: Mollusca
- Class: Gastropoda
- Subclass: Caenogastropoda
- Order: incertae sedis
- Superfamily: Campaniloidea
- Family: Ampullinidae; Cossmann, 1918

Synonyms
- Ampullospiridae Cox, 1930; Gyrodinae Wenz, 1938; Globulariinae Wenz, 1941; Pseudamauridae Kowalke & Bandel, 1996

= Ampullinidae =

Family of gastropods

Ampullinidae are a mostly extinct taxonomic family of sea snails, marine gastropod molluscs in the clade Caenogastropoda.

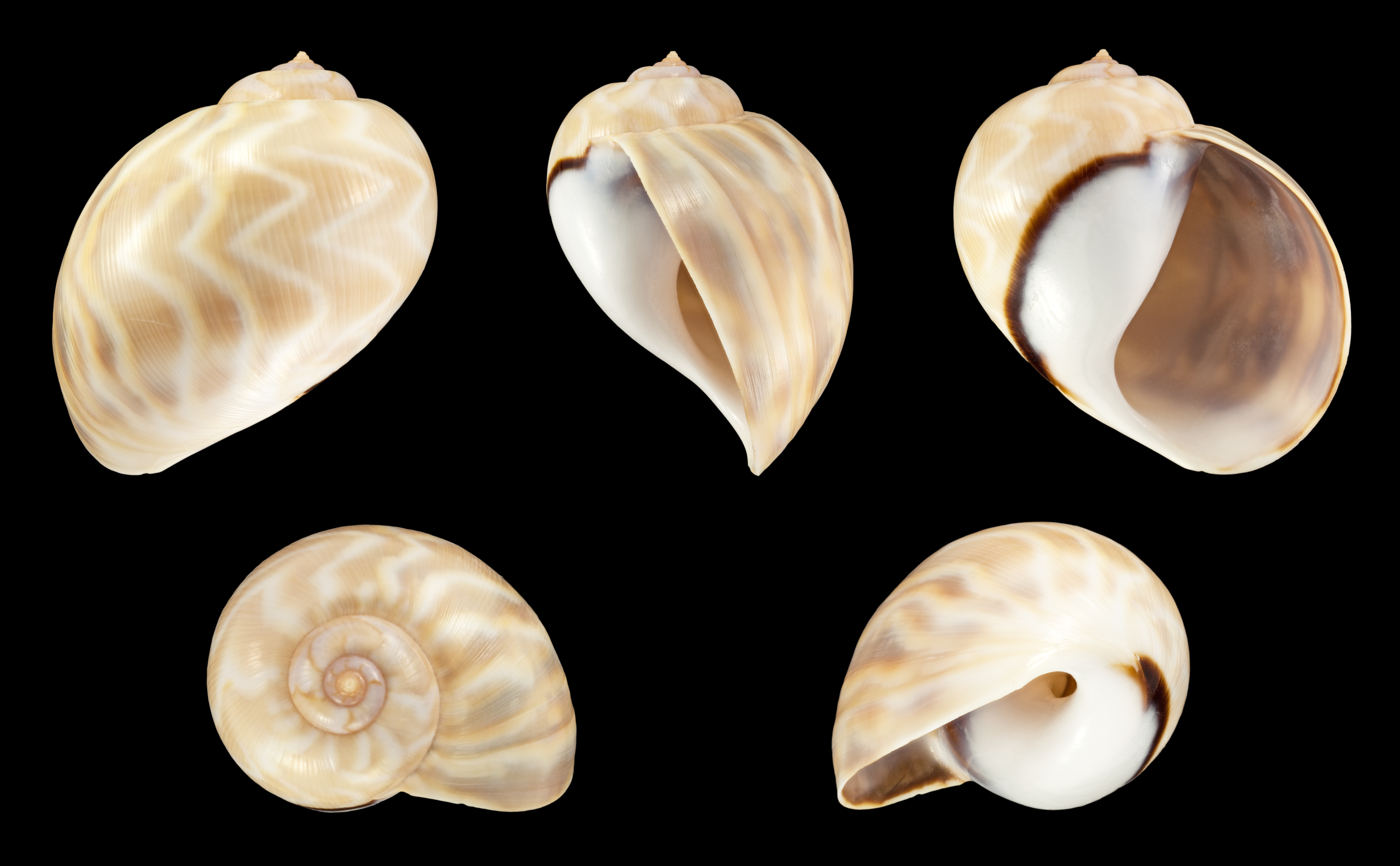
Cernina fluctuata (Sowerby, 1825)

The shells of species in this family resemble those of naticids. Sea snails of this family lived from the Triassic period to the Pliocene age of the Cenozoic.

But when the extant species Cernina fluctuata is considered as a member of this family, then Ampullinidae is extant.

== Taxonomy ==
No subfamilies in this family are recognized in the taxonomy of Bouchet & Rocroi (2005).

The contents and synonymy of Ampullinidae have been treated by the World Register of Marine Species after Lozouet et al. (2001), Kase & Ishikawa (2003) and Bandel (2006). The position in Campaniloidea is based on anatomical data on Cernina fluctuata (Kase, 1990; Healy, pers. comm., sperm morphology), but Ampullinoidea is treated as distinct superfamily by Lozouet et al. (2001) and Bandel (2006).

== Genera ==
Genera within the family Ampullinidae include:

- Ampullina Bowdich, 1822 - the type genus
- Amaurellina Fischer 1885
- Ampullinopsis Conrad 1865
- Ampullonatica Sacco 1890
- Cernina Gray, 1842
- Crommium Cossmann, 1888
- Globularia Swainson 1840
- Pachycrommium Woodring 1928
- Warakia Harzhauser 2007
