= Joseph Henri Ferdinand Douvillé =

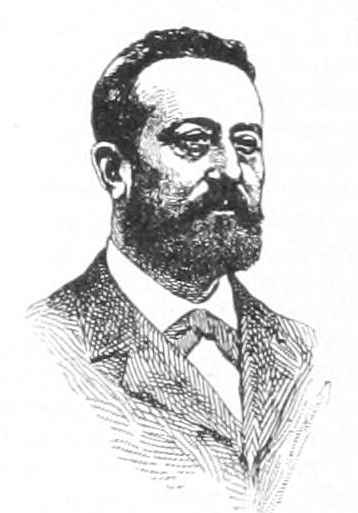

Joseph Henri Ferdinand Douvillé (French pronunciation: [ʒozɛf ɑ̃ʁi fɛʁdinɑ̃ duvile]; 16 June 1846 – 19 January 1937), also known as Henri Douvillé, was French paleontologist, geologist and malacologist. Douvillé worked as a mining engineer in Bourges (1872) and Limoges (1874), afterwards serving as professeur suppléant of paleontology at the École des Mines. From 1881 to 1911 he was a professor of paleontology at the École des Mines.

== Contributions and distinctions ==
For over four decades he was tasked with organizing the collection of paleontology at the École des Mines, and because of his efforts, it became a primary focus of paleontological research in France. Within this time period (1871-1883), he also made contributions to the geological map of France.

Douvillé performed stratigraphical and paleontological research from fossils reported by geologists in the Middle East, North Africa, Central America, Madagascar, etc. He is credited for providing determinations of numerous paleontological species, and was a leading authority on ammonites.

In 1881 he was appointed president of the Société géologique de France, and in 1907 became a member of the Académie des Sciences. Also he was:

- winner of the "Prix Fontannes" (1898).
- officer of the "Légion d'Honneur" (1905).
- Médaille Gaudry of the Société géologique de France (1912).

== Written works ==
- Sur quelques Brachiopodes du terrain jurassique, (1886).
- Mission Scientifique en Perse par J. de Morgan 3(4), (1904).
- Le Crétacé et l'Eocéne du Tibet central, (1916).
