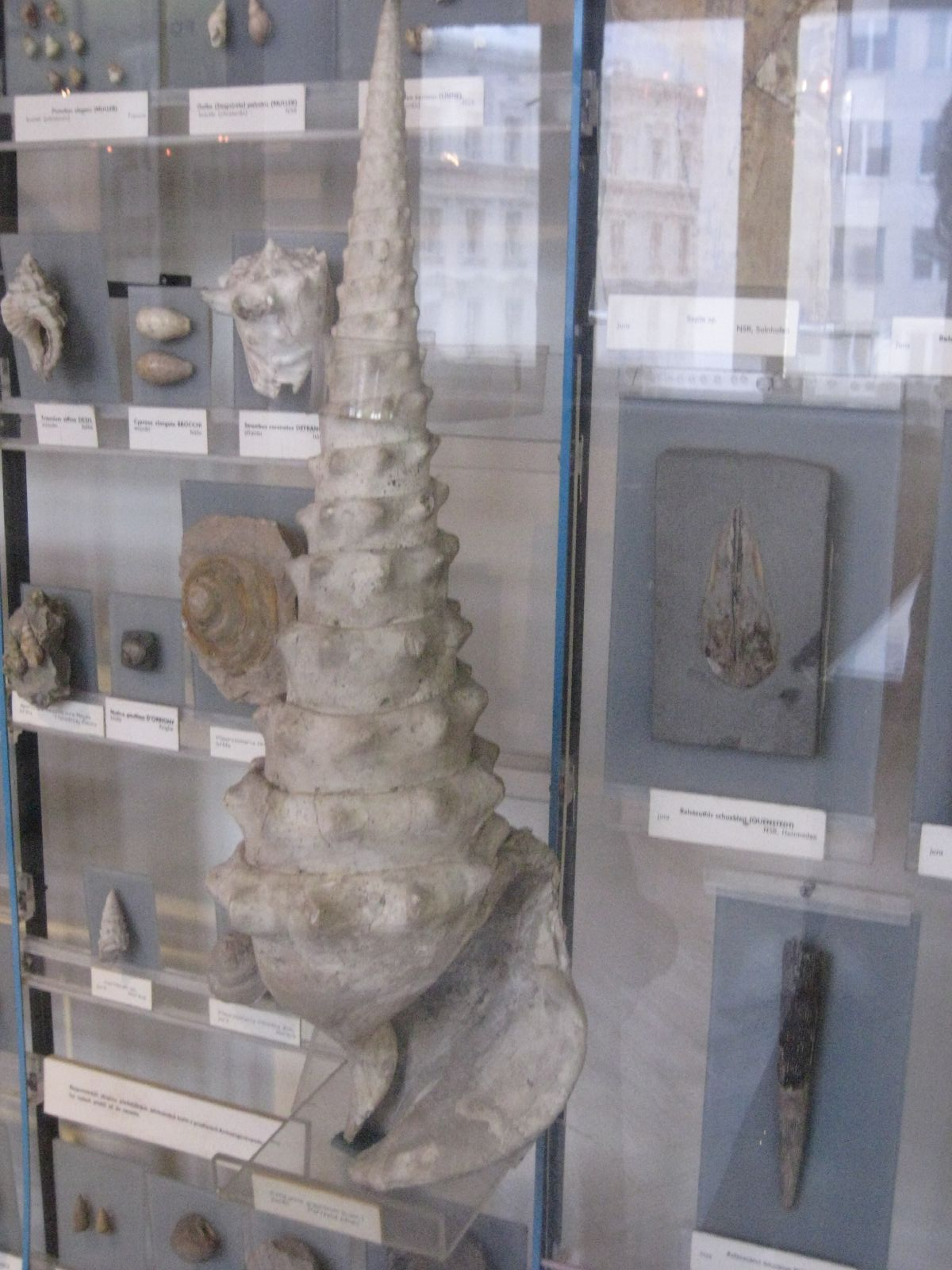
- Shell of Campanile giganteum

Scientific classification
- Kingdom: Animalia
- Phylum: Mollusca
- Class: Gastropoda
- Subclass: Caenogastropoda
- Order: incertae sedis
- Family: Campanilidae
- Genus: Campanile
- Species: C. giganteum

Binomial name
- Campanile giganteum (Lamarck, 1804)

= Campanile giganteum =

Campanile giganteum Temporal range: Early–Middle Eocene

Species of gastropod

†Campanile giganteum is an extinct species of marine gastropod mollusk in the family Campanilidae. It lived during the Eocene, approximately 40–50 million years ago during the Eocene Epoch. Its shell typically measured 40–90 cm (16–35 in) in length, although specimens exceeding 120 cm (47 in) have also been reported. It is considered one of the largest known shelled gastropods by shell length. Its fossils are found primarily in the Paris Basin of France.
