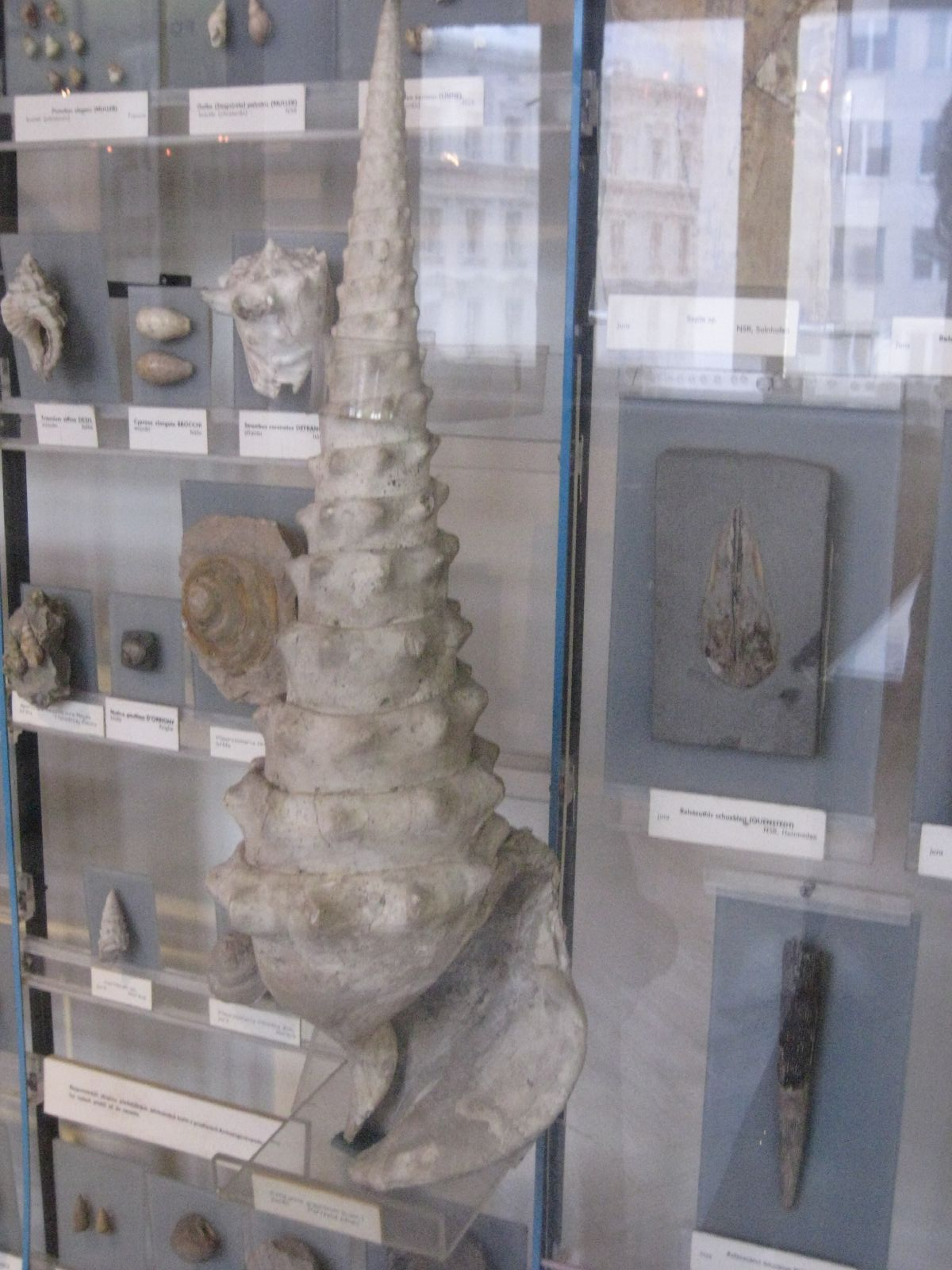
- Fossil shell of Campanile giganteum

Scientific classification
- Kingdom: Animalia
- Phylum: Mollusca
- Class: Gastropoda
- Subclass: Caenogastropoda
- Order: incertae sedis
- Superfamily: Campaniloidea
- Family: Campanilidae; Douvillé, 1904

Genera
- See text

Synonyms
- Diozoptyxinae Pchelintsev, 1960; Gymnocerithidae Golikov & Starobogatov, 1987

= Campanilidae =

Family of gastropods

Campanilidae are a taxonomic family of sea snails, marine gastropod molluscs in the clade Sorbeoconcha (an alternative representation of the clade Caenogastropoda).

== Taxonomy ==
There are no subfamilies in Campanilidae recognized in the taxonomy of Bouchet & Rocroi (2005).

== Genera ==
Genera within the family Campanilidae include:

- Campanile Bayle [in P. Fisher], 1864 - type genus; type species of this genus is fossil
