= Clavocerithium =

Scientific classification
- Kingdom: Animalia
- Phylum: Mollusca
- Class: Gastropoda
- Subclass: Caenogastropoda
- Order: incertae sedis
- Family: Cerithiidae
- Genus: Clavocerithium; Cossmann, 1920

Genus of gastropods

Clavocerithium is a genus of sea snails, marine gastropod mollusks in the family Cerithiidae.

== Species ==
Species within the genus Clavocerithium include:

- Clavocerithium taeniatum (Quoy & Gaimard, 1834)
