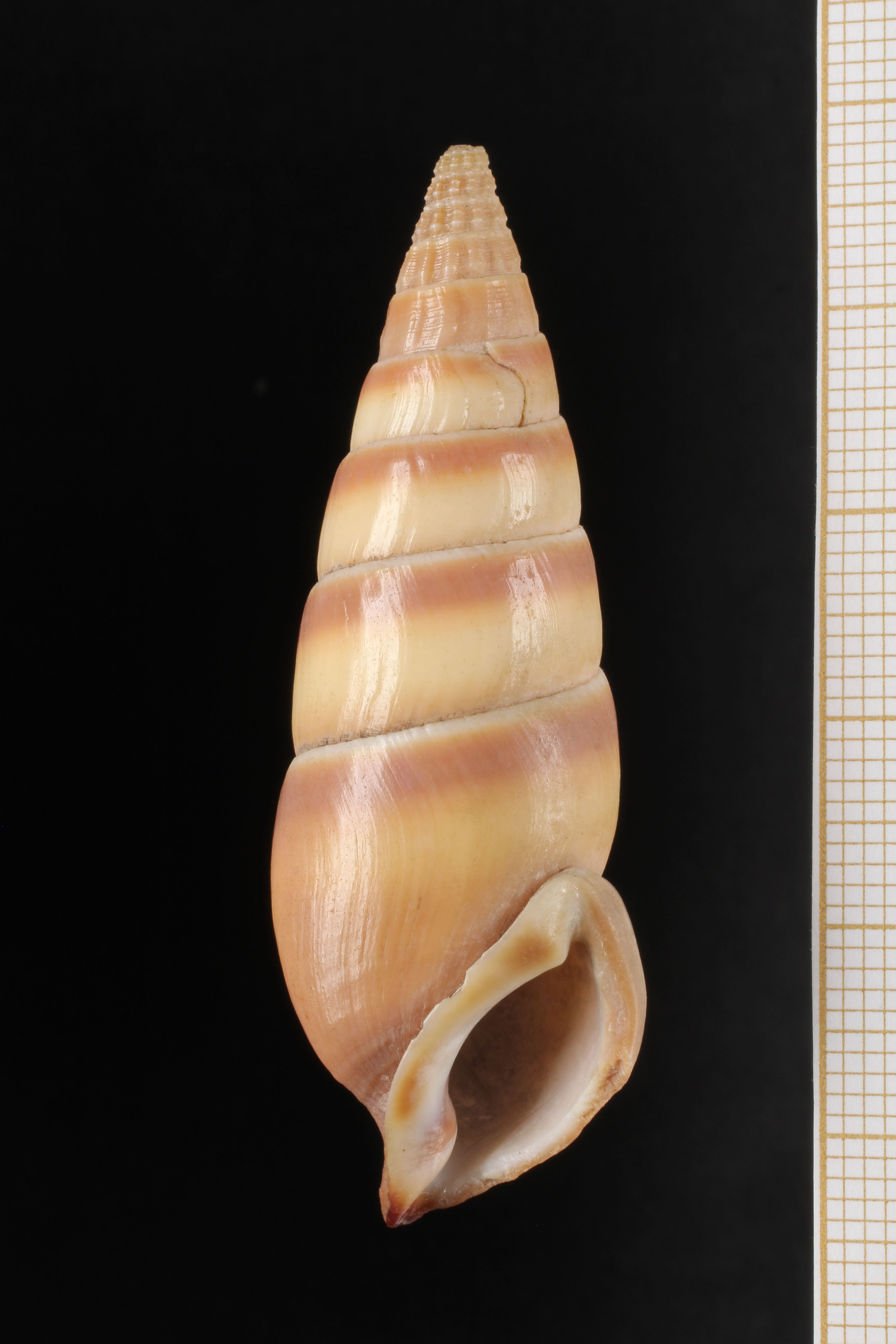
- Image of Cerithium taeniatum

Scientific classification
- Kingdom: Animalia
- Phylum: Mollusca
- Class: Gastropoda
- Subclass: Caenogastropoda
- Order: incertae sedis
- Family: Cerithiidae
- Genus: Clavocerithium
- Species: C. taeniatum

Binomial name
- Clavocerithium taeniatum (Quoy & Gaimard, 1834)

Synonyms
- Cerithium (Vertagus) taeniatum Quoy & Gaimard, 1834; Cerithium taeniatum Quoy & Gaimard, 1834; Clava (Clava) altenai Wissema, 1947; Vertagus implicatus Brancsik, 1895

= Clavocerithium taeniatum =

Species of gastropod

Clavocerithium taeniatum is a species of sea snail, a marine gastropod mollusk in the family Cerithiidae.
