= List of gold nuggets by size =

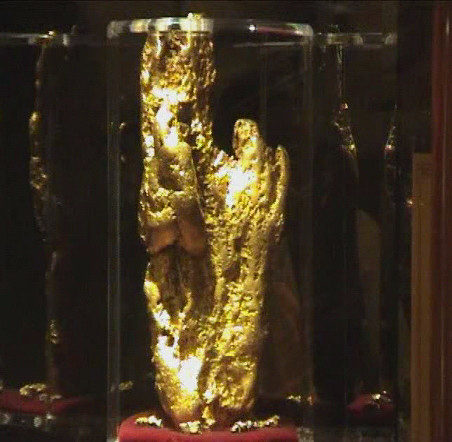
The Hand of Faith is the world's largest gold nugget found by using a metal detector.

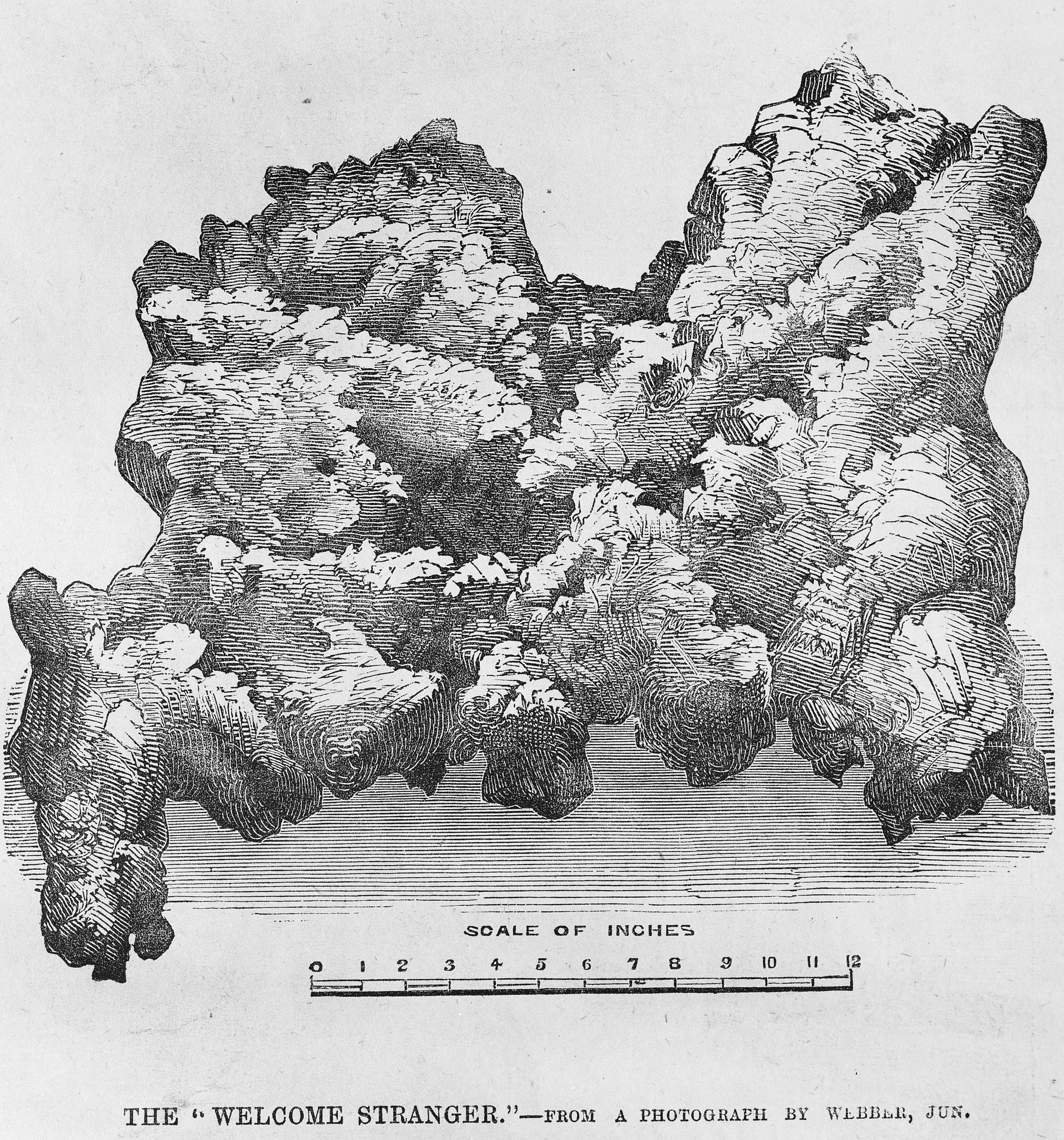
A wood engraving of the Welcome Stranger published in The Illustrated Australian News for Home Reader on 1 March 1869. The scale bar across the bottom represents 12 inches (30 cm).

Gold nuggets of various sizes have been found throughout the world. Historically, the nuggets are melted down and formed into new objects. The Welcome Stranger is the largest alluvial gold nugget ever found, which had a calculated refined weight of 97.14 kilograms (3,123 ozt). Three of the biggest nuggets come from the Brazilian Serra Pelada mine. Most of the largest nuggets were melted down into ingots and so only have historical records of their size and mass.

== Formation ==
A gold nugget is a naturally occurring piece of native gold. Watercourses often concentrate nuggets and finer gold in placers. Nuggets are recovered by placer mining, but they are also found in residual deposits where the gold-bearing veins or lodes are weathered. Nuggets are also found in the tailings piles of previous mining operations, especially those left by gold mining dredges.

Nuggets are gold fragments weathered out of an original lode. They often show signs of abrasive polishing by stream action, and sometimes still contain inclusions of quartz or other lode matrix material. A 2007 study of Australian nuggets ruled out speculative theories of supergene formation via in-situ precipitation, cold welding of smaller particles, or bacterial concentration, since the crystal structures of all nuggets examined proved they were originally formed at high temperature deep underground (i.e., they were of hypogene origin).

Nuggets are usually 20.5 to 22 karat (k) purity, meaning they are 83% to 92% gold by mass. Gold nuggets in Australia are often 23 k or slightly higher, while Alaskan nuggets are usually at the lower end of the spectrum. Purity can be roughly assessed by nugget color: the richer and deeper the orange-yellow, the higher the gold content. Nuggets are also referred to by their fineness, for example "865 fine" means the nugget is 865 parts per thousand in gold by mass. The common impurities are silver and copper. Nuggets high in silver content constitute the alloy electrum.

Two gold nuggets are claimed as the largest in the world: the Welcome Stranger and the Canaã nugget, the latter being the largest surviving natural nugget. Considered by most authorities to be the biggest gold nugget ever found, the Welcome Stranger was found at Moliagul, Victoria, Australia in 1869 by John Deason and Richard Oates. It had a gross weight of over 2,520 troy ounces (78 kg; 173 lb) and returned over 2,284 troy ounces (71.0 kg; 156.6 lb) net. The Welcome Stranger is sometimes confused with the similarly named Welcome Nugget, which was found in June 1858 at Bakery Hill, Ballarat, Australia by the Red Hill Mining Company. The Welcome Nugget weighed 2,218 troy ounces (69.0 kg; 152.1 lb). It was melted down in London in November 1859.

Large nuggets are still being found around the world. On 16 January 2013, a large gold nugget was found near the city of Ballarat in Victoria, Australia by an amateur gold prospector. The Y-shaped nugget weighed slightly more than 5 kilograms (11 lb), measured around 22 cm high by 15 cm wide, and has a market value slightly below 300,000 Australian dollars, though opinions have been expressed that it could be sold for much more due to its rarity. The discovery has cast doubt on the common rumour that Victoria's goldfields were exhausted in the 19th century.

== List of nuggets ==
Name	Discoverer(s)	Location of discovery	Country	Date	Gross weight	Net weight	Notes	References
Welcome Stranger	John Deason and Richard Oates	Moliagul	Australia	1869	2,520 ozt (78 kg; 173 lb)	2,284 ozt (71.0 kg; 156.6 lb)	Found only 3 cm (1.2 in) below the surface, near the base of a tree	
Welcome Nugget	Red Hill Mining Company	Bakery Hill, Ballarat	Australia	June 1858	2,218 ozt (69.0 kg; 152.1 lb)		Melted down in London in November 1859	
Canaã nugget, also known as the Pepita Canaa (Note: The main controversy regarding this nugget is that the excavation reports suggest that the existing nugget was originally part of a nugget weighing 5,291.09 ozt (165 kg; 363 lb) that broke during excavations.)	Serra Pelada Mine	State of Pará	Brazil	September 13, 1983	1,955 ozt (60.8 kg; 134.1 lb)	1,682.5 ozt (52.33 kg; 115.37 lb)	Largest in existence	
Monumental Nugget	W.A. Farish, A. Wood, J. Winstead, F.N.L. Clevering and Harry Warner	Sierra Buttes	United States	August 1869	1,593 ozt (49.5 kg; 109.2 lb)		Sold to R.B. Woodward for $21,637	
	Serra Pelada Mine	State of Pará	Brazil		1,506.2 ozt (46.85 kg; 103.28 lb)		Displayed at the Banco Central Museum in Brazil	
	Serra Pelada Mine	State of Pará	Brazil		1,393.3 ozt (43.34 kg; 95.54 lb)		Displayed at the Banco Central Museum in Brazil	
Lady Hotham		Ballarat, Victoria	Australia	1854	1,170 ozt (36 kg; 80 lb)	17 dwt. of gold	Named after the wife of Governor Charles Hotham	
The Golden Eagle	Jim Larcombe and son	Goldfields-Esperance, Western Australia	Australia	1931	1,135 ozt (35.3 kg; 77.8 lb)		Sold to and melted down by state government	
The Heron		Golden Gully in the Mount Alexander goldfield	Australia	1855	1,008 ozt (31.4 kg; 69.1 lb)		Miners found the nugget on their second day of digging	
Hand of Faith	Kevin Hillier	Kingower, Victoria	Australia	1980	875 ozt (27.2 kg; 60.0 lb)		Found using a metal detector	
Fricot Nugget	William Davis	Sierra Nevada and Northern California goldfields	United States	1865	201 ozt (6.3 kg; 13.8 lb)		Sold for $3,500 to Jules Fricot, who sent it to the 1878 Paris Exposition. On display at the California State Mining and Mineral Museum.	
Dogtown Nugget	Chauncey Wright for Phineas Willard, Ira Weatherbee and Wyatt M. Smith.	Magalia, California	United States	1859	648 ozt (20.2 kg; 44.4 lb)		Sold to the San Francisco Mint for $10,600	

== See also ==
- Bristol Diamonds
- Geode
- List of emeralds by size
- List of pearls by size
- List of sapphires by size
- List of individual gemstones

== Bibliography ==
=== References ===
- Branco, P.M. (2008). Dicionário de Mineralogia e Gemologia São Paulo, Oficina de Textos.
- Butt, C. R. M.; Hough, R. M.; Reddy, S. M.; Verrall, M. (August–September 2006). "Origin and weathering of gold nuggets" (PDF). Geochimica et Cosmochimica Acta. 70 (18). Elsevier: A78. Bibcode:2006GeCAS..70Q..78B. doi:10.1016/j.gca.2006.06.259. ISSN 0016-7037. OCLC 1570626.
- Chambers, William; Chambers, Robert (1893). "The History of Nugget Finding". Chamber's Journal of Popular Literature, Science and Arts. 62 (1). W & R Chambers. OCLC 5097262.
- Cornejo, Carlos; Bartorelli, Andrea (2010). Minerals & Precious Stones of Brazil. Solaris Cultural Publications. ISBN 9788589820080.
- Everist, Richard (2006). The Traveller's Guide to the Goldfields: History & Natural Heritage Trails Through Central & Western Victoria. BestShot. ISBN 9780975602331.
- Hill, Mary (2002). Gold: The California Story. University of California Press. ISBN 9780520236806.
- Hough, R. M.; Butt, C. R. M.; Reddy, S. M.; Verrall, M. (2007). "Gold nuggets: supergene or hypogene?". Australian Journal of Earth Sciences. 54 (7). Taylor & Francis on behalf of the Geological Society of Australia: 959–964. Bibcode:2007AuJES..54..959H. doi:10.1080/08120090701488289. ISSN 0812-0099. OCLC 45381897.
- International California Mining Journal (1996). "Finds". International California Mining Journal. 5. ISSN 1526-405X.
- Kenny, Shannon L.; Venable, Shannon L. (2011). Gold: A Cultural Encyclopedia. ABC-CLIO. ISBN 9780313384301.
- Maclaren, James Malcolm (1908). Gold: Its Geological Occurrence and Geographical Distribution. Mining Journal.
- McKowen, Ken; McKowen, Dahlynn (2006). Best of California's Missions, Mansions, and Museums: A Behind-the-Scenes Guide to the Golden State's Historic and Cultural Treasures. Wilderness Press. ISBN 9780899973982.
- Nolan, Pat (January 17, 2013). "Gold nugget found near Ballarat". The Courier.
- phys.org (October 16, 2007). "Gold nuggets reveal their inner secrets". phys.org.
- Richards, Jim (2016). Gold Rush. Fremantle Press. ISBN 9781925164022.
- Special Broadcasting Service (2019). "Famous Australian Nuggets". Special Broadcasting Service.
- Zorach, Rebecca; Phillips, Michael W. (2016). Gold: Nature and Culture. Reaktion Books. ISBN 9781780236131.
