= Canadian Gully diggings =

The Canadian Gully diggings were prominent in Ballarat, Victoria, during the first years of the Victorian gold rush. It is notable for the discovery of the Canadian, which was the largest recorded gold nugget when it was discovered in 1853. The diggings were located within where the southern boundary of Sovereign Hill is now. Beneath it was the Canadian Lead (a deep lead (/liːd/) is an auriferous buried riverbed), which gives its name to the Ballarat suburb of Canadian.

Gold was first found on Canadian Gully's surface on 20 September 1851, but David Ham's party found the first nugget there in March 1852. A small gold rush at the gully occurred in September 1852. In January 1853, the separate discoveries of three nuggets which each weighed over 1,000 ounces (28 kg), including the Canadian, led to an even greater gold rush which lasted for several years. Its claims were known to be rich in gold. By 1855, however, the area was being reworked by Chinese miners. While Canadian Gully's gold rush was even greater than the original Ballarat gold rush at Golden Point, its discoveries were later eclipsed by even larger nuggets such as the Welcome Stranger.

== 1851–1852 ==
The Victorian gold rush occurred during the 1850s and 1860s. The Ballarat goldfields attracted large numbers of diggers who hoped to become wealthy, including hundreds of Canadian immigrants. Canadians therefore played notable roles in the history of Ballarat and, more broadly, Victoria. For example, the designer of the Eureka Flag was Canadian-born Charles Ross. Ballarat's Canadian Gully was reputedly named for a successful Canadian gold digger known as Canadian Swift. It was the first discovered in a series of gullies "emerging [...] like the bones of a trout" from the White Horse Ranges, a seven-mile (11 km) line of quartz hills extending south from Ballarat to Buninyong.

Coarse gold was first found on Canadian Gully's surface on 20 September 1851. However, thousands of diggers began to leave the Ballarat goldfields soon after, in search of easier diggings—the deeper alluvium was wet, making it hard to sink through—and lower license costs. In October 1851, there were three thousand diggers in Ballarat. But, in February 1852, only 323 miner's licenses were issued in Ballarat, compared to the 12,055 issued at Mount Alexander. In March 1852, David Ham and his party sunk the first hole and found the first gold nugget at Canadian Gully. In May, the commissioner reported two plentiful new diggings in Ballarat with "excellent average returns": Eureka and Canadian Gully. However, rainfall that month filled up the holes, driving the diggers to drier ground at the heads of the gullies. Work on Canadian Gully resumed in July.

During the Victorian gold rush, Ballarat was known for its deep leads (/liːds/), which were buried riverbeds containing alluvial and eluvial gold. The first deep leads were discovered beneath Eureka and Canadian Gully. The miners began to follow the path of the two leads in search of gold, but the surface of Canadian Gully also provided profitable returns. (Note: At the end of 1852, one party prospected the east side of the White Horse Ranges. To the north of Canadian Gully, they found the Red Hill lead. The Canadian Lead ran south of where Canadian Creek crosses Buninyong Road, "east-west" to Canadian Gully. As it continued south, passing by where the open-air museum Sovereign Hill is now, it divided into more leads which that party found in late 1852: the Red Streak, Prince Regent's Lead, Sailor's Gully, Scotchman's Lead and New Chum. They were all tributaries of One Eye Gully, but the Canadian became a metonym for the whole area. Bate (1978, p. 33) includes a map of the deep leads in the "Canadian Line".) In September, one party of diggers found three gold nuggets within 6 inches (15 cm) of the surface, weighing 102 ounces (2.9 kg), 19 ounces (540 g) and 18 ounces (510 g). This caused a small gold rush in Canadian Gully; within two days, 70 tents had been pitched there. At first, every digger was successful. As a result of the diggings at Canadian Gully and Eureka, Ballarat's population rose during August and September 1852. However, a severe drought in November and December drove many diggers away from the gullies of Ballarat.

== Discoveries of January 1853 ==
=== The discoverers ===
The cousins John and Daniel Evans were experienced coal miners from Oldham, England, who came to Australia to join the Victorian gold rush. Daniel was a forty-five-year-old shaft sinker. They had set out from Liverpool aboard the Lady Head on 2 June 1852. At the diggings of Ovens, Victoria, the Evans cousins befriended John Lees. Lees was also from Oldham. Born in Glodwick, part of Oldham, in 1822, he arrived in Melbourne in mid-1852, leaving the town's struggling cotton industry in search of gold. In Melbourne, their party (hereafter referred to as "the first party") was joined by William Poulton Green. A former railway clerk at Wolverhampton, Green had recently arrived on the Great Britain's maiden voyage but was so far unsuccessful in Australia.

On 17 November 1852, the first party took a steamboat to Geelong before walking the 65 miles (105 km) to Ballarat—Daniel Evans later recalled, "for two days we lived only on what we shot"—where they arrived on 20 November. In December, they worked abandoned holes up to 50 feet (15 m) deep until Daniel Evans found a good spot at Canadian Gully.

Another party of four (hereafter referred to as "the second party")—the brothers-in-law William John Gough, John Bristow and John Sully, and Gough's 18-year-old son Thomas George Gough—had been mining together since February 1852. Each brother-in-law was married to one of the Collings sisters of Aylesbury. Gough left for Australia in March 1852 and arrived in August. Bristow was a publican in Buckingham and Bicester who, amid financial struggles, left for Australia with his wife, Jane, and their family in 1848. Sully already lived in Australia; in 1850, he had married Emma Collings in Melbourne.

The second party had agreed on a method of dividing the expenses and earnings of their mining between themselves. They had used this method before. For example, in December, Bristow and Sully received 20 ounces (570 g) of gold each, while 80 ounces (2,300 g) overall went to the Goughs, who provided their tools and stores. When William Gough became ill in the first week of January 1853 and had to go to Geelong, he expected he and his son to receive two-thirds of the gold, as they had before.

=== The discoveries ===
The second party found their first large nugget at Canadian Gully on 20 January. Weighing 1,117 ounces (31.7 kg), it became known as the Sarah Sands. (Note: It is unclear how this nugget became known under this name, as it was instead the Canadian which sailed abroad the Sarah Sands. It is likely that the two nuggets had been confused at the time. This has caused confusion in later reports, and the three nuggets have been erroneously reported as having been found in a single discovery.) They found another nugget on 22 January, which weighed 1,012 ounces (28.7 kg). The second party did not inform the public of their discoveries until three weeks had passed. Instead, they worked for two more weeks. They were able to find 100 ounces (2.8 kg) of additional gold before they sold the claim for 80 guineas (£84).

The first party started working on their spot at Canadian Gully. The Evans cousins, who had experience as coal miners, sunk the first shaft, while Green and Lees hauled and carried. After several days and nights of work, they reached 50 feet (15 m) down and obtained 8–9 pounds (3.6–4.1 kg) of gold before selling their claim to the shaft.

The first party then started a second shaft. It proved difficult because the water rose at 20 feet (6.1 m), but they were able to bail it out. When they hit bedrock at around 66 feet (20 m), they began a small horizontal tunnel and found small gold nuggets. About 5 p.m. on 31 January 1853, John Evans found the large nugget now known as the Canadian. He was careful to conceal the find from other diggers until he got back to the tent. Escorted by three policeman, the Evans cousins were taken to the commissioners' tent. The next morning, they washed and weighed the nugget. Shaped "like a leg of mutton" and about 18 inches (46 cm) long, the nugget weighed 1,619 ounces (45.9 kg) and contained 1,319 ounces (37.4 kg) of gold. Lees and Green remained at their spot to guard it. On the Evans' instructions, they sold the claim for £300.

=== Aftermath ===
The Canadian's discovery was the first to be announced to the public. The Geelong Advertiser and Intelligencer first reported the news on 3 February with the headline: "Largest Mass of Gold in the World!!". Since it was the largest recorded gold nugget up to that point, the Canadian's discovery was relayed by newspapers across Australia. The press coverage only intensified with the 8 February announcement of the two nuggets found by the second party. The Advertiser's report later spread to India and then the United Kingdom, where it was widely reproduced.

The Canadian was transported to Melbourne by an armed escort, where it was viewed by Lieutenant Governor Charles La Trobe and his wife, the Bishop of Melbourne, government dignitaries, and merchants. On 10 February 1854, the Canadian's owners left with it and their other winnings on the screw steamer Sarah Sands. After a long voyage, they arrived at Plymouth and, in early June, left the Canadian at the Bullion Office of the Bank of England. The gold nugget soon went on public display. One of the first exhibits was held at Wyld's Great Globe in July 1853, hosted by Green. In August 1853, the first party was granted an audience with Queen Victoria and Prince Albert to present the Canadian, and also privately displayed it to various noblemen. They sold the Canadian to the Bank of England in July 1854 for £5,532, and it was ultimately melted down. In August 1854, Daniel Evans displayed a model of the nugget at the Lyceum exhibition in Manchester.

The second party displayed the two nuggets they had discovered at the Geelong Masonic Hall on 16 February 1853, raising £24 for the Geelong Infirmary. Bristow and Sully then kept it in a Geelong bank, refusing to give two-thirds of the proceeds to the Goughs as per their agreement. In response, the Goughs obtained an injunction, beginning what became known as the Geelong Nuggets case. The defendants argued that Bristow had sunk half of the discovery shaft, that William Gough had let his license expire on 31 December, and that their partnership had ended. In early April, the Supreme Court ordered for new affidavits, but it is unclear if the affidavits were submitted or if the matter was privately settled. The two nuggets were transported to London, where they were melted down, with the second party receiving under £9,000.

=== Later lives of the discoverers ===
William Poulton Green got married and ran a hotel in Torquay, England. He later moved to Congleton and died in 1891.

John Lees returned to Glodwick and became a local celebrity. Lees used his share of the profits to build a group of houses called the Ballarat Buildings in Glodwick. The street on which the Ballarat Buildings were built was later named Nugget Street in honour of his gold prospecting achievements. Lees settled down in Glodwick. In 1854, he got married and built another row of houses on Glodwick Lane. Lees grew bored with his life in England, and so, in August 1856, he returned to the Victorian goldfields. However, his second effort was plagued with difficulty and disappointment and yielded little success. He came back to England in July 1863, and died in 1899.

Lees' eldest son, John, became the accountant and treasurer of the Metropolitan Borough of Oldham. His second son, Charles, was born in the Ballarat Buildings in 1864. He was a scientist who got some of his papers published in Philosophical Magazine. The Lees family moved to Sussex after Charles became a professor of physics at Imperial College London. John Lees' third son, Edward, became the general manager of the Manchester and County Bank. In the 1970s, Lees' great-grandson David Lees found a collection of letters which John Lees had written on the goldfields. In 1976, he auctioned them off at Sotheby's in London. They were bought by the State Library Victoria (SLV) and became part of the SLV's Australian Manuscripts Collection. David Lees used the proceeds to buy Queen, a business which sells hypoallergenic products.

When the second party found the nuggets, John Bristow wrote to his creditors that he would be able to pay off his considerable debt in Buckingham. Forty-three-year-old William John Gough stayed in Geelong. He ran a store and later kept Gough's Eureka Hotel; he also directed mining companies. Gough died in 1876, leaving an estate of just under £1,000. His son Thomas George Gough went from working as a barman in his father's hotel to becoming a company secretary and director, as well as a provider of materials such as steam boiler equipment. John Sully purchased the Diggers Rest Hotel near Sunbury, Victoria, which he kept until he died in 1883, aged 67, leaving an estate worth £5,203 to his wife and daughter.

== 1853–1855 ==
On 11 February 1853, the Advertiser observed that the Canadian's discovery "has created an amount of excitement not equalled [sic] even by the first discovery of glorious Golden Point, at Ballarat".

== Legacy ==
The Canadian Lead was located within where the southern boundary of the open-air museum Sovereign Hill now is.

One of the type of rooms available at the Sovereign Hill Hotel is the Canadian Gully Family Room.

== Sources ==
- Bate, Weston (1978). Lucky City: The First Generation at Ballarat: 1851–1901. Carlton: Melbourne University Press. ISBN 9780522841572.
- "Canadian". Victorian Places. Monash University; University of Queensland.
- Eckersley, Dawn (15 October 2008). "Family tree reveals a historic nugget". Oldham Evening Chronicle.
- "Immigration History from Canada to Victoria". Origins. Museums Victoria.
- "Manuscripts: A letter from the Victorian Gold Fields by John Lees, 1852". The La Trobe Journal (21). State Library of Victoria: 15–18. April 1978.
- McCarthy, Peter (October 2022). "The 1853 Canadian Gully nuggets, Ballarat, Victoria" (PDF). Journal of Australasian Mining History. 20: 73–85.
- Smyth, Robert Brough (1869). The Gold Fields and Mineral Districts of Victoria, With Notes on the Modes of Occurrence of Gold and Other Metals and Minerals. Melbourne: John Ferres.
