= Joan Esterle =

America-Australian geologist

Joan S. Esterle is an American-Australian geologist who is an emeritus professor at the School of the Environment from University of Queensland and the former chair of its Coal Geoscience Program.

== Biography ==
Esterle graduated in geology from the University of Kentucky, USA in 1990, then joined the University of Canterbury in New Zealand as a post-doctoral fellow. She started working with CSIRO in 1992 as a junior scientist in the Geomechanics Division, then with the GeoGAS-Runge Group in Brisbane, Australia. In 2004, she joined the faculty at the University of Queensland.

Esterle is known for her research on Queensland geology, particularly on the properties of coal. She has researched extensively on the bio-influence in coal characterization and the geomorphological evolution of basins and geohazards assessment in mines. Esterle has developed 3D models to analyse the geological history of coal, to predict geohazards, and to evaluate gas resources and geosequestration. She has been working with industry partners such as VALE, conducting research through the Australian Coal Research Program, the Australian National Low Emissions Coal Research, and the University of Queensland Centre for Coal Seam Gas. She is author of more than 85 peer-reviewed publications, including conference papers, journal articles, and at least one book chapter. She is member of the Bowen Basin Geologist's Group and the Geological Society of Australia Coal Geology Group. She was nominated for the Leichhardt Award in 2015 and won the Dorothy Hill Medal from the Queensland Division of the Geological Society of Australia in 2016. In 2019, she was the keynote speaker at the International Conference and Exhibition on Energy and Environment.

== Selected works ==
- Esterle, Joan; O'brien, Graham; Thornton, Darren; Kanchibotla, Sarma; Edwards, Darren (1 September 1999). "Impact of coal mass structure on fragmentation during mining and processing". Mineral Resources Engineering. 08 (3): 285–299. doi:10.1142/S0950609899000281. ISSN 0950-6098.
- Hamilton, Stephanie K.; Golding, Suzanne D.; Esterle, Joan S.; Baublys, Kim A.; Ruyobya, Brycson B. (February 2020). "Controls on Gas Domains and Production Behaviour in A High-Rank CSG Reservoir: Insights from Molecular and Isotopic Chemistry of Co-Produced Waters and Gases from the Bowen Basin, Australia". Geosciences. 10 (2): 74. Bibcode:2020Geosc..10...74H. doi:10.3390/geosciences10020074.
- Sun, Beilei; Esterle, Joan S.; Dawson, Grant K. W.; Rodrigues, Sandra; Lord, Rhiannon; Golding, Sue D.; Feng, Yuexing; Zeng, Fangui (1 May 2020). "Evidence for an Early-Middle Jurassic fluid event constrained by Sm–Nd, Sr isotopes, rare earth elements and yttrium in the Bowen Basin, Australia". International Journal of Coal Geology. 224 103478. Bibcode:2020IJCG..22403478S. doi:10.1016/j.coal.2020.103478. ISSN 0166-5162. S2CID 216509254.
- Davis, Brooke A.; Rodrigues, Sandra; Esterle, Joan S.; Rintoul, Llew; Duxbury, Alex J.; Golding, Sue D. (1 October 2020). "In situ techniques for classifying apatite in coal". International Journal of Coal Geology. 230 103572. Bibcode:2020IJCG..23003572D. doi:10.1016/j.coal.2020.103572. ISSN 0166-5162. S2CID 225507497.
- Davis, Brooke A.; Rodrigues, Sandra; Esterle, Joan S.; Nguyen, Ai D.; Duxbury, Alexander J.; Golding, Suzanne D. (15 March 2021). "Geochemistry of apatite in Late Permian coals, Bowen Basin, Australia". International Journal of Coal Geology. 237 103708. Bibcode:2021IJCG..23703708D. doi:10.1016/j.coal.2021.103708. ISSN 0166-5162. S2CID 233915280.
- Cooling, J. J.; Crowley, J. L.; McKellar, J. L.; Esterle, J. S.; Nicoll, R. S.; Bianchi, V. (3 April 2021). "Stratigraphic constraints on the Lower Cretaceous Orallo Formation, southeastern Queensland: U–Pb dating of bentonite and palynostratigraphy of associated strata". Australian Journal of Earth Sciences. 68 (3): 343–354. Bibcode:2021AuJES..68..343C. doi:10.1080/08120099.2020.1781690. ISSN 0812-0099. S2CID 225642221.
