= Gold nugget =

Piece of gold

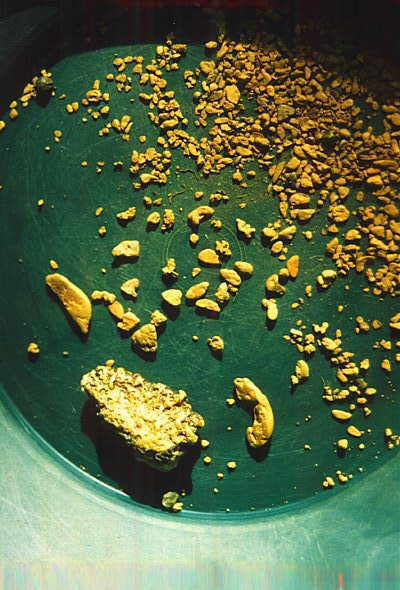
Alaskan gold grains and nuggets of various sizes

A gold nugget is a naturally occurring piece of native gold. Watercourses often concentrate nuggets and finer gold in placers. Nuggets are recovered by placer mining, but they are also found in residual deposits where the gold-bearing veins or lodes are weathered. Nuggets are also found in the tailings piles of previous mining operations, especially those left by gold mining dredges.

== Formation ==
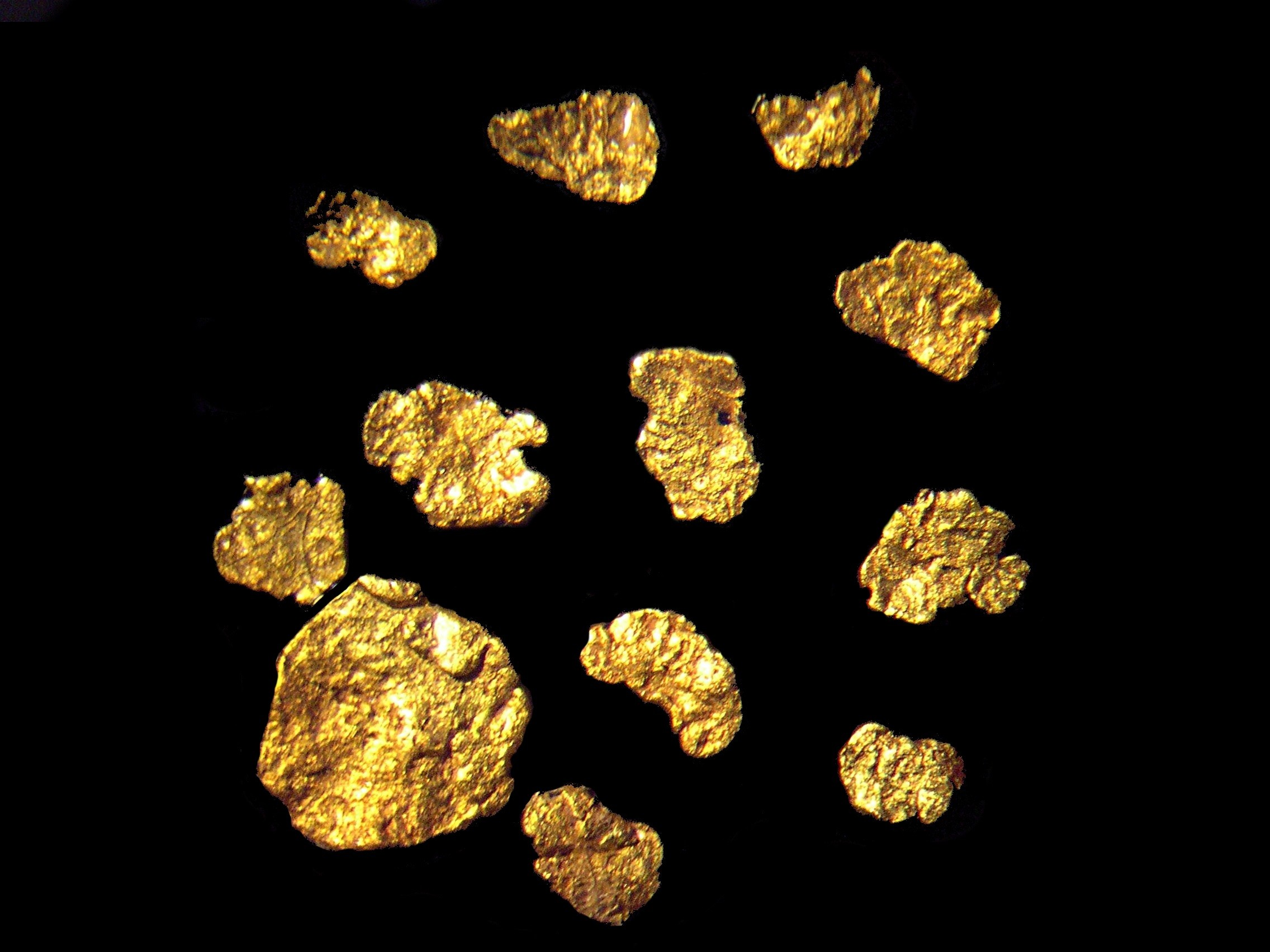
Native gold flakes viewed under a microscope. Found in Lavaudieu, Haute-Loire, France. (Scale 10mm)

Nuggets are gold fragments weathered out of an original lode. They often show signs of abrasive polishing by stream action, and sometimes still contain inclusions of quartz or other lode matrix material. A 2007 study on Australian nuggets ruled out speculative theories of supergene formation via in-situ precipitation, cold welding of smaller particles, or bacterial concentration, since crystal structures of all of the nuggets examined proved they were originally formed at high temperature deep underground (i.e., they were of hypogene origin).

Other precious metals such as platinum form nuggets in the same way. A later study of native gold from Arizona, based on lead isotopes indicates that a significant part of the mass in alluvial gold nuggets in this area formed within the placer environment.

== Composition ==
Nuggets are usually 20K to 22K purity (83% to 92% by mass). Gold nuggets in Australia often are 23K or slightly higher, while Alaskan nuggets are usually at the lower end of the spectrum. Purity can be roughly assessed by the nugget color, the richer and deeper the orange-yellow the higher the gold content. Nuggets are also referred to by their fineness, for example "865 fine" means the nugget is 865 parts per thousand in gold by mass. The common impurities are silver and copper. Nuggets high in silver content constitute the alloy electrum. The chemical composition of supergene gold nuggets can reveal the characteristics of the primary ore.

== Largest nuggets ==
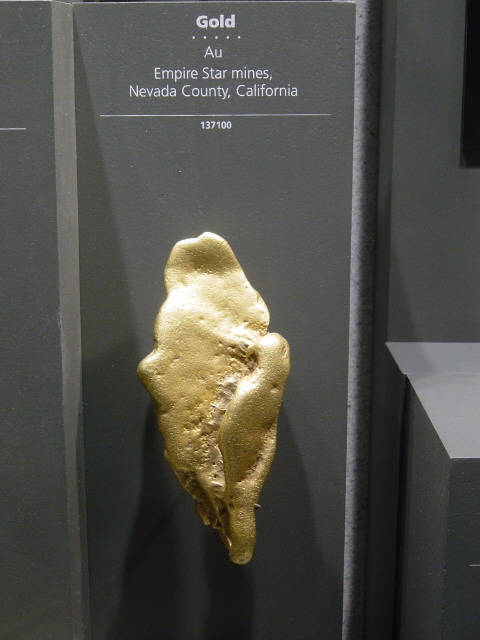
A large gold nugget from Nevada County, California, on display at the National Museum of Natural History in Washington, D.C.. 15 cm long.

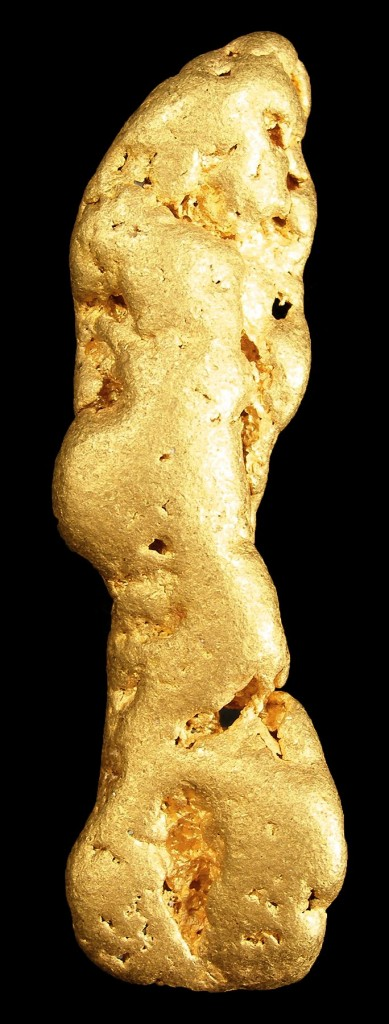
A large gold nugget from the Kuskokwim Mountains of central Alaska. 6.6 x 2.0 x 1.1 cm. Weight: 77 grams

Two gold nuggets are claimed as the largest in the world: the Welcome Stranger and the Canaã nugget, the latter being the largest surviving natural nugget. Considered by most authorities to be the biggest gold nugget ever found, the Welcome Stranger was found at Moliagul, Victoria, Australia in 1869 by John Deason and Richard Oates. It weighed gross, over 2,520 troy ounces (78 kg; 173 lb) and returned over 2,284 troy ounces (71.0 kg; 156.6 lb) net. The Welcome Stranger is sometimes confused with the similarly named Welcome Nugget, which was found in June 1858 at Bakery Hill, Ballarat, Australia by the Red Hill Mining Company. The Welcome weighed 2,218 troy ounces (69.0 kg; 152.1 lb). It was melted down in London in November 1859.

The Canaã nugget, also known as the Pepita Canaa, was found on September 13, 1983, by miners at the Serra Pelada Mine in the State of Para, Brazil. Weighing 1,955 troy ounces (60.8 kg; 134.1 lb) gross, and containing 1,682.5 troy ounces (52.33 kg; 115.37 lb) of gold, it is among the largest gold nuggets ever found, and is, today, the largest in existence. The main controversy regarding this nugget is that the excavation reports suggest that the existing nugget was originally part of a nugget weighing 5,291.09 troy ounces (165 kg; 363 lb) that broke during excavations. The Canaã nugget is displayed at the Banco Central Museum in Brazil along with the second and third largest nuggets remaining in existence, weighing respectively 1,506.2 troy ounces (46.85 kg; 103.28 lb) and 1,393.3 troy ounces (43.34 kg; 95.54 lb), which were also found at the Serra Pelada region.

The largest gold nugget found using a metal detector is the Hand of Faith, weighing 875 troy ounces (27.2 kg; 60.0 lb), found in Kingower, Victoria, Australia in 1980.

Historic large specimens include the crystalline "Fricot Nugget", weighing 201 troy ounces (6.3 kg; 13.8 lb) – the largest one found during the California Gold Rush. It is on display at the California State Mining and Mineral Museum.

The largest gold nugget ever found in California was the "Monumental Nugget" which weighed 1,593 troy ounces (49.5 kg; 109.2 lb). It was found in August 1869 in Sierra Buttes by five partners – W.A. Farish, A. Wood, J. Winstead, F.N.L. Clevering and Harry Warner.

The Victoria, Australia gold rush of the early 1850s produced a number of large nuggets. They include the Welcome Nugget which weighed 68.98 kilograms (152.1 lb) which is considered to be the second largest gold nugget ever found. Another find, the Lady Hotham, which weighed 98.5 pounds (44.7 kg), was found by a group of nine miners on September 8, 1854, in Canadian Gully, Ballarat at a depth of 135 feet (41.2 m). The Lady Hotham was named after the wife of the Governor, Sir Charles Hotham who happened to be visiting the area when the nugget was found. Eighteen months earlier, in January and early February 1853, three other large nuggets weighing 134 pounds (61 kg), 93.125 pounds (42.241 kg), and 83.5 pounds (37.9 kg) were also found in Canadian Gully at a depth of 55 to 60 feet (17 to 18 m). Another nugget, the Heron, was found in 1855 in Golden Gully in the Mount Alexander goldfield. It weighed 1,008 troy ounces (31.4 kg; 69.1 lb) and was found by a group of inexperienced miners who had received a supposedly empty claim. The miners found the nugget on their second day of digging; the nugget was named after one of the gold commissioners, a Mr. Heron.

On 16 January 2013, a large gold nugget was found near the city of Ballarat in Victoria, Australia by an amateur gold prospector. The Y-shaped nugget weighed slightly more than 5 kilograms (11 lb), measured around 22 cm high by 15 cm wide, and has a market value slightly below 300,000 Australian dollars, though opinions have been expressed that it could be sold for much more due to its rarity. The discovery has cast doubt on the common rumour that Victoria's goldfields were exhausted in the 19th century.

== See also ==
- Gold mining
- Gold prospecting
- Gold rush
- Beyers-Holtermann Specimen, the largest specimen of native gold ever found. Essentially reef gold, thus with quartz and, therefore, not a nugget (which is typically alluvial gold). It contained approx. 3,000 troy oz (93.3 kg) of gold, thus 25% more gold than the largest nugget.
- Latrobe nugget
- Nugget (coin)
- Rocker box
