= Red Hill Mine =

Mine in Victoria, Australia

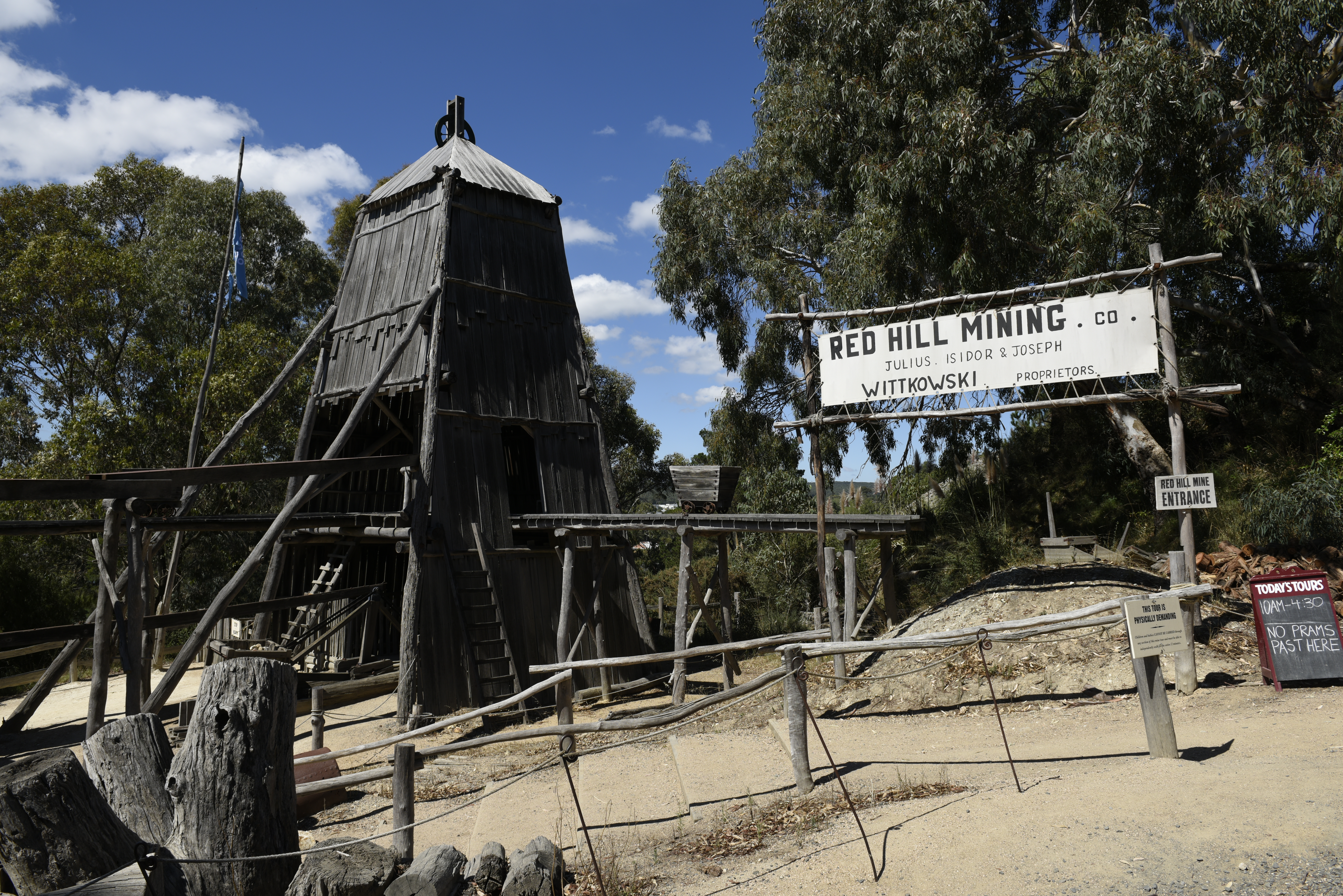
Entrance to the Red Hill Mine

The Red Hill Mine at Sovereign Hill is a re-creation of a former mine of the same name at Bakery Hill, Ballarat. The 69 kg Welcome Nugget was found at the original Red Hill Mine in 1858. The Sovereign Hill re-creation features tours that are self-guided, led by a voice that trails the visitor through the mine. It is 76 steps down and roughly 100 steps across.

== History ==
The second-largest gold nugget in the world was found in Ballarat at the original Red Hill Mine in 1858. During Sovereign Hill's construction in the mid-1970s high priority was given to re-creating all aspects of life in Ballarat including representation of deep lead alluvial mining. One of the first shafts dug at Sovereign Hill was a scaled-down representation of the deep lead shaft in which the Welcome Nugget had been found, becoming the present Red Hill Mine.
