= Alan Knox Denmead =

Australian geologist

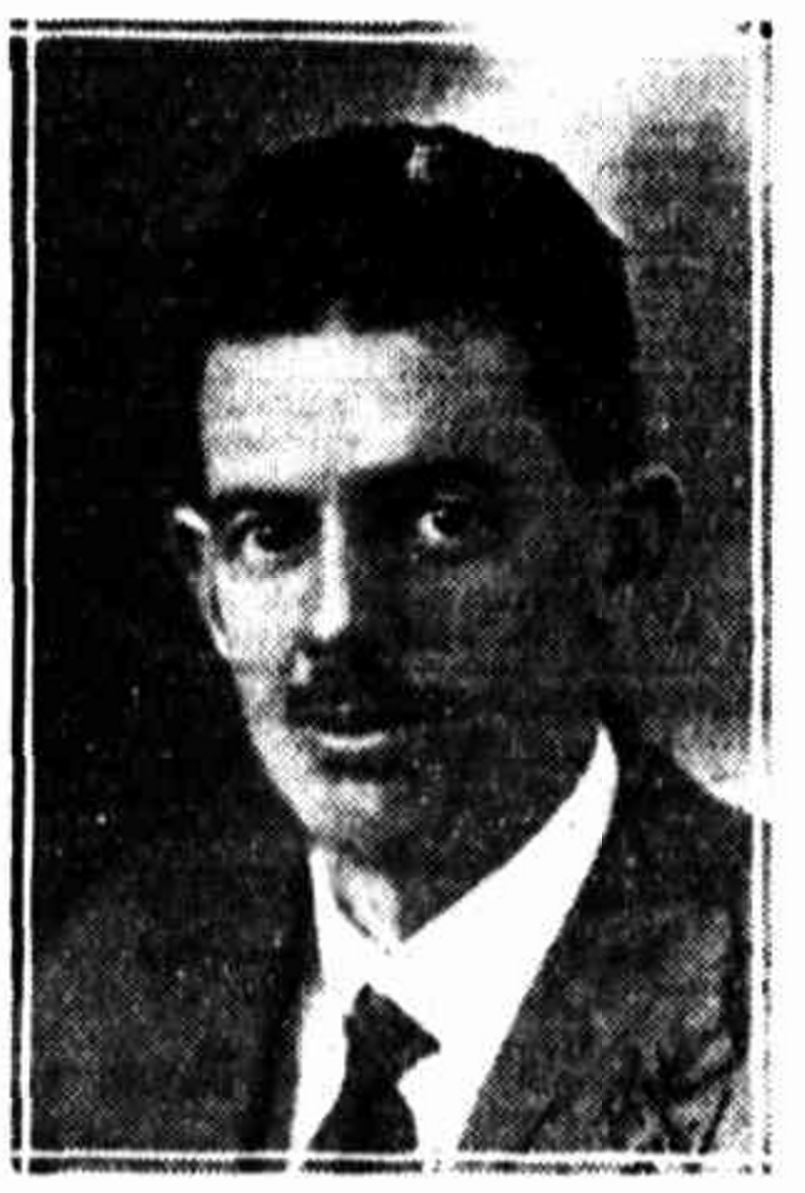
Alan Knox Denmead, 1932

Alan Knox Denmead (1902–1994) was an Australian geologist, and Chief Government Geologist for Queensland from 1956–1967.

== Early life ==
Alan Knox Denmead was born in Melbourne, Victoria on 5 November 1902. His family moved to Brisbane, Queensland in 1917. Denmead attended the Anglican Church Grammar School in Brisbane. He enrolled at the University of Queensland in 1921, graduating with his B.Sc. in 1926 followed by his M.Sc in 1928. His Masters thesis was the study of Brisbane metamorphic rocks. Denmead married fellow University of Queensland graduate and geologist, Noela Harris in 1932.

== Career ==
Denmead joined the Queensland Geological Survey in 1927 and would remain with them for the next 40 years. He was appointed District Geologist to Charters Towers in 1946, Assistant Chief Geologist in 1950, and became Chief Government Geologist from 1956–1967 when he retired. Denmead and his wife resided in Cracow, Queensland during 1932, during the gold boom of that period. Denmead was progressive in pushing for an extensive program of geological mapping and coal resource evaluation. With support from the Commonwealth Department of Mineral Resources, Geology and Geophysics, exploration of the Bowen Basin coal reserves was undertaken, and would fuel the state's mining industry for decades to come. In addition to the growth in the coal export industry, bauxite mining and alumina refining also commenced, as well as research into oil and gas production.

Denmead published over 100 articles in the Queensland Government Mining Journal. In 1960, he and long-time friend, Professor Dorothy Hill of the University of Queensland published the Geology of Queensland, a volume which would be the standard for mineral and petroleum research over the next 20 years.

Denmead was active in the Geological Society of Australia, from its formation in the early 1950s. He served as Chairman of the Queensland division and President of the national body in 1962–1963. He was a member of the Royal Society of Queensland and Australasian Institute of Mining and Metallurgy.

== Legacy ==
Denmead died on 30 August 1994. He was survived by his wife and daughters.

The Queensland division of the Geological Society of Australia established an annual A.K. Denmead lecture in his honour for his services to geology in Queensland.

== List of works ==
- Denmead, A. K. (Alan Knox); Geological Survey of Queensland (1955), The West Moreton (Ipswich) coalfield, Govt. Printer
- Hill, Dorothy; Hill, Dorothy; Denmead, A. K. (Alan Knox); Geological Society of Australia (1960), The Geology of Queensland, Melbourne University Press on behalf of the Geological Society of Australia
