= Blanche Barkly =

The Blanche Barkly was a gold nugget found in Kingower, Victoria, named for the daughter of the governor of the colony at the time. Weighing 1,743 ounces (49.4 kg), it was discovered on August 27, 1857, at a depth of 13 feet (4.0 m) by Samuel & Charles Napier and Robert & James Ambrose. It was, at the time, the largest gold nugget ever discovered and remains the third-largest discovered. The nugget measured 2 ft 4 in (71 cm) long, 10 in (25 cm) wide and varied from 1 to 2 in (2.5 to 5.1 cm) in thickness and was valued at between £8,000 and £10,000 at the time of its discovery. Sam Napier reported that it was taken to England and displayed at The Crystal Palace, that the British Museum made a replica, and that it was ultimately bought by the Bank of England for around £12,000 (equivalent to £1,448,420 in 2025) and melted down to make around 10000 sovereigns.

== See also ==
- List of gold nuggets by size
