= Hand of Faith =

Australian gold nugget found in 1980

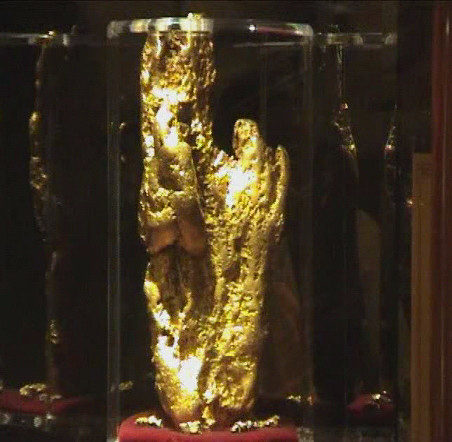
The Hand of Faith is the world's largest gold nugget found by using a metal detector.

The Hand of Faith is a very large gold nugget that was found by Kevin Hillier using a metal detector near Kingower, Victoria, Australia, on 26 September 1980. Weighing 875 troy ounces (ozt; 27.21 kg, or 72 troy pounds and 11 troy ounces), the gold nugget was only 12 inches (30 cm) below the surface, resting in a vertical position. The announcement of the discovery occurred at a press conference, attended by Premier of Victoria Dick Hamer, in Melbourne on 8 October 1980. Kovac's Gems & Minerals was appointed as the agent for the sale of the huge nugget by Hillier. It was sold to the Golden Nugget Casino chain for over a million dollars.

The Hand of Faith is currently on public display at the Golden Nugget Las Vegas in the United States. Replicas of the nugget are on display at a number of Golden Nugget casinos, including the Golden Nugget Laughlin and the Golden Nugget Atlantic City.

It was initially incorrectly stated as weighing only 720 ozt, but after correction, the new calculation was 874.82 ozt. This explains why some publications continue to give an incorrect weight. It is still regarded as the largest modern nugget found by a metal detector. Its dimensions are 47 cm × 20 cm × 9 cm (18.5 in x 7.9 in x 3.5 in). The sale price was over US$1 million.

The nugget is the second largest nugget found in Australia since the 1930s. There were numerous nuggets found during the Victorian gold rush era, commencing in the 1850s, that were far larger.

== See also ==
- List of gold nuggets by size
