= Latrobe nugget =

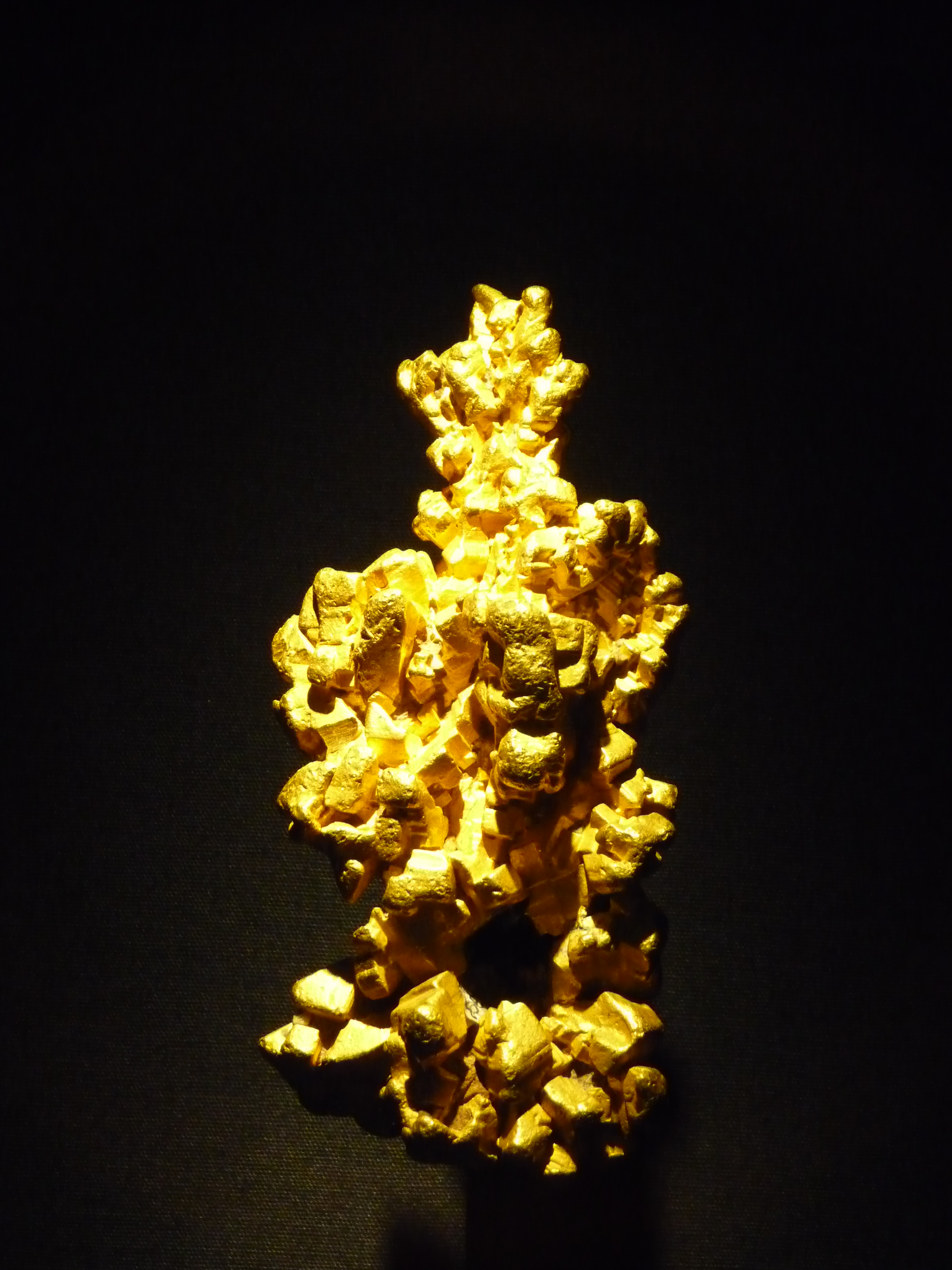
The Latrobe gold nugget, on display in The Vault, Natural History Museum, London.

The Latrobe nugget is one of the largest clusters of cubic gold crystals known in the world and is kept at the Natural History Museum in London. The nugget weighs 717 grams. It was found at Mount McIvor, Victoria, Australia. It was raised on 1 May 1853 in the presence of Charles La Trobe, Governor of Victoria, and was named in his honour.

Naturally all gold has a crystalline structure, yet nuggets showing this structure are very uncommon. They require specific conditions to form, in particular space in which to grow. Crystals of gold are found in cavities in softer minerals such as iron oxides, where they have pushed aside the enclosing material as they grew. Gold crystallises in the cubic system, and perhaps the most common variety is the eight-sided octahedron, of which the Latrobe Nugget is a good example.

== See also ==
- Gold nugget
