= Edwin Sherbon Hills =

Australian geologist

Edwin Sherbon Hills CBE FAA FRS (31 August 1906 – 2 May 1986) was an Australian geologist, a Foundation fellow of the Australian Academy of Science and at the time of his death was regarded as one of Australia's "most eminent scientists and most accomplished geologists".

Hills grew in the Melbourne suburb Carlton. He was dux of Carlton Primary School and received a scholarship to attend University High School. Hills graduated from high school in 1924 and with classmate Harrie Massey received a scholarship to attend the University of Melbourne. Hills had chosen his undergraduate courses with the idea of becoming a chemist and took geology as a suitable ancillary, however his studies led him to become a geologist and physiographer. Hills undertook his MSc at the University of Melbourne under E. W. Skeats, his graduate field work was based at Cathedral Range just outside Melbourne and he studied fossil fishes, acid vulcanism and physiography in the area.

With Skeats' support Hills was awarded a 1851 Exhibition scholarship to travel to the United Kingdom and attend the Royal College of Science (now the Imperial College of Science, Technology and Medicine). He began his PhD studies there in mid-1929 and continued to research fossil fishes and on the petrology and mineralogy of igneous rocks. During the course of his studies he was elected to the Geological Society of London. At the completion of his studies Hills was offered a position in the William George Fearnsides at the British Museum, however Skeats had gone to some effort to secure an academic position for Hills at the University of Melbourne; so Hills returned to Melbourne and began lecturing at the university in 1932. In the same year he married Claire Doris Fox whom he had met in London and they had three children together.

Hills lectured at the university from 1932 to 1943 climbing the academic ranks from lecturer, senior lecturer to associate professor; he became a full professor and the Chair of the geology department in 1944, he held this position until 1971. He also involved in the university administration serving as Deputy Vice-Chancellor from 1962 to 1971. While at Melbourne his fields of research were broad encompassing Australian fossil fishes of the Upper Devonian and Cainozoic, physiography, hydrology, petrology and mineralogy of Victoria and economic geology. In addition to scientific papers and monographs, Hills produced three geology textbooks; Outlines of Structural Geology (first published in 1940), The Physiography of Victoria: an Introduction to Geomorphology (first published in 1940), Elements of Structural Geology (first published in 1963), each was reprinted into multiple editions.

Hills was the founding chair of the Geological Society of Australia in 1951 and in the same year received the Bigsby Medal from Geological Society of London. In 1954 he was elected to the Royal Society and was a founding fellow of Australia's learned science organisation, the Australian Academy of Science. He served as a member of the UNESCO International Advisory Committee on Arid Zone Research and on numerous other advisory boards. For his contributions he was made a Commander of the Order of the British Empire in 1971.

== Legacy ==
The E. S. Hills Medal is awarded by the Geological Society of Australia to recognise outstanding contributions to the field of geoscience. The medal is a testament to the achievements and dedication of individuals who have made significant impacts in the study and practice of geoscience.
