= Bishop of Melbourne =

The Bishop of Melbourne may refer to:

- Anglican Bishop of Melbourne, precursor title of the Anglican Archbishop of Melbourne
- Roman Catholic Bishop of Melbourne, precursor title of the Roman Catholic Archbishop of Melbourne
