= Sovereign Hill =

Open-air museum in Australia

Coordinates: 37°34.507′S 143°51.954′E

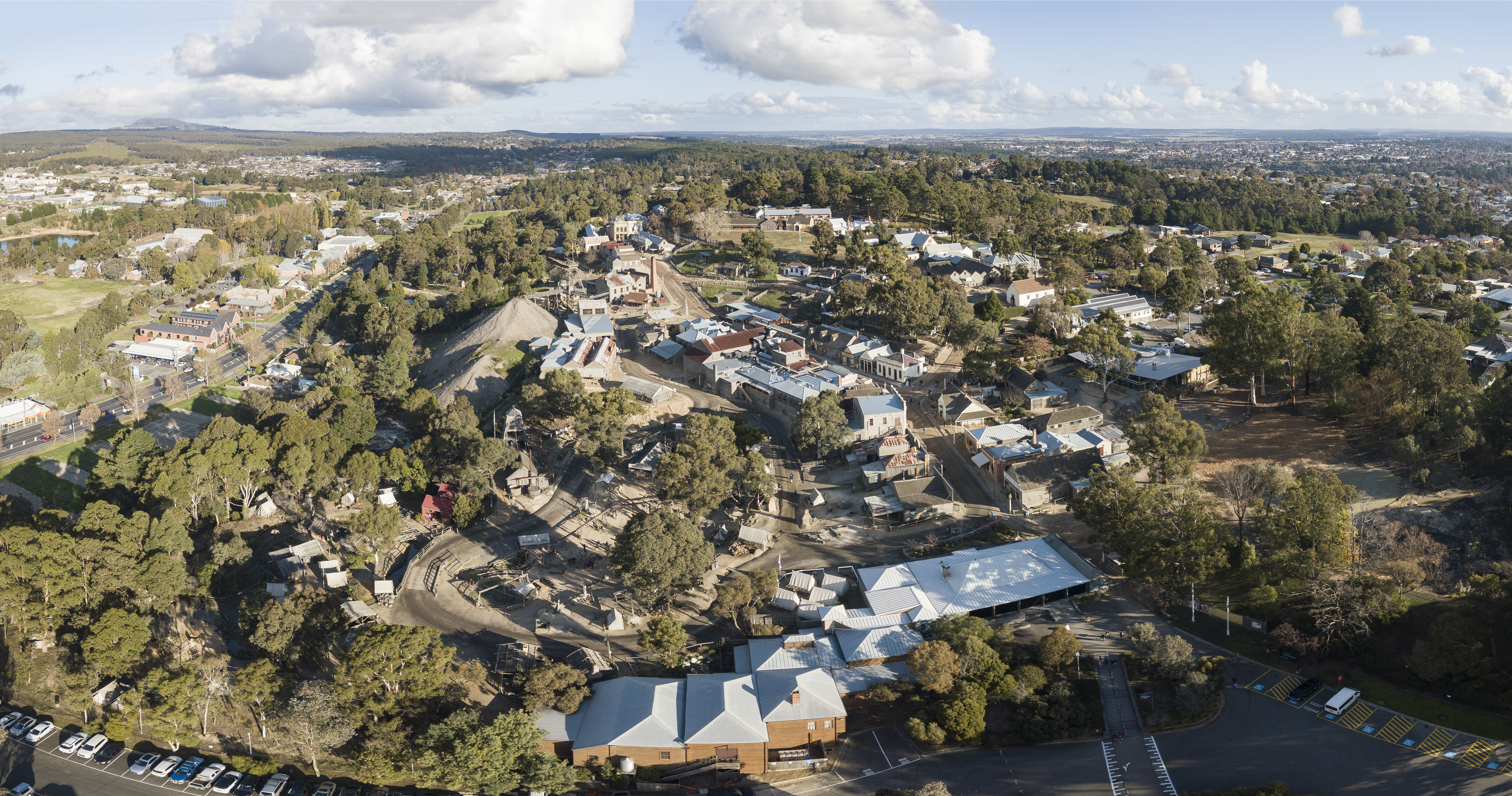
Aerial panorama of Sovereign Hill

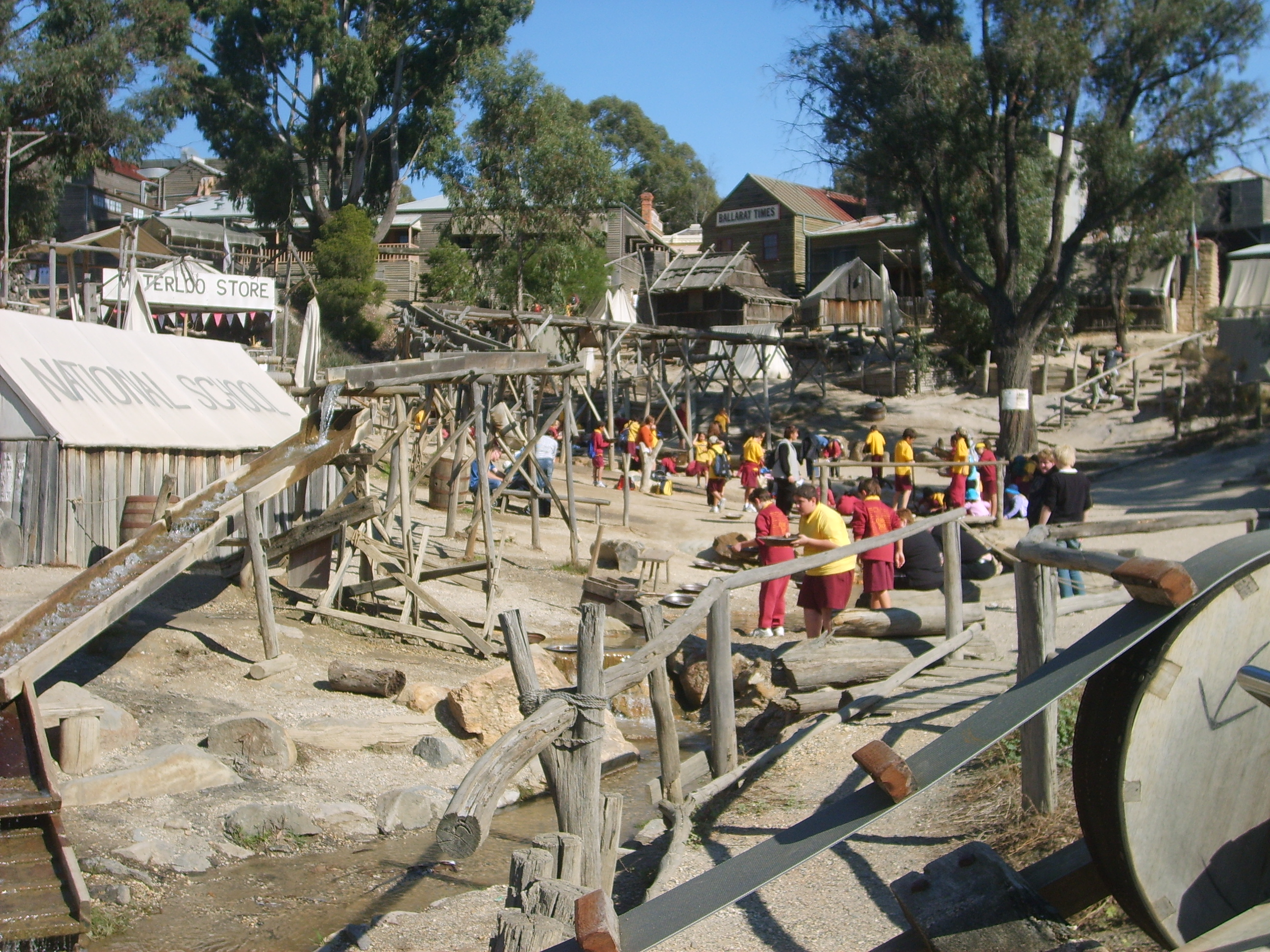
The gold diggings

Sovereign Hill is an open-air museum in Golden Point, a suburb of Ballarat, Victoria, Australia. Sovereign Hill depicts Ballarat's first ten years after the discovery of gold there in 1851 and has become a nationally acclaimed tourist attraction. It is one of Victoria's most popular attractions and Ballarat's most famous. As part of a major 20-year Master Plan, the museum has recently expanded its cultural and educational focus with the establishment of new national centres and precincts dedicated to rare trades, gold rush collections, and Wadawurrung culture.

Set in the Australian 1850s, the complex is located on a 25-hectare site that is linked to the richest alluvial gold rush in the world. The site comprises over 60 historically recreated buildings, with costumed staff and volunteers, who are able to answer questions and will pose for photos. The recreation is completed with antiques, artwork, books and papers, machinery, livestock and animals, carriages, and devices all appropriate to the era.

== History ==
The second-largest gold nugget in the world was found in Ballarat in the Red Hill Mine which is recreated in Sovereign Hill. The Welcome Nugget weighed 69 kg,(2,200 ounces) and comprised 99.2% pure gold, valued at about 10,596 pounds when found, and worth over US$3 million in gold now, or far more as a specimen.

The idea of Sovereign Hill was floated in Ballarat in the 1960s, as a way to preserve historic buildings and to recreate the gold diggings that made the city. The complex was officially opened to the public on 29 November 1970.

Main street is a loose reconstruction of Main Street, Ballarat East which was once the settlement's main street, consisting of timber buildings. It was consumed in a large fire during the 1860s and a more substantial town centre planned around Sturt and Lydiard Street in Ballarat West.

== Attractions ==
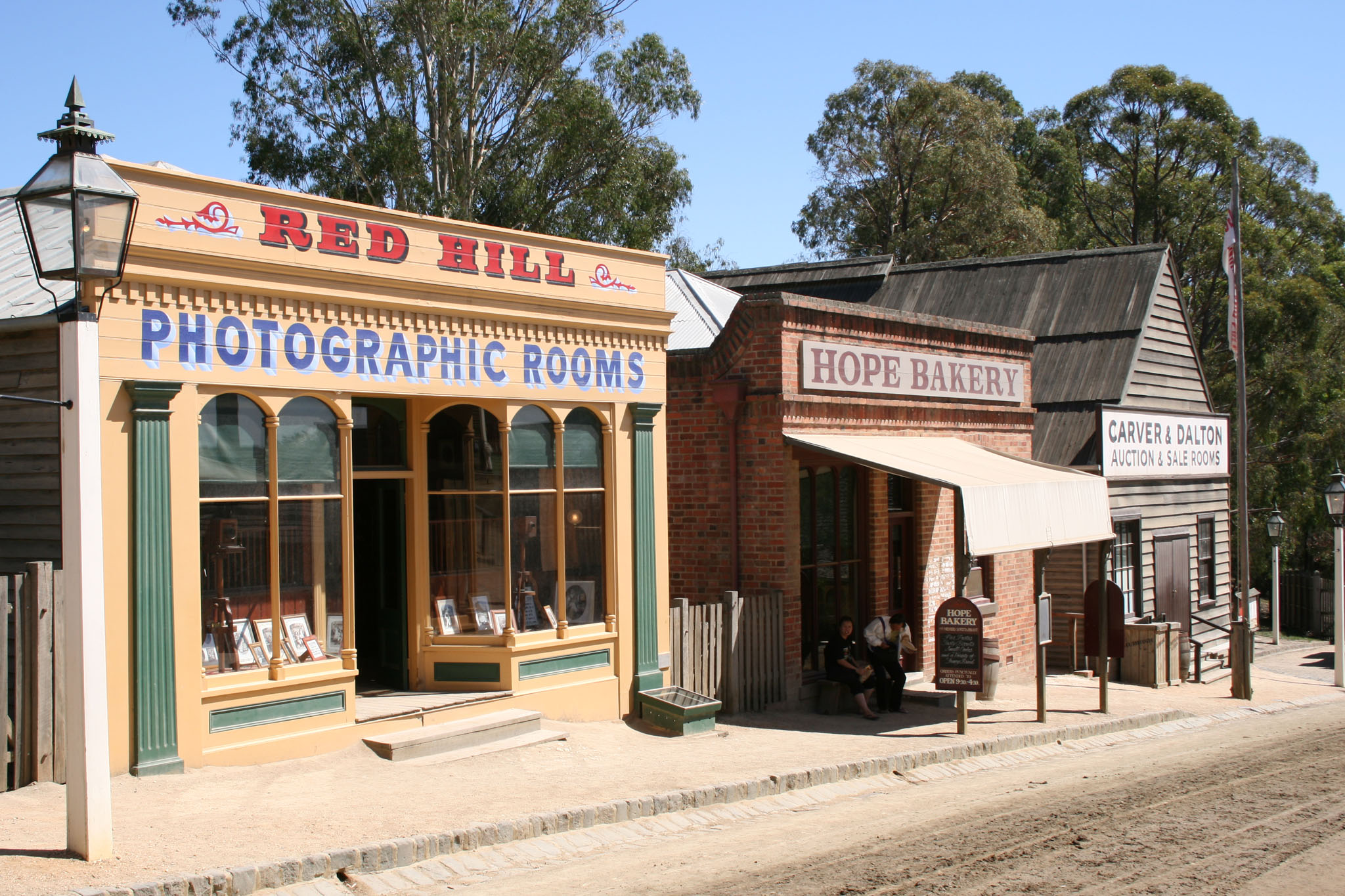
A bakery and other assorted shops on main street.

Main Street is lined with shops, two hotels and a theatre. There is a blacksmith's workshop, stables, photography studio, apothecary, bakery, jeweller's shop, grocer, tentmaker, tinsmith, bank, post office, candle-dipping shop, lolly shop, nine-pin bowling saloon and library. Behind Main Street there are a number of period cottages which are open for visitors. There are also four schools where children in school-groups dress in period costume and attend as a child of the 1850s.

A number of workshops at Sovereign Hill display traditional trades such as coachbuilder, wheelwright, tinsmith, blacksmith and farrier.

=== Gold Diggings and Panning ===
The Gold Diggings precinct, a central area for visitors to pan for real gold, has undergone extensive refurbishment to enhance accessibility and inclusivity. This includes the creation of an accessible gold panning zone with an elevated water channel and improved pathways to allow for easier access by all visitors, including those using wheelchairs or with sensory needs.This area is surrounded by tents and buildings contemporary to the early years of the gold rush.

=== Gold Pour ===
A key attraction at Sovereign Hill is the Gold Pour demonstration, where pure gold valued at over $500,000 is melted and poured into a three-kilogram bullion bar.

=== Mine Tours ===
There are two mines which have guided tours at regular intervals. The Red Hill Mine is a self-guided tour that tells the story of a group of Cornishmen and their discovery of the Welcome Nugget. The Sovereign Quartz Mine runs 40-minute guided tours and features several underground displays. Above ground it also features steam-driven machinery for pumping water and processing the ore. More recently an attraction titled "Trapped" has been added. This exhibit, which is set in series of above-ground concrete structures designed to look like tunnels from within, tells the story of the New Australasian Gold Mine disaster at Creswick in 1882. Twenty-two miners died because of the collapse and flooding of the New Australasian No. 2 Mine. This is still considered one of Australia's worst mining disasters. Australia's worst mining disaster was the Mount Keira Mine Disaster in 1902 which killed 96 workers.

== Mine tram ==
The Sovereign Hill mine tram, opened in March 2008, is an inclined tramway that takes tourists into the mine for a tour. Each tram is 1.35 metres wide and 1.55 metres high, and can carry 33 passengers. The tram goes through a flap, and.

== Wadawurrung Cultural Precinct ==
Sovereign Hill has established the Wadawurrung Cultural Precinct to acknowledge and share the culture and history of the Wadawurrung people, the Traditional Owners of the land. This space is dedicated to cultural education, storytelling, and connecting visitors with the region's ancient past alongside its gold rush history.

== Australian Centre for Gold Rush Collections ==
The Australian Centre for Gold Rush Collections houses and manages Sovereign Hill's collection of over 150,000 objects related to the gold rush era. It operates as a research and collections hub, providing public access to the archive through tours, programs, and an online database.

== See also ==
- Chilean mill, a replica of which has been constructed at Sovereign Hill open-air museum in Ballarat.

== Bibliography ==
- Frost, W (2005) Making an edgier interpretation of the Gold Rushes: contrasting perspectives from Australia and New Zealand. International Journal of Heritage Studies, 11 (3), pp. 235–250.
- Evans, M (1991) Historical interpretation at Sovereign Hill. Australian Historical Studies 24 (96), pp. 142–152.
