= Welcome Stranger =

Largest alluvial gold nugget ever found

Coordinates: 36°45′41″S 143°39′08.8″E

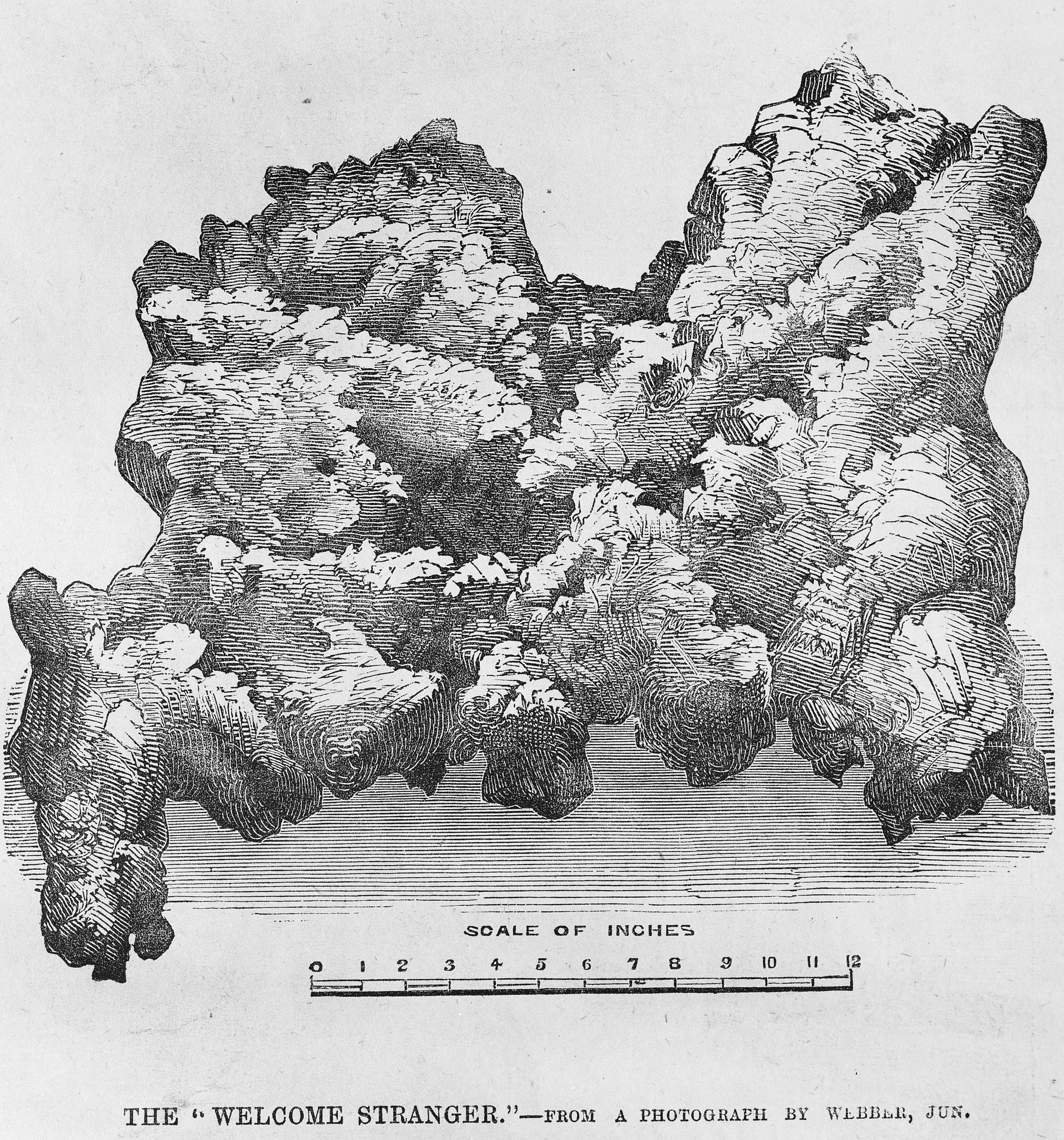
A wood engraving of the Welcome Stranger published in The Illustrated Australian News for Home Reader on 1 March 1869. The scale bar across the bottom represents 12 inches (30 cm).

The Welcome Stranger was the largest alluvial gold nugget ever discovered. It was unearthed by Cornish miners John Deason and Richard Oates on 5 February 1869 in Moliagul, 9 miles (14 km) north-west of Dunolly in Victoria, Australia.

== Discovery ==
Found only 3 cm (1.2 in) below the surface, near the base of a tree on a slope leading to what was then known as Bulldog Gully, the nugget had a gross weight of 109.59 kilograms (3,523.5 ozt) (241 lb 10 oz). Its trimmed weight was 78 kilograms (2,520 ozt) (210 lbs), and its net weight was 72.02 kilograms (2,315.5 ozt) (192 lbs 11.5 oz).

At the time of the discovery, there were no scales capable of weighing a nugget this large, so it was broken into three pieces on an anvil by Dunolly-based blacksmith Archibald Walls.

Deason, Oates, and a few friends took the nugget to the London Chartered Bank of Australia, in Dunolly, which advanced them £9,000. Deason and Oates were finally paid an estimated £9,381 (equivalent to A$1,485,000 in 2022) for their nugget, which became known as the "Welcome Stranger". At February 2026 gold prices, it would be worth approximately US$11.6 million [8.5 million GBP]. It was heavier than the "Welcome Nugget" of 69.0 kilograms (2,217 ozt) that had been found in Ballarat in 1858. The goldfields warden F. K. Orme reported that 70.57 kilograms (2,269 ozt) of smelted gold had been obtained from it, irrespective of scraps that were given away by the finders, estimated as totalling another 1.46 kilograms (47 ozt).

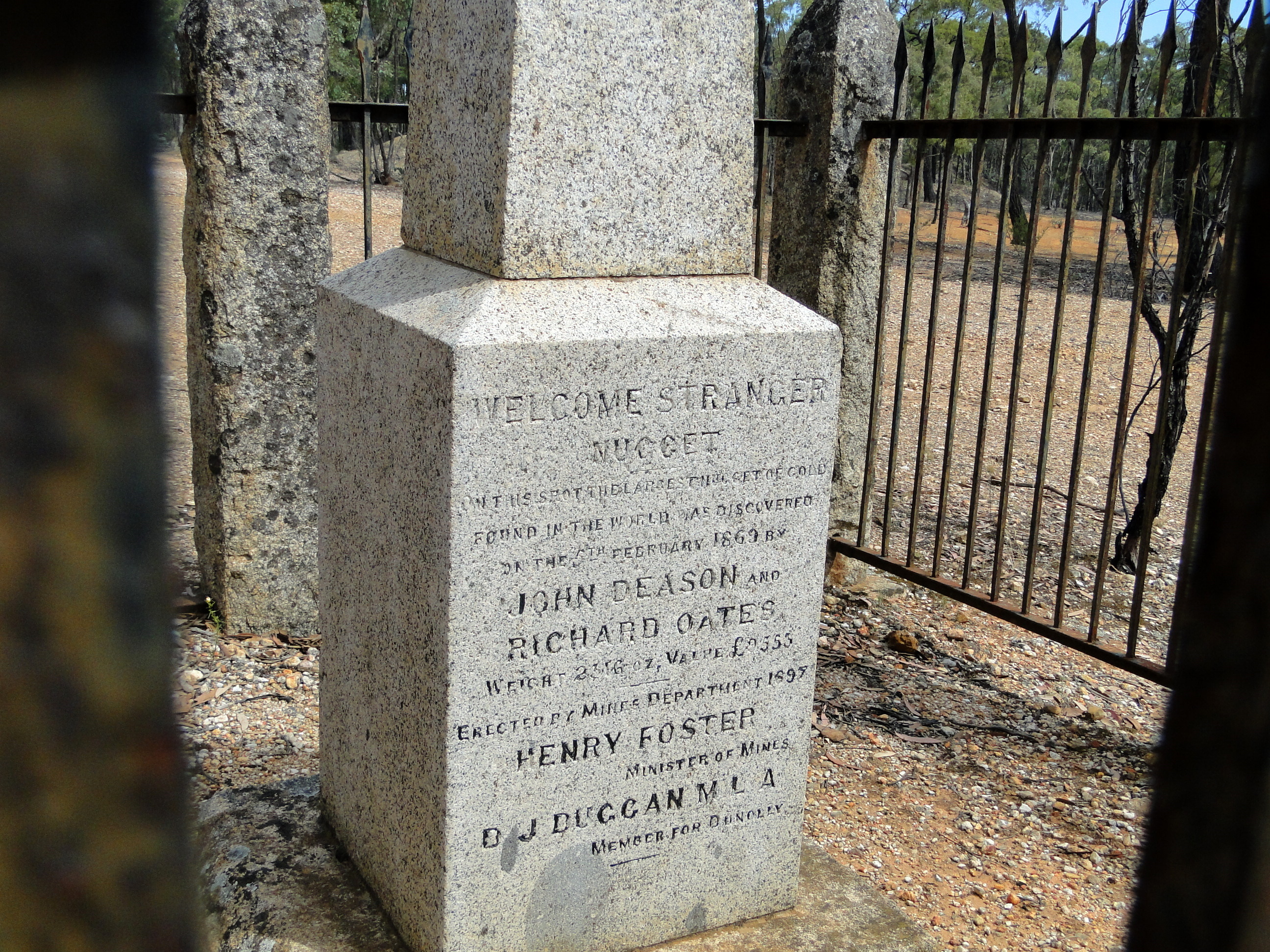
The text on the commemorative obelisk in pillared railings

The nugget was soon melted down and the gold was sent as ingots to Melbourne for forwarding to the Bank of England. It left the country on board the steamship Reigate which departed on 21 February.

An obelisk commemorating the discovery of the "Welcome Stranger" was erected near the spot in 1897. A replica of the "Welcome Stranger" is in the Old Treasury building, Treasury Place, Melbourne, Victoria; another replica is owned by descendants of John Deason and is now on display at the Dunolly Rural Transaction Centre.

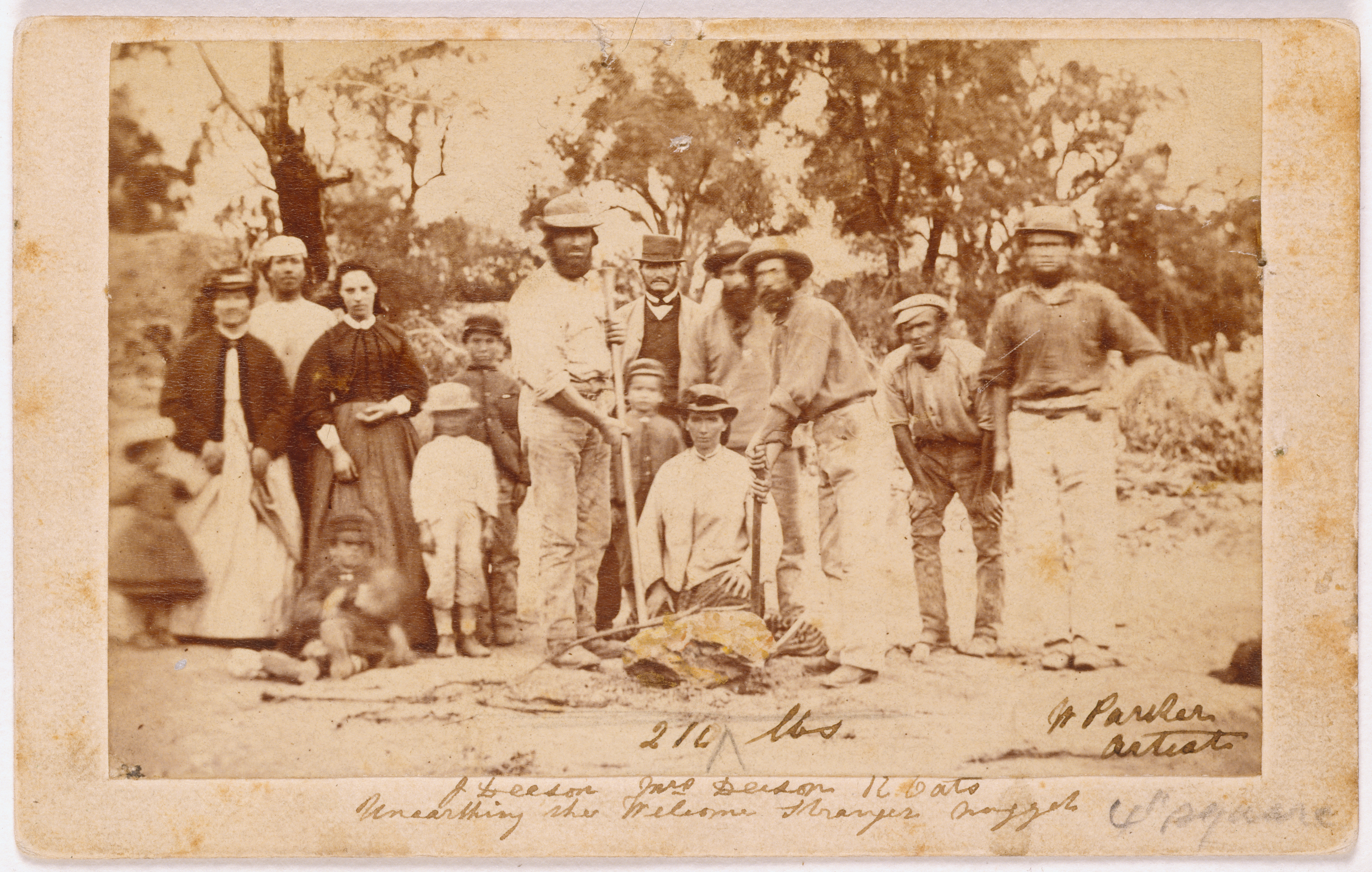
Miners and their wives posing with the finders of the nugget, Richard Oates, John Deason and his wife

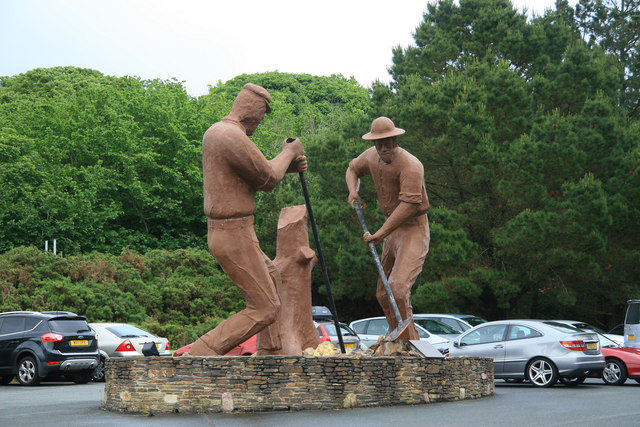
Statue in Redruth, Cornwall, England, celebrating the find.

== Discoverers ==
John Deason was born in 1829 on the island of Tresco, Isles of Scilly, 45 km (28 mi) off the southwestern tip of Cornwall, England, UK. In 1851, he was a tin dresser before becoming a gold miner. Deason continued with gold mining and workings most of his life and, although he became a store keeper at Moliagul, he lost a substantial proportion of his wealth through poor investments in gold mining. He bought a small farm near Moliagul where he lived until he died in 1915, aged 85 years.

Richard Oates was born about 1827 at Pendeen in Cornwall. After the 1869 find, Oates returned to the UK and married. He returned to Australia with his wife and they had four children. The Oates family, in 1895, purchased 3.2 square kilometres (800 acres) of land at Marong, Victoria, about 24 kilometres (15 mi) west of Bendigo, Victoria, which Oates farmed until his death in Marong in 1906, aged 79 years.

Descendants of the two discoverers gathered to celebrate the 150th anniversary of the discovery of the nugget.

== See also ==
- List of gold nuggets by size
- Beyers-Holtermann Specimen, the largest specimen of native gold ever mined. It was reef gold, with quartz, and so not a nugget.
