= Fricot Nugget =

Large gold nugget found in California in 1865

The Fricot Nugget is a crystalline gold nugget found in El Dorado County, California in 1865 during the California Gold Rush by William Russell Davis. It is listed as the eleventh largest gold nugget ever found, and is the second largest gold nugget found in the United States of America. At 201 troy ounces (13.8 lb; 6.3 kg), it is the largest surviving single piece of gold from the California Gold Rush.

The nugget was found in Davis' Grit Mine at Spanish Dry Diggings at a depth of 200 feet (61 m), and was eventually shipped to New York City, where it was purchased by Jules Fricot for approximately $3,500. Fricot took the nugget to Paris for the 1878 Paris Exposition. Following the Paris Exposition, the Fricot Nugget was missing until 1943, when it was found in a safe deposit box in Calaveras County, California.

The nugget is on permanent display in the California State Mining and Mineral Museum. It came close to being stolen in 2012 during a robbery at the museum; however, safety measures protected it from being taken by the intruders.
