= Moliagul =

- Town
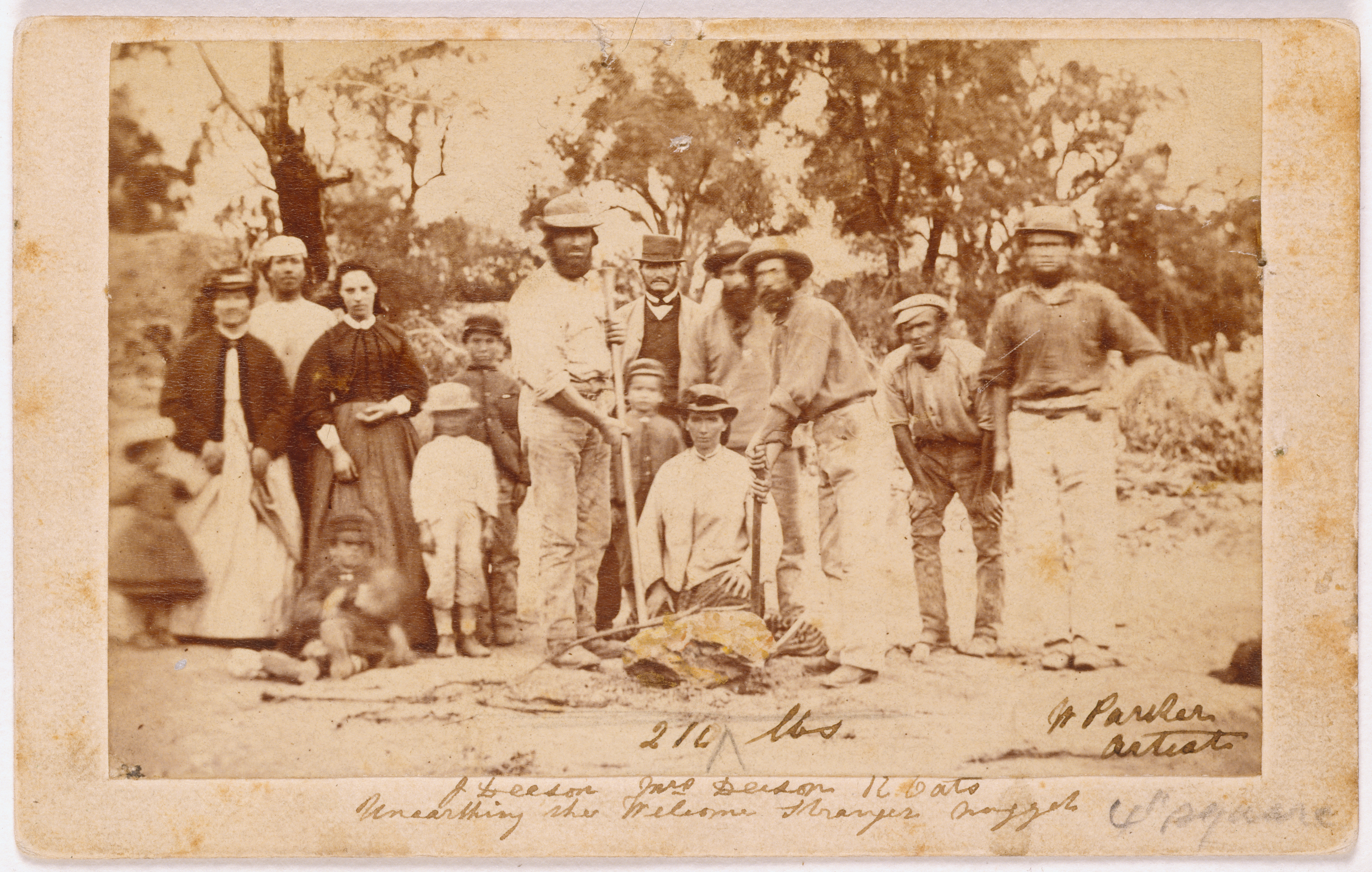
- Miners and their wives posing with the finders of the largest alluvial gold find in the world, the Welcome Stranger.

- Coordinates: 36°45′03″S 143°39′47″E
- Country: Australia
- State: Victoria
- LGAs: Shire of Central Goldfields; Shire of Loddon
- Location: 202 km (126 mi) NW of Melbourne; 64 km (40 mi) W of Bendigo; 16 km (9.9 mi) NW of Dunolly

Government
  - State electorate: Bendigo West
  - Federal division: Mallee

Population
  - Total: 80 (2021 census)
- Postcode: 3472

Moliagul is a locality in the Shire of Central Goldfields and Shire of Loddon, Victoria, Australia, located 202 kilometres (126 mi) northwest of Melbourne and 60 kilometres (37 mi) west of Bendigo. The area is notable for the discovery of a number of gold nuggets. These finds include the world's largest, the Welcome Stranger, which was discovered in 1869 by John Deason and Richard Oates. At the 2021 census, Moliagul had a population of 80.

Moliagul is composed of scattered rural dwellings and small farms, a hotel (now closed), museum, the old school (now a hall) and former church.

Mount Moliagul is located in the locality.

== History ==
The name Moliagul is believed to be a derivation of the Aboriginal word "moliagulk", meaning "wooded hill". In late 1852, gold was discovered in Queen's Gully and the settlement of Moliagul sprang up almost immediately. By January of the next year a thriving goldfields town with a store, a butcher's shop and a blacksmith's forge had opened but almost immediately the new settlement was abandoned as people departed for the Sandy Creek gold rush.

In July 1855, gold was found at Little Hill and a second gold rush occurred in the Moliagul area. In 1855 it is estimated there were 16,000 people living in the immediate area during the peak of the Victorian gold rush period. In 1856 the Mount Moliagul Hotel was opened. Moliagul Post Office opened on 15 November 1858 and closed in 1971. The Moliagul Cemetery contains the headstones of many families, such as the Deason's, which date back to the gold rush times.

== Notable people ==
- Reverend John Flynn, the Presbyterian minister and aviator who founded the Royal Flying Doctor Service and who is featured on the current Australian twenty-dollar note was born in Moliagul. The John Flynn Memorial, a stone monument, is located in Moliagul.

== Notes ==
- The travelers guide to the Goldfields: History and natural heritage trails through Central and Western Victoria. Torquay, Bestshot, 2006.
