= Welcome Nugget =

69 kg gold nugget discovered at Bakery Hill in Ballarat, Victoria

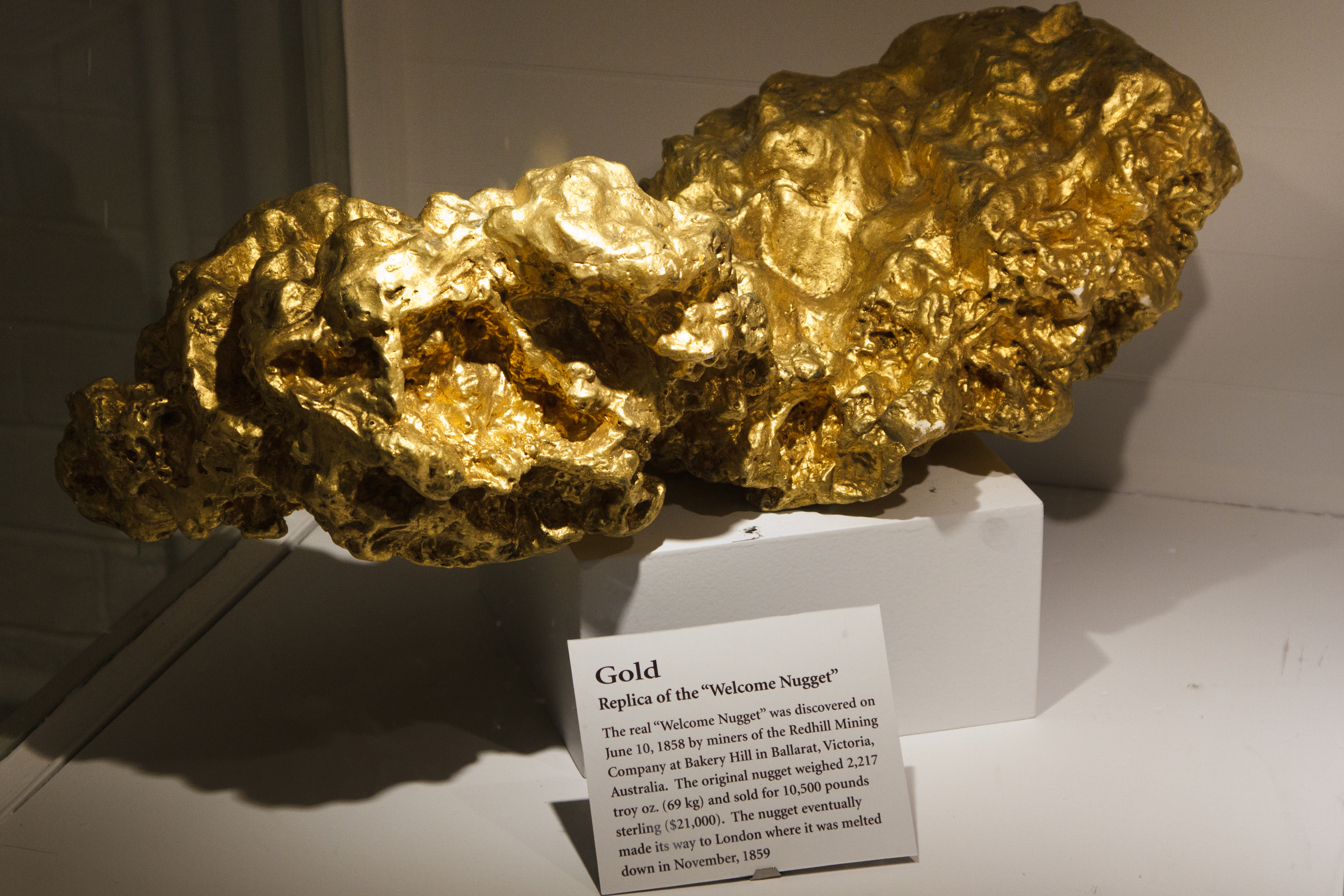
The "Welcome Nugget" replica at the Harvard Mineralogical Museum, USA.

The Welcome Nugget was a large gold nugget, weighing 2,217 troy ounces 16 pennyweight. (68.98 kg), that was discovered by a group of twenty-two Cornish miners at the Red Hill Mining Company site at Bakery Hill (near the present intersection of Mair and Humffray Street) in Ballarat, Victoria, Australia, on 9 June 1858. It was located in the roof of a tunnel 55 metres (180 feet) underground. Shaped roughly like a horse's head, it measured around 49 cm (19 in) long by 15 cm (5.9 in) wide and 15 cm (5.9 in) high, and had a roughly indented surface. It was assayed by William Birkmyre of the Port Phillip Gold Company and given its name by finder Richard Jeffery. Eclipsed by the discovery of the larger Welcome Stranger eleven years later in 1869 (also in Victoria), it remains the second largest gold nugget ever found.

The finders had been among the first to introduce steam-driven machinery into the field at Ballarat and had looked first at nearby Creswick with no luck. Their luck changed at Bakery Hill, however, and several smaller nuggets weighing from 12 to 45 troy ounces had been uncovered before they found the Welcome.

It was found in 1858 at the diggings of Ballarat, Victoria. The proprietors of a "hole" went away to lunch, leaving a hired man digging with a pickaxe. After the pick struck something, the workman dug around it to see what it was, then he fainted. The owners returned and, believing the prostrate man to be dead, one of them jumped in, turned him over, and also fainted. Both of them were dragged out and digging was wildly begun for the nugget, which lay partly exposed. The mass was so great that the men at first thought they had struck a reef of pure gold.

Sold for £10,500, it found a home in Melbourne until being sold again on 18 March 1859. It weighed 2,195 troy ounces (68.3 kg) and fetched £9,325 at its resale. From there it was conveyed to Sydney and exhibited there before being transported and exhibited in the Crystal Palace in London. The Royal Mint bought it in November 1859 and minted gold sovereigns out of it.

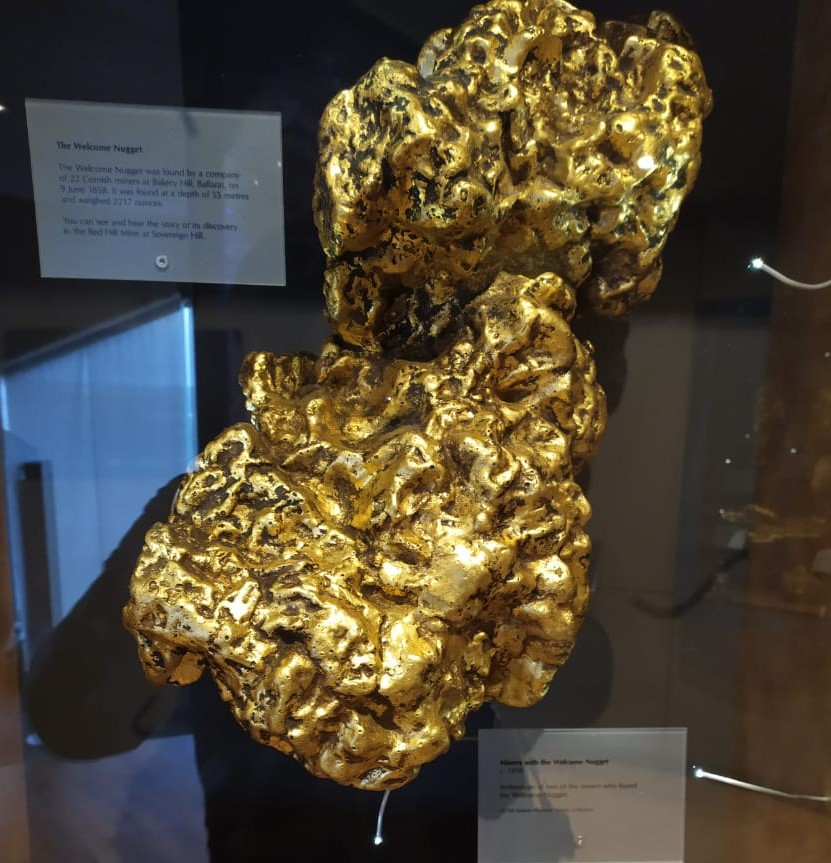
Replica of Welcome Nugget at Museums Victoria

Models of the Welcome Nugget were made and distributed to the Geological and Mining Museum in the Rocks in Sydney, and the Museum of Victoria, as well as the Powerhouse Museum, who purchased their model in 1885. Models are also a feature of two displays in Ballarat, the Pioneer Miners (Gold) Monument on the corner of Sturt and Albert Streets in Ballarat Central (1951) and at The Gold Museum opposite Sovereign Hill at Golden Point. In the United States, a replica of the "Welcome Nugget" is exhibited in the Mineralogical Museum at Harvard University in Cambridge, Massachusetts.

== See also ==
- List of gold nuggets by size
