= Charles La Trobe =

English-born Australian colonial administrator

Charles Latrobe CB
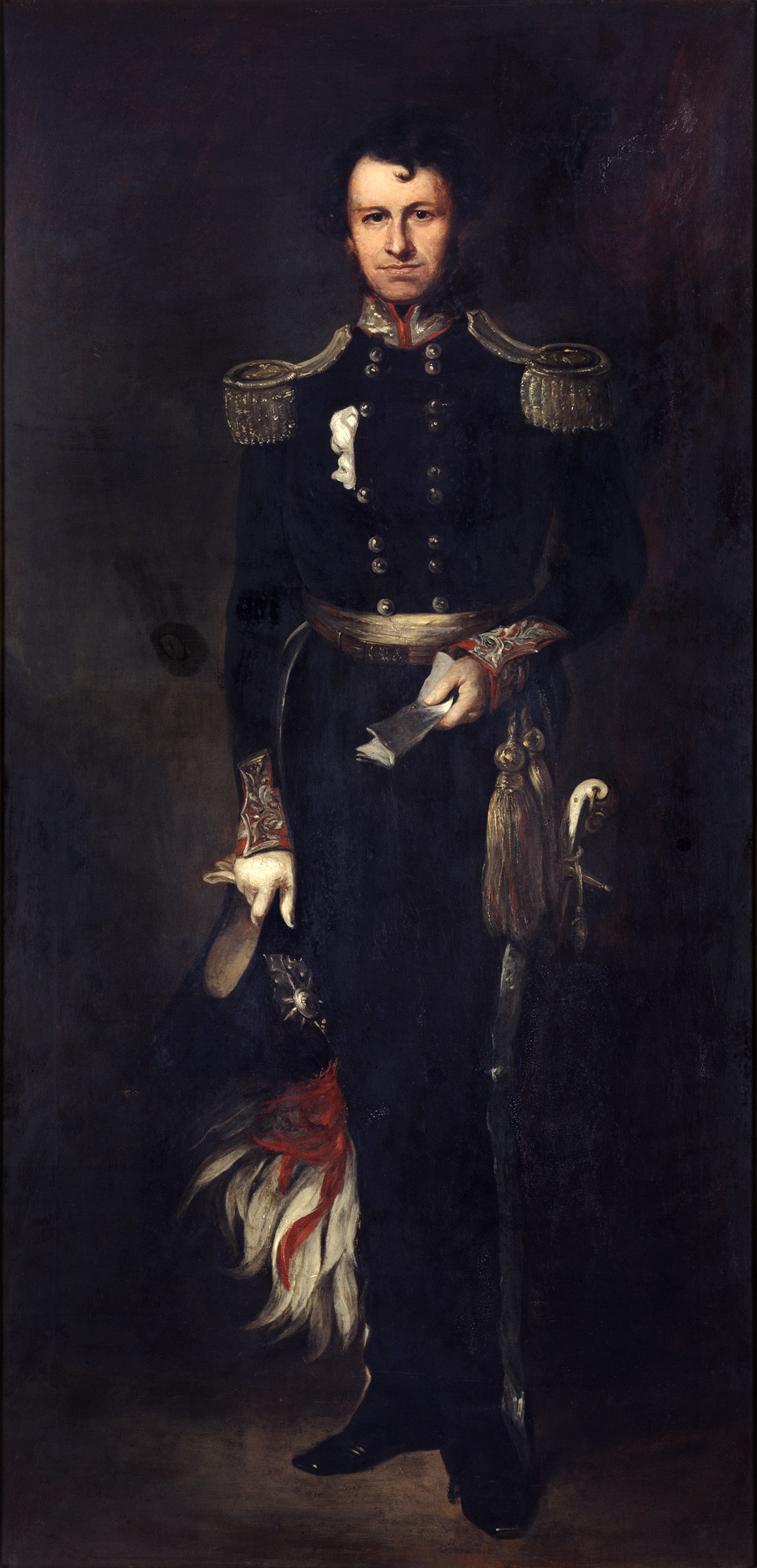

1st Lieutenant-Governor of Victoria
- In office 15 July 1851 – 5 May 1854
- Monarch: Queen Victoria
- Succeeded by: Sir Charles Hotham

1st Superintendent of Port Phillip
- In office 4 February 1839 – 14 July 1851
- Governor: George Gipps; Charles FitzRoy

Personal details
- Born: Charles Joseph La Trobe; 20 March 1801 London, England
- Died: 4 December 1875 (aged 74) Litlington, East Sussex, England
- Resting place: Litlington Church
- Spouse(s): Sophie de Montmollin (1835–1854); Rose Isabelle de Meuron (1855–1875)
- Relations: Benjamin Henry Latrobe (uncle)
- Children: 6
- Parent: Christian Ignatius Latrobe (father)

Charles Joseph La Trobe CB (20 March 1801 – 4 December 1875), commonly Latrobe, was appointed in 1839 superintendent of the Port Phillip District of New South Wales and, after the establishment in 1851 of the colony of Victoria (now a state of Australia), he became its first lieutenant-governor.

In the 1830s, La Trobe headed a Grand Tour trip for Albert Pourtales, encompassing North America. On the trip, the two sometimes traveled with Washington Irving and Henry Leavitt Ellsworth. They witnessed Indian Removal, indigenous customs, and visited natural attractions like Niagara Falls and Minnehaha Falls.

La Trobe was a strong supporter of religious, cultural and educational institutions. During his time as superintendent and lieutenant-governor he oversaw the establishment of the Botanic Gardens, and provided leadership and support to the formation of entities such as the Mechanic's Institute, the Royal Melbourne Hospital, the Royal Philharmonic, the Melbourne Cricket Ground and the University of Melbourne.

La Trobe was the son of Christian Ignatius Latrobe, a prominent Moravian bishop, and nephew of British architect Benjamin Henry Latrobe.

== Early life ==
Charles La Trobe was born in London, the son of Christian Ignatius Latrobe, a leader of the Moravian Church, from a family of French Huguenot descent, whose mother was a member of the Moravian Church born in the United States. He was educated in England and later spent time in Switzerland and was active in mountaineering; he made a number of ascents in the Alps 1824–26. La Trobe wrote several travel books describing his experiences: The Alpenstock: Or Sketches of Swiss Scenery and Manners (1829) and The Pedestrian: A Summer's Ramble in the Tyrol (1832). Charles's uncle (Christian's brother) was the British-American "father of American architecture" Benjamin Henry Latrobe who designed the White House porticos.

In 1832, La Trobe visited the United States, chaperoning Count Albert Pourtales on a Grand Tour. The two met Washington Irving on their ship to America,with whom they would travel for six months. The three visited New England, the White Mountains, and Niagara Falls. Soon after, they met Henry Leavitt Ellsworth, who brought them to Missouri, Arkansas Territory, and what is now Oklahoma to see lands claimed by the U.S. for the relocation of displaced Native nations. Using the La Trobe home in Baltimore as a base, Charles and Pourtales visited every U.S. state except Alabama. They saw Native effigy mounds, the imprisoned Sauk leader Black Hawk twice, and attended the powwows and treaty negotiations of the Powatomi in Chicago. Pourtales engaged in sex tourism on the trip, often engaging in Indigenous practices in order to gain sexual favors. In 1833, La Trobe visited Fort Snelling in Dakota territory with Pourtales, as some of the earliest white tourists to the area. While camping at Bad Axe River, they witnessed the meteor shower of the Leonids.

In 1834, travelled from New Orleans to Mexico with Washington Irving. He then wrote the epistolary travel account The Rambler in North America, 1832–1835 (1835) and The Rambler in Mexico (1836). Author Edgar Allen Poe called The Rambler in North America "the best book in America yet published", and John Stuart Mill said that the work contained "some of the most attractive descriptions we ever read". The London Quarterly Review called it "the book of the season as far as America is concerned".

On 16 September 1835, he married Sophie de Montmollin (1809–1854) in Berne, Switzerland. Their first child, Agnes Louisa de La Trobe, was born in Switzerland on 2 April 1837.

== Lieutenant-governor ==
In 1837, La Trobe was entrusted with a government commission in the West Indies. Here, he acted as inspector of the Negro Education Grant from 1837. As inspector, he produced three reports detailing the disbursement of an imperial government grant for education in the West Indian colonies.

On 4 February 1839, he was appointed superintendent of the Port Phillip District of New South Wales, even though he had little managerial and administrative experience. With his wife and 2-year-old daughter, La Trobe sailed into Sydney on 26 July 1839, for training on procedures. The La Trobes went on to Melbourne on 1 October.

At auction, La Trobe bought 12 1/2 acres (5.1 ha) of land at the edge of the city, in what is now called Jolimont, at the upset price of £20 per acre. On that land, La Trobe erected his home, which he had transported from London in sections, and which is preserved as LaTrobe's Cottage.

Melbourne had a population of around 3,000 at the time and was rapidly expanding. La Trobe commenced works to improve sanitation and streets. As the Port Phillip District was a dependency of New South Wales, all land sales, building plans and officer appointments had to be approved by Gipps, with whom La Trobe had a good personal and working relationship.

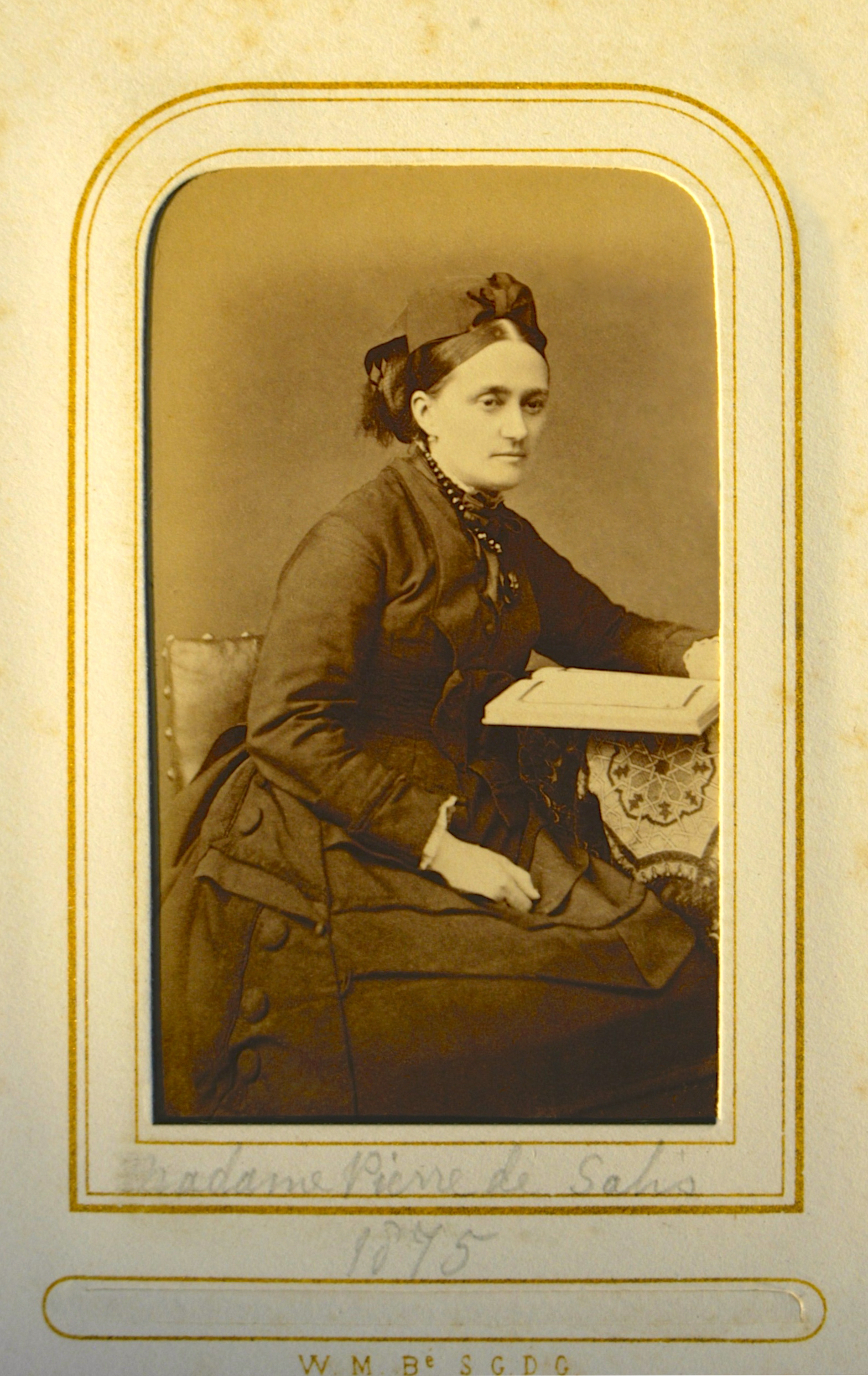
A carte de visite photo of Charles Latrobe's daughter, Agnes Louisa, Madame Pierre de Salis (1837–1916) in 1875.

A Separation Association had been formed in 1840, with the aim of making the Port Phillip District a separate colony. In 1841, La Trobe wrote to Gipps, asking him to visit Melbourne to form his own opinion on the separation question. La Trobe did not actively campaign for separation, being content that Earl Grey had included separation in the reorganisation plan for the colonies. La Trobe also acted as lieutenant-governor of Van Diemen's Land for four months in 1846–47.

In July 1851, the Port Phillip achieved separation from New South Wales, becoming the colony of Victoria, and La Trobe became lieutenant-governor – a position he held until 1854. Soon after separation, gold was discovered at several locations in Victoria. La Trobe suddenly had to deal with the mass exodus of the population of Melbourne to the gold fields, as well as the later arrival of thousands of immigrants from other Australian colonies and overseas.

He was commonly referred to as "Charley Joe", and by extension, any government officials or policemen were called "joes". Having tried, with varying degrees of success, to cope with the enormous population and economic expansion of the new colony, La Trobe, who suffered criticism due to his inexperience, submitted his resignation in December 1852, but had to wait until a replacement, Charles Hotham, could take his place.

== After Victoria ==
Towards the end of his governorship, La Trobe's wife, Sophie, became ill and returned to Europe with their four children. She died on 30 January 1854. On his return to Europe after his term, La Trobe married Sophie's sister, Rose Isabelle de Meuron (1821–1883) in 1855, a marriage which was illegal in English law, being considered incestuous at the time. (See Deceased Wife's Sister's Marriage Act 1907.) The couple had two daughters (born 1856 and 1859) in Switzerland and moved to England in 1861. La Trobe did not receive any further British government appointments. His eyesight was increasingly deteriorating, and he was completely blind for the last years of his life. He died in 1875.

== Geelong keys ==
La Trobe is also linked to the discovery of a minor piece of evidence suggesting early European exploration of Australia. In 1847, at Limeburners' Point near Geelong, Victoria, Charles La Trobe, a keen amateur geologist, was examining the shells from a lime kiln when a worker showed him a set of five keys that he claimed to have found, subsequently named the Geelong Keys. La Trobe concluded that, based on their appearance, the keys were dropped onto the beach around 100 to 150 years beforehand (i.e. between 1700 and 1750). In 1977, Kenneth McIntyre hypothesized they were dropped by Portuguese sailors under the command of Cristóvão de Mendonça. Since the keys have long been lost, their exact origin cannot be verified. However, research by geologist Edmund Gill and historian P.F.B. Alsop showed the deposit they were supposedly found in was 2330–2800 years old, making La Trobe's dating impossible.

== Views ==
=== Native Americans ===
Charles La Trobe espoused racist views about Native Americans in The Rambler in North America, 1832–1835, describing them as a "degenerate race", "both savage and sensual", and a slave "to vices introduced by the whites". He argued that Native American extermination was brought on by the "superior power and intellect of whites", although it was to be lamented. Despite his views, La Trobe called the Black Hawk War a "chronicle of shame", and was saddened by the lack of diplomacy during the conflict.

== Legacy ==
Much of Melbourne's substantial inner-ring parks and gardens can be attributed to La Trobe's foresight in reserving this land.

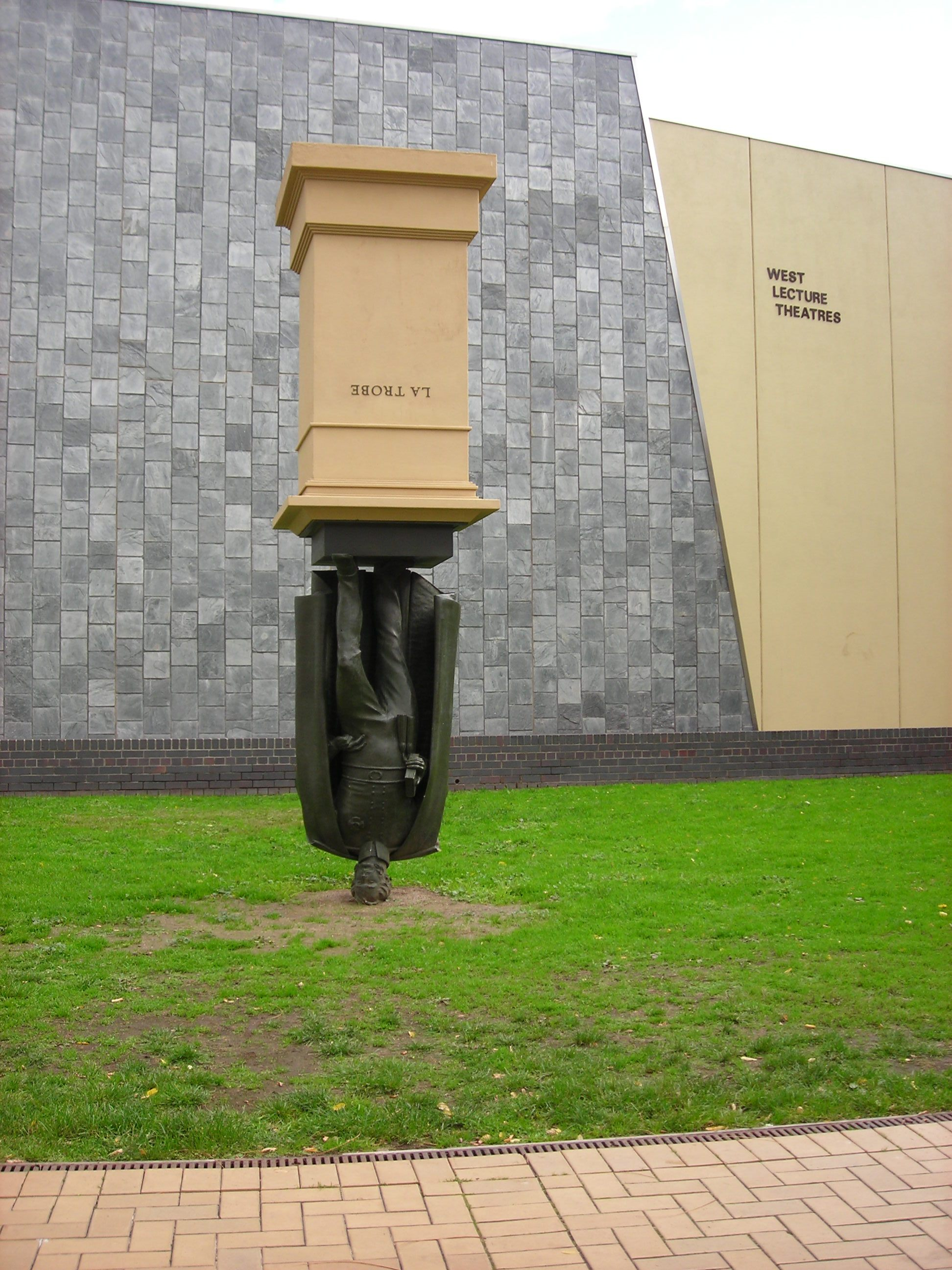
"Upside-down" statue of Charles La Trobe outside La Trobe University.

Melbourne and Victoria are dotted with things named in honour of La Trobe, including La Trobe Street, Latrobe River, La Trobe University, La Trobe Financial in the Melbourne central business district, and Charles La Trobe College in Melbourne's north east, the La Trobe Reading Room at the State Library of Victoria on La Trobe Street in the CBD, the federal electorate of La Trobe in Melbourne's outer east, the Latrobe Valley in southeastern Victoria, Mount LaTrobe in Wilsons Promontory and, in Tasmania, Latrobe and Latrobe Council.

There are statues of La Trobe outside the State Library and at La Trobe University's Bundoora campus, the latter statue is notable for initially being upside-down in appearance, symbolising the notion that universities have a duty to "turn ideas on their head".

The La Trobe Journal (founded 1968) is published by the State Library of Victoria. It is devoted to Australasia, especially in connection with Victoria.

The family motto of La Trobe is used at La Trobe University for their own motto. The motto in English is "whoever seeks shall find".

The flowering plant genus Latrobea was named after him.

He was a character in the 1949 film Eureka Stockade.

Mills (2007) has put the mix of railway gauges in Australia, particularly Victorian and therefore South Australian 5 ft 3 in (1,600 mm) against New South Wales's 1,435 mm (4 ft 8 1/2 in), down to a decision by LaTrobe in 1853 which was made without reference to the chain of command.

== Involvement in Native Police Corps ==
The Native Police Corps as the Aboriginal force was known, was limited initially to one division in the Port Phillip District of the colony, around Melbourne.

In 1842, the formation of the Native Police Corps was halted due to funding problems. These issues delayed reformation of the corps until Superintendent Charles La Trobe indicated he was willing to underwrite the costs in 1842.

Native Police Corps were primarily a force of armed and mounted Aboriginal police under the command of white officers. They were used to patrol the often vast geographical areas along the colonial frontier in order to conduct indiscriminate raids and punitive expeditions against Aboriginal people. The Native Police proved to be a brutally destructive instrument in the disintegration and dispossession of Indigenous Australians.

== Works ==
- The Alpenstock: Or Sketches of Swiss Scenery and Manners (1829)
- The Pedestrian: A Summer's Ramble in the Tyrol (1832)
- The Rambler in North America, 1832–1835 (1835)
- The Rambler in Mexico (1836)

== See also ==
- History of Melbourne
- French Australian
- Latrobe nugget

Government offices
New office	Lieutenant-Governor of Victoria; 1851–1854	Succeeded by Captain Sir Charles Hotham
