= Canaã =

- Municipality
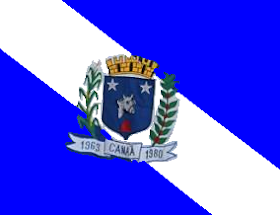
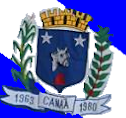
- Flag Coat of arms

- Location in Minas Gerais state

- Location in Brazil
- Coordinates: 20°41′9″S 42°37′12″W
- Country: Brazil
- Region: Southeast
- State: Minas Gerais

Area
  - Total: 175 km^{2} (68 sq mi)

Population (2020)
  - Total: 4,548
  - Density: 26.0/km^{2} (67.3/sq mi)
- Time zone: UTC-03:00 (BRT)
  - Summer (DST): UTC-02:00 (BRST)

Canaã (Portuguese for "Canaan") is a municipality in the state of Minas Gerais in Brazil. The population is 4,548 (2020 est.) in an area of 175 km^{2}.

== See also ==
- List of municipalities in Minas Gerais
