= Australian Journal of Earth Sciences =

- Discipline: Earth science
- Language: English
- Edited by: A.S. Andrew

Publication details
- Former name: Journal of the Geological Society of Australia
- History: 1953-present
- Publisher: Taylor & Francis on behalf of the Geological Society of Australia (Australia)
- Frequency: 8/year
- Impact factor: 1.417 (2012)

Standard abbreviations
- ISO 4: Aust. J. Earth Sci.

Indexing
- ISSN: 0812-0099 (print); 1440-0952 (web)
- OCLC no.: 45381897

Links
- Journal homepage; Online access; Online archive

The Australian Journal of Earth Sciences, subtitled An International Geoscience Journal of the Geological Society of Australia, is a peer-reviewed scientific journal that is published eight times per year by Taylor & Francis on behalf of the Geological Society of Australia. The journal broadly covers the earth sciences.

As of September 2023 the editors-in-chief are A.S. Andrew, of North Ryde, New South Wales, and C. L. Fergusson, of the University of Wollongong.

== History ==
The journal was established in 1953 as the Journal of the Geological Society of Australia and obtained its current name in 1984.

he BMR Journal of Australian Geology & Geophysics was established in March 1976 by the Bureau of Mineral Resources, Geology and Geophysics (BMR) to publish its scientists' research. Over time, it accepted external papers, which were peer-reviewed before publication. When in 1993 BMR changed its name to Australian Geological Survey Organisation, the journal was renamed AGSO Journal of Australian Geology & Geophysics. The last of these was volume 17, issue 5–6, published in February 2000, before government policy changed to favour external publishing of its findings, and it was merged into the Australian Journal of Earth Sciences.

== Abstracting and indexing ==
The journal is abstracted and indexed in:

- CSA Illumina
- CAB International
- Ceramic Abstracts
- Chemical Abstracts Service
- Current Awareness in Biological Sciences
- Engineering Index
- GEOBASE
- GeoRef
- INIS Atomindex
- Science Citation Index Expanded
- Scopus

According to the Journal Citation Reports, the journal has a 2012 impact factor of 1.417.
