= Queensland Government Mining Journal =

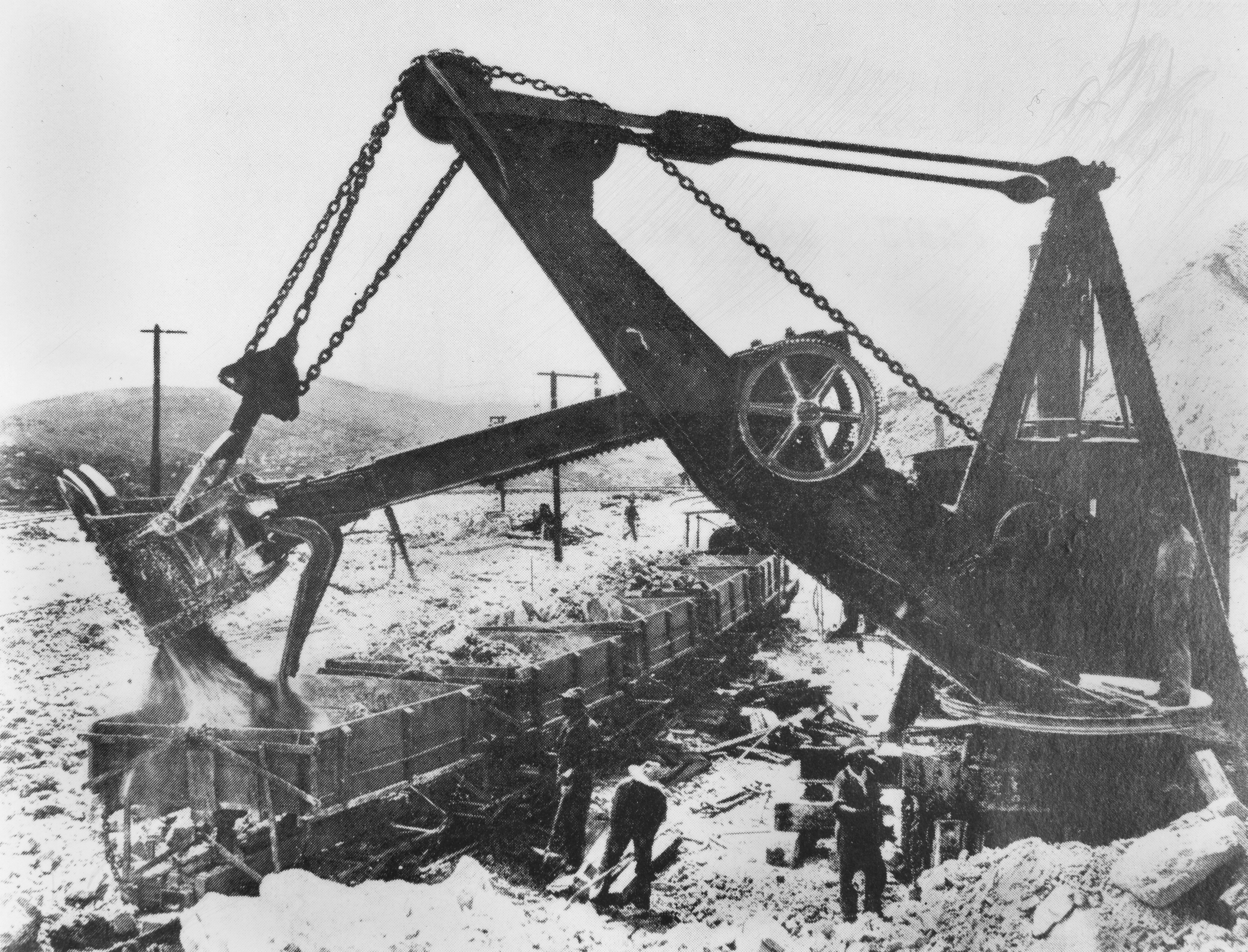
Large shovel working at the open cut mine Mt. Morgan ca. 1906, appeared in the June 1950 issue

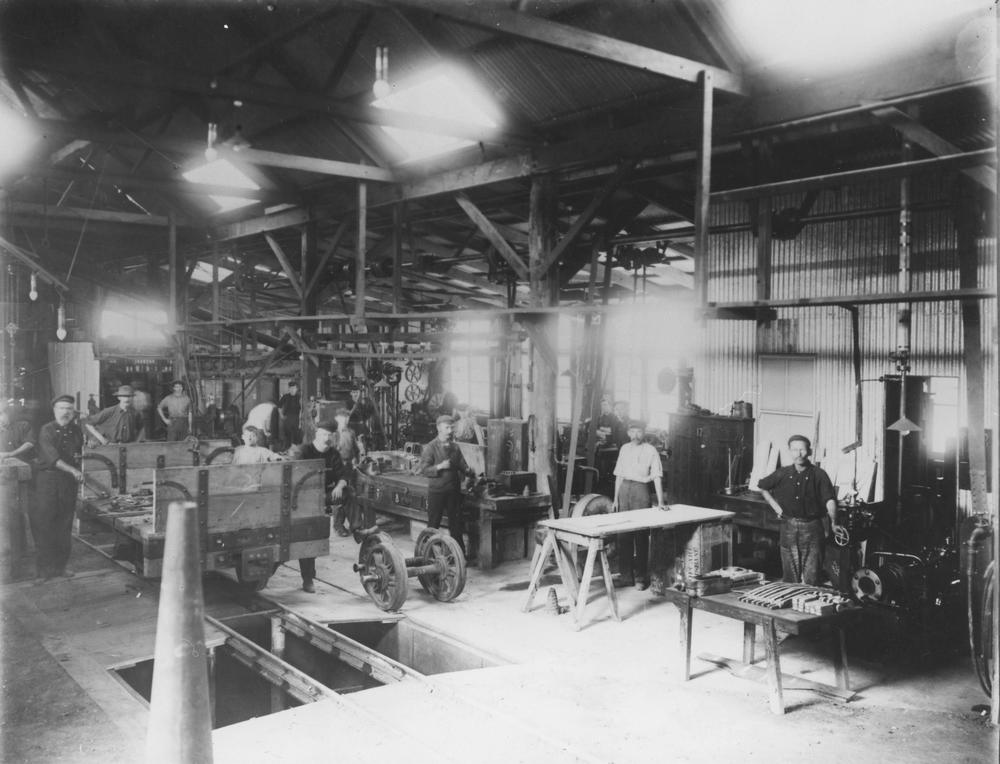
Irvinebank Company's tin treatment works, appeared in the July 1909 issue

The Queensland Government Mining Journal is a trade magazine about mining published monthly by the Queensland Government in Australia.

== History ==
In April 1900 it was announced that the Queensland Government would be publishing a monthly mining journal under the editorship of William Hodgkinson, whose previous experience included exploration, journalism, gold mining and politics (including being the Minister for Mines from 1888 to 1893). Its first issue appeared in June 1900, having been printed at the Queensland Government Printing Office. Despite being a publication of the Queensland Government, the journal's second issue in July 1900 criticised the government over issues of mine safety.

Hodgkinson died in late July and the editorship passed to Walter John Morley who produced the August 1900 issue.

== Today ==
As at 2016, the Queensland Government Mining Journal continues to be published in a quarterly electronic format, freely available via email subscription or downloaded via the Internet. It is Australia's longest-running mining publication.
