= Kingower =

- Town
- Coordinates: 36°36′31″S 143°45′18″E
- Country: Australia
- State: Victoria
- LGA: Shire of Loddon
- Established: 1853

Government
  - State electorate: Ripon
  - Federal division: Mallee

Population
  - Total: 46 (2021 census)
- Postcode: 3517

Kingower is a locality in the Shire of Loddon, Victoria, Australia, located on Inglewood-Rheola Road. At the 2021 census, Kingower had a population of 46.

== History ==
The Kingower goldfield was discovered in August 1853 by Captain John Mechosk and his party of 11 hired men. The discovery resulted in a rush of about 4000 diggers as the field became famous for unearthing monster nuggets.

In August 1857, Robert and James Ambrose and Samuel and Charles Napier discovered the Blanche Barkly nugget, at that time the world's largest gold nugget, weighing in at 1743 ounces. The Blanche Barkly remains the third largest gold nugget ever discovered to this day.

The discovery of the nearby Inglewood goldfield drained Kingower of most of its population in 1859. From then onward, only a small number of diggers continued "working the field," despite large nuggets still being unearthed from time to time.

In 1980, Kevin Hillier was fossicking in the forest behind the old Kingower school house when he came across the 875 ounce 'Hand of Faith' nugget. The nugget was sold to the Golden Nugget Casino in Las Vegas for over US$1 million and remains the largest nugget still in existence in the world today, and the largest ever found with a metal detector.

== The locality today ==
The locality is bordered by Kooyoora State Park, home of rare Box-Ironbark forest, scenic granite outcrops and significant Aboriginal sites. Melville Caves, a collection of granite tors which form fissures (loosely called 'caves'), is located in the park. The bushranger Captain Melville is rumoured to have used the caves as a hideout in the 1850s.

Historic buildings that remain in Kingower include the Bridge Hotel, Kingower Schoolhouse, St Mary's Church and Glenalbyn Grange, the original homestead for the Glenalbyn pastoral run. On the old Cobb & Co route from Dunolly to Wedderburn remain an historic bridge, the earliest civil construction remaining in the area, and water wells used for Cobb & Co horses. Across the track are the workings of the old Union Reef Mine.

A bush cricket ground is the home of the Kingower Cricket Club.
