= Geological Society of Australia =

Australian non-profit

The Geological Society of Australia (GSA) was established as a non-profit organisation in 1952 to promote, advance and support earth sciences in Australia. The founding chairperson was Edwin Sherbon Hills.

William Rowan Browne was a founder of the society and was president 1955–56.

Year	Name of President
1952–1955	Edwin Sherbon Hills
1955–1956	William Rowan Browne
1956–1958	A. R. Alderman
1959–1961	R. T. Prider
1961–1962	N. H. Fisher
1962–1964	Owen A. Jones
1964–1965	Alan Knox Denmead
1964–1965	J. A. Dulhunty
1965–1967	Maxwell R. Banks
1967–1968	F. Canavan
1968–1969	Nelly Hooper Ludbrook
1969–1971	A. F. Trendall
1971–1973	D.A Brown
1973–1975	Dorothy Hill
1975–1977	G.M. Philip
1977–1978	Sam W. Carey
1978–1980	J. F. Lovering
1980–1981	C. D. Branch
1981–1983	R. D. Gee
1983–1984	M. J. Rickard
1984–1986	J. B. Waterhouse
1986–1988	D. M. Boyd
1988–1990	I. R. Johnson
1990–1992	D. H. Green
1992–1994	P. J. Legge
1994–1996	David Groves
1996–1998	D. Denham
1998–2000	R. A. Henderson
2000–2002	E. C. Leitch
2002–2004	J. D. Foden
2004–2006	A. J. Crawford
2006–2008	A. J. Gleadow
2008–2010	Peter Cawood
2010–2012	Brad Pillans
2012–2014	Laurie Hutton
2014–2016	Graham Carr
2016–2018	Caroline Forbes
2018–2020	Jo Parr
2020–2023	Pete Betts
2023–2025	Amber Jarrett

== Publications ==
- Australian Journal of Earth Sciences (AJES) – official journal of the GSA, eight issues per year
- The Australian Geologist (TAG) – quarterly magazine that includes technical and special features, society news, conference details, regular reports, book reviews and news from Australia's geoscience sector
- Alcheringa – quarterly publication of the Australasian Association of Palaeontologists Specialist Group (published through Taylor & Francis)
- Geoz – the GSA's electronic bulletin
