= California State Mining and Mineral Museum =

Museum in Mariposa, California, United States

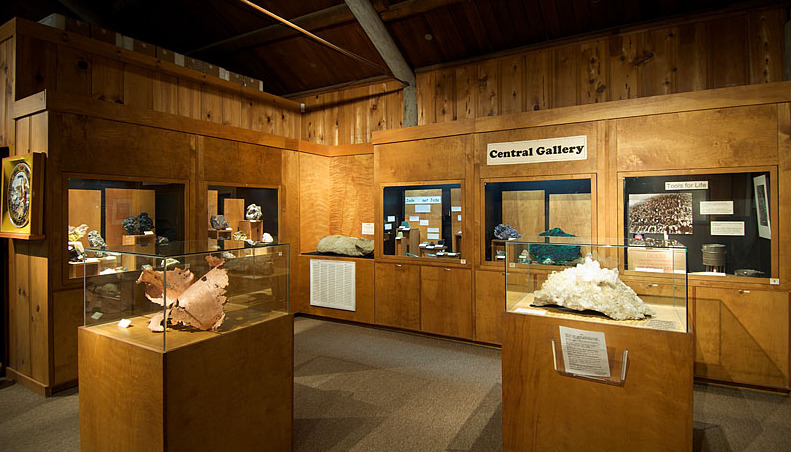
- Interior of the California State Mining and Mineral Museum

- Location within California Location within the United States
- Location: Mariposa County, California, United States
- Nearest city: Mariposa, California
- Coordinates: 37°27′51″N 119°56′51″W
- Established: 1999
- Governing body: California Department of Parks and Recreation

The California State Mining and Mineral Museum exhibits and interprets the state's mineral resources and mining heritage. It is part of the California state park system, and is located near Mariposa, a town in central California, on the premises of the Mariposa County fairgrounds.

The museum houses a collection that was created in 1880, with the establishment of the California State Mining Bureau. Henry G. Hanks was the first California State Mineralogist and was tasked with managing the collection. The collection was housed in the Ferry Building in San Francisco until 1983. The collection was moved at the Mariposa County Fairgrounds in 1986. Responsibility for it was transferred from the California Department of Conservation to the California Department of Parks & Recreation in 1999. It is the only California State Park without associated land. The international collection holds over 13,000 minerals, rocks, gems, fossils, and historic artifacts.

== Popular exhibits ==
Exhibits include the crystalline gold Fricot Nugget, weighing 201 troy ounces (6.25 kg), the largest found during the California Gold Rush; a working scale model of a stamp mill over 100 years old, demonstrating the process of extracting gold from quartz rock; and a replica hard rock mine tunnel that allows visitors to better understand California's hard rock mines.

The California State Mining and Mineral Museum has artifacts from the Mother Lode, along with international gems, stones, and other artifacts.

== Closure proposal ==
The California Mining and Mineral Museum was one of the 48 California state parks proposed for closure in January 2008 during the Arnold Schwarzenegger Administration as part of a deficit reduction program.

== Theft ==
On October 1, 2012, thieves stole an estimated $2 million in gold and gems, but were unable to take the Fricot Nugget. Five men were arrested, but the stolen items had not been recovered as of early 2022.
