= Spender (surname) =

Spender is a surname. Notable people with the name include:

- Dale Spender (1943–2023), Australian feminist and writer
- Elizabeth Spender, English film actress
- Emily Spender, English novelist
- Humphrey Spender (1910–2005), British photographer, painter and designer
- Jeffrey Spender (judge), Australian judge
- Jérémy Spender (born 1982), French footballer
- John Spender (1935–2022), Australian politician and barrister
- John Alfred Spender (1862–1942), British journalist and newspaper editor
- Lillian Spender (1835–1895), English novelist
- Mary Spender (born 1990), British singer-songwriter, guitarist and YouTube personality
- Matthew Spender (1945–2026), English sculptor and writer
- Michael Spender (1906–1945), English explorer
- Nancy Spender (1909–2001), English painter
- Natasha Spender (1919–2010), English pianist and author
- Percy Spender (1897–1985), Australian politician, diplomat and jurist
- Philip Spender (born 1943), English public-sector fundraiser
- Simon Spender (born 1985), Welsh footballer
- Stephen Spender (1909–1995), British poet, novelist and essayist
- Wilfrid Spender (1876–1960), British army officer
- Herbert Henry Spender-Clay (1875–1937), English soldier and Conservative Party politician

Fictional

- C.G.B. Spender, fictional character in the American television series The X-Files
- Cassandra Spender, fictional character in The X-Files
- Freddie Spender, fictional detective in the British television series Spender
- Jeffrey Spender, fictional character in The X-Files
