= Heron Island Research Station =

Marine research station

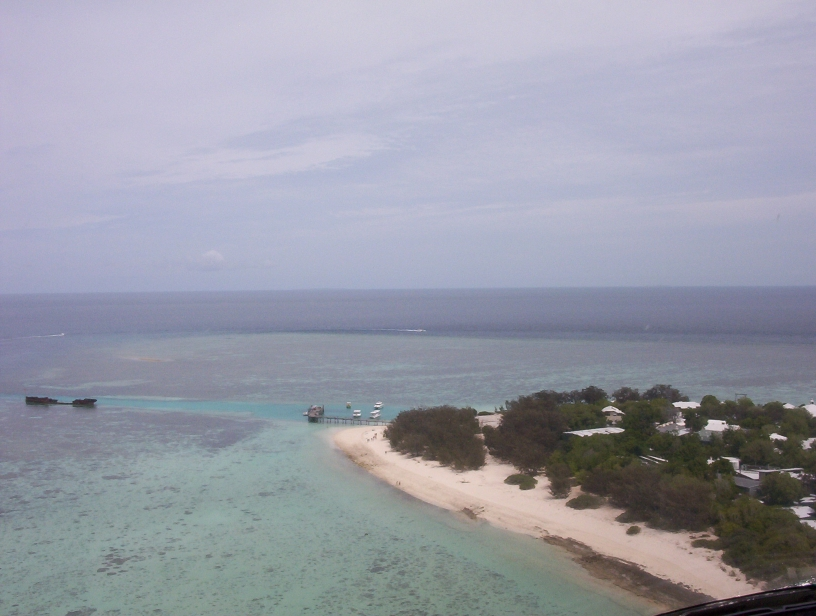
Heron Island Research Station, Heron Island

Heron Island Research Station is a marine research station located on Heron Island, an island within the Great Barrier Reef Marine Park, 80 km from Gladstone, off the coast of Queensland, Australia. It is located at the leeward end of a coral cay on a 10 x 5 kilometre platform reef. Although the island had been used as a turtle cannery in the 1920s, after this was abandoned, it was taken over as a resort in the 1930s, by Captain Christian Poulsen. A number of researchers travelled to the island from the 1930s using the resort facilities. The island became a National Park in 1943, and following the end of World War II, saw the first groups of university students from the University of Queensland arrive. Today the island is divided into three sections - the resort, research station and National Park.

== Origins of the research station ==
The origins of the research station exist within the Great Barrier Reef Committee, which was established in 1922 by UQ's first Professor of Geology, Henry C. Richards and Sir Matthew Nathan, then Governor of Queensland. Nathan, Richards and a group of like minded academics and politicians from Australia and overseas, wanted to promote the need for original research, debate and exploration of the Great Barrier Reef within politics, the university and scientific community and in newspapers and public addresses. A bore drill of the reef was undertaken with funding from the Committee in 1926 at Michaelmas Cay. The committee helped to fund a major expedition in 1928-1929 by the Great Barrier Reef (Yonge) expedition to Low Isles reef, north of Cairns to research the zoological, botanical and geomorphological importance of the Great Barrier Reef with the support of the Queensland government. The results of the Yonge expedition, which yielded a number of reports were published by the British Museum of Natural History (now Natural History Museum) and generated worldwide interest. In 1929, the Australian government was being lobbied to establish a marine institute or a number of research stations on the east coast of Australia. It was hoped that the structures that had been built for the Yonge expedition on Low Isles reef would be suitable as a longer term solution, but these were destroyed by a cyclone in 1934. A further geographical expedition occurred in 1936, and in 1937 another bore drill was conducted at Heron Island. Support for the preservation and conservation of the reef had also been growing.

Professor Ernest Goddard from the School of Zoology at the University of Queensland had been recommending the establishment of a marine biology research station in Queensland since his arrival at the university in 1923. A number of islands were proposed for such a station including Palm or Dunk Island in 1929. The Great Barrier Reef Committee and the university had reservations about establishing a research station because of the ongoing funding it would require during the Depression, and because of competitive interests within the committee which sought a broader scope of study in multiple reef locations.

With the outbreak of World War II, much of the impetus of the Great Barrier Reef Committee's program was halted. Sir Matthew Nathan returned to England and died in 1939. Prof. Richards suffered a heart attack in 1945 and would later die in 1947, resulting in a changeover in the leadership of the Great Barrier Reef Committee. Prof. Goddard also died suddenly on Heron Island in 1948, on the eve of his retirement from the university. He had intended to make the island his home and conduct marine biology research there. After Goddard's death, a fund was set up to establish a research station on Heron island in his honour and this objective was eventually fulfilled.

In 1950, the Great Barrier Reef Committee, then under the supervision of Dr Edward Oswald (Ted) Marks (chairman), Dr Dorothy Hill (research secretary) and Dr O.A. Jones (treasurer), applied for a lease of a portion of the island to undertake scientific research. Secretary of the Committee, Dr Dorothy Hill was able to obtain materials to construct the first buildings for the new research facility on the southern end of the island in 1951, with construction starting in 1952. Hill was able to secure assistance in the transport of materials to the Island from vessels taking tourists to the Island's resort. For the years 1951-1970 the Great Barrier Reef Committee would oversee the station.

== Facilities at the station ==
After a number of troubles with the administration and funding of the Station in the mid 1950s, very basic accommodation was established on the island. It had a laboratory, but no equipment. This lab could also double as sleeping quarters in the short term. Longer term, it was hoped that the lab would be equipped, and a dormitory, kitchen and aquaria be constructed. After investigation by the Rockefeller Foundation in 1957, the University of Queensland eventually provided funds for maintenance of the station on a more permanent basis from 1965. This economic security resulted in huge growth in the number of students visiting the Station from Australia and overseas to study biology, geology and botany. In 1965, discussions began to transfer the Station to joint ownership with the university, and after five years of debate and negotiation, an agreement was signed in 1970. Much research was undertaken from the Station in the 1960s regarding the plague of Crown of Thorns starfish, led by Dr Robert Endean. Roche Pharmaceuticals had an arrangement with the Station from 1973-1981 to conduct preliminary research and examination of drugs derived from marine organisms, and they later donated all their equipment to the Station in 1981 when they closed their Australian operations. Other marine biology stations opened in Queensland as well - Lizard Island (run by the Australian Museum), Orpheus Island (James Cook University) and One Tree Island (University of Sydney), as well as the Moreton Bay Research Station (University of Queensland) at Dunwich on North Stradbroke Island.

Full ownership of the Station was transferred to the University of Queensland from 1980. While facilities were fairly rudimentary, unlike other research stations around the world, it had the advantage of being metres from the reef it studied. Without the initial outlay of funding from the Great Barrier Reef Committee in setting up the station - no easy feat when it was so remote from the mainland, and without fresh water and power, the Station would most likely never have been established so modestly.

In 2007, the research station was affected by a serious fire. Research laboratories and a number of facilities were destroyed, as well as student accommodation and the teaching labs. Despite the ruined buildings and the consequent reconstruction, researchers and students continued to come to the station.

The new facilities opened in 2009, with space for up to 150 visitors in the lab and teaching rooms.

== Habitat ==
The island is a significant nesting location for two vulnerable turtle species, the Green Turtle (Chelonia mydas) and Loggerhead Turtle (Caretta caretta). The dominant vegetation is Pisonia grandis forest. The forested area and surrounding dunes, provide a nesting sanctuary for thousands of migrant and resident birds each year.

== Programs ==
Today the station is the oldest and largest marine research station on the Great Barrier Reef. It specialises in marine research, climate change research and student training in marine sciences. It is a cornerstone of the Australian Research Council (ARC)'s Centre of Excellence in Coral Reef Studies.

== Media ==
In 2014, Sir David Attenborough and Atlantic Productions, filmed segments of their Great Barrier Reef production at the research station.
