= 1928 Great Barrier Reef expedition =

1928 Australian Great Barrier Reef expedition

The 1928 Great Barrier Reef expedition, also known as the Yonge Expedition or the Low Isles Expedition, was a thirteen-month scientific program beginning in 1928, which was promoted to study the Australian Great Barrier Reef.

== Origins ==
The Great Barrier Reef Expedition was a scientific study suggested by Sir Matthew Nathan and Professor Henry Richards who led the Australian Great Barrier Reef Committee from its establishment in 1922. With support from the British Barrier Reef Committee and the Association for the Advancement of Science in England, there was considerable interest in conducting zoological studies of Australia's Great Barrier Reef, to investigate theories put forward by Charles Darwin and others. It was also planned to determine the economic importance of the reef's marine life. This largely British expedition of scientists sought financial support from the Australian government, universities and the public to fund the expedition and study biological and geological life in a number of sections of the Reef.

== Personnel ==
C. Maurice Yonge, a marine invertebrate researcher, was encouraged to join a proposed expedition to Australia's Great Barrier Reef in 1927. He was eventually appointed its leader. Twelve scientists including Yonge, his wife Dr Mattie Yonge who would act as medical officer, as well as Frederick Russell, a naturalist with the Marine Biological Association in Plymouth and his wife Gweneth, Dr Andrew Orr and Dr Sheina Marshall, naturalists at Millport Marine Laboratory, Dr Thomas Stephenson, lecturer in zoology at University of London and his wife Anne, Geoffrey Tandy a botanist with the Natural History Museum who would collect marine plants and animals joined the expedition.

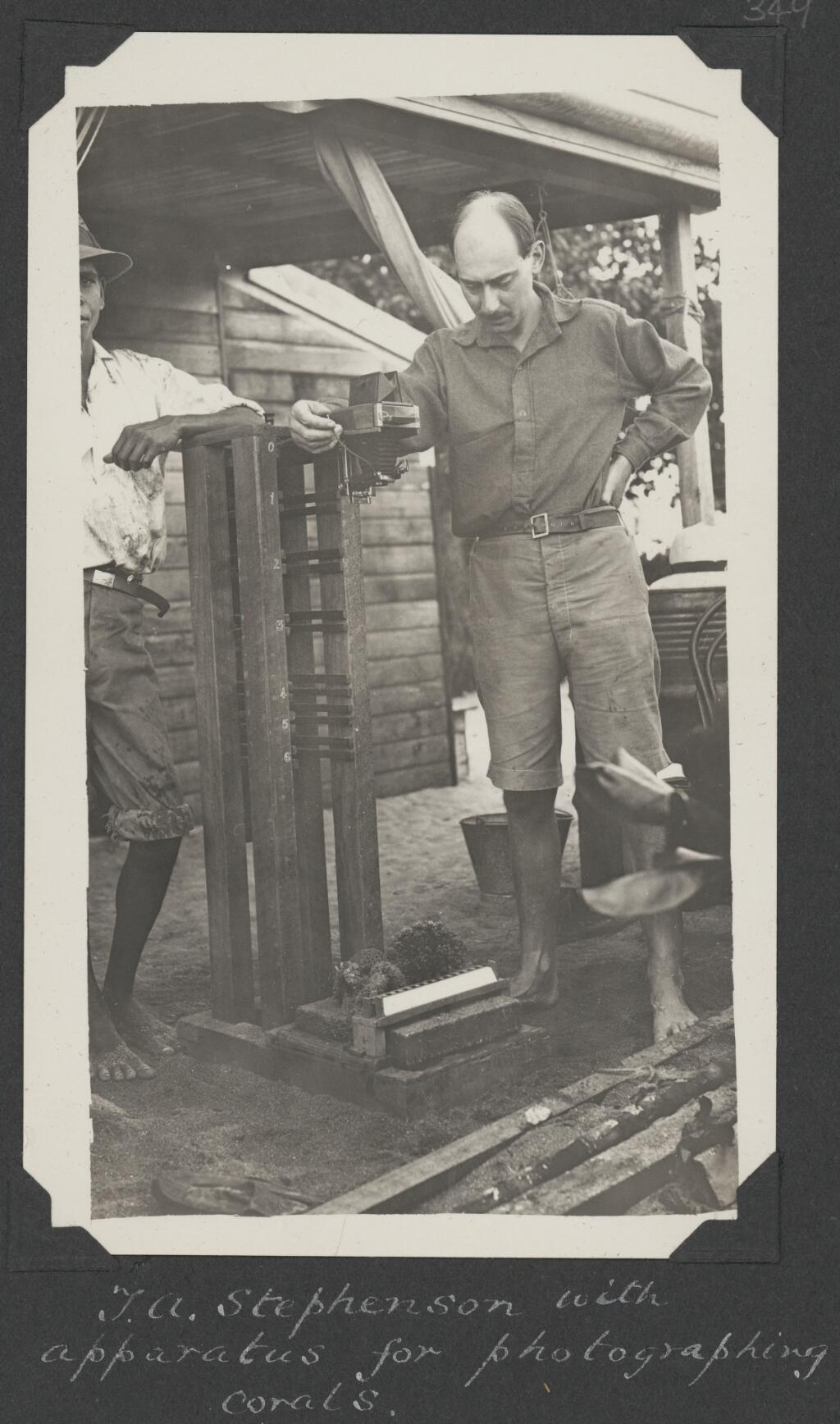
Thomas Stephenson with apparatus for photographing corals, Low Islands, Queensland, circa 1928 - C.M. Yonge (26544167848)

Others included James Steers, lecturer in geomorphology who acted as the expedition's surveyor. He was assisted by Michael Spender and E.C. Marchant. G.W. Otter and Aubrey Nicholls would be assistants, and Frank Moorhouse of the University of Queensland would provide local marine biology knowledge. They arrived at the two islands of Low Isles on 16 July 1928 and encamped there for thirteen months. Sidnie Manton and Elizabeth Fraser would join the expedition for four months and work with the shore party. The expedition was unique in its inclusion of female researchers.

The Australian Museum also sent five people to help with the research throughout the year – Tom Iredale, Gilbert Whitley, William Boardman, Arthur Livingstone and Frank McNeill. Indigenous workers were hired from the nearby Anglican mission at Yarrabah to work on Low Isles in support of the team. They included Andy and Grace Dabah who worked as handyman and cook and were later replaced by Claude and Minnie Connolly. The children of the Dabah and Connolly families also lived with their parents during the time they supported the expedition. Harry Mossman and Paul Sexton from Yarrabah were hired as crew on the research vessel Luana. The Luana was used to carry out scientific studies on and in the water as well as carry provisions to and from the mainland.

The expedition was divided into four parts. Researchers investigated ocean conditions, taking hydrographic measurements, recording meteorological and tidal data and monitored plankton. They observed the growth rate of the corals and the marine life around it. They collected specimens including plankton as well as conducting dredging and trawling around the reef. Trochus shell was collected and studied and at the time a trochus farming industry was proposed. Black-Lip pearl oysters, Beche De Mer and rock and mangrove oysters, as well as the fish populations of the surrounding areas were assessed for potential economic development. Other studies considered a sardine fishing industry for the region and the turtle industry of Heron Island, near Gladstone. Boring of the reef had been undertaken around Michaelmas Cay in 1926 to determine the age and thickness of the reef, which helped the geological research.

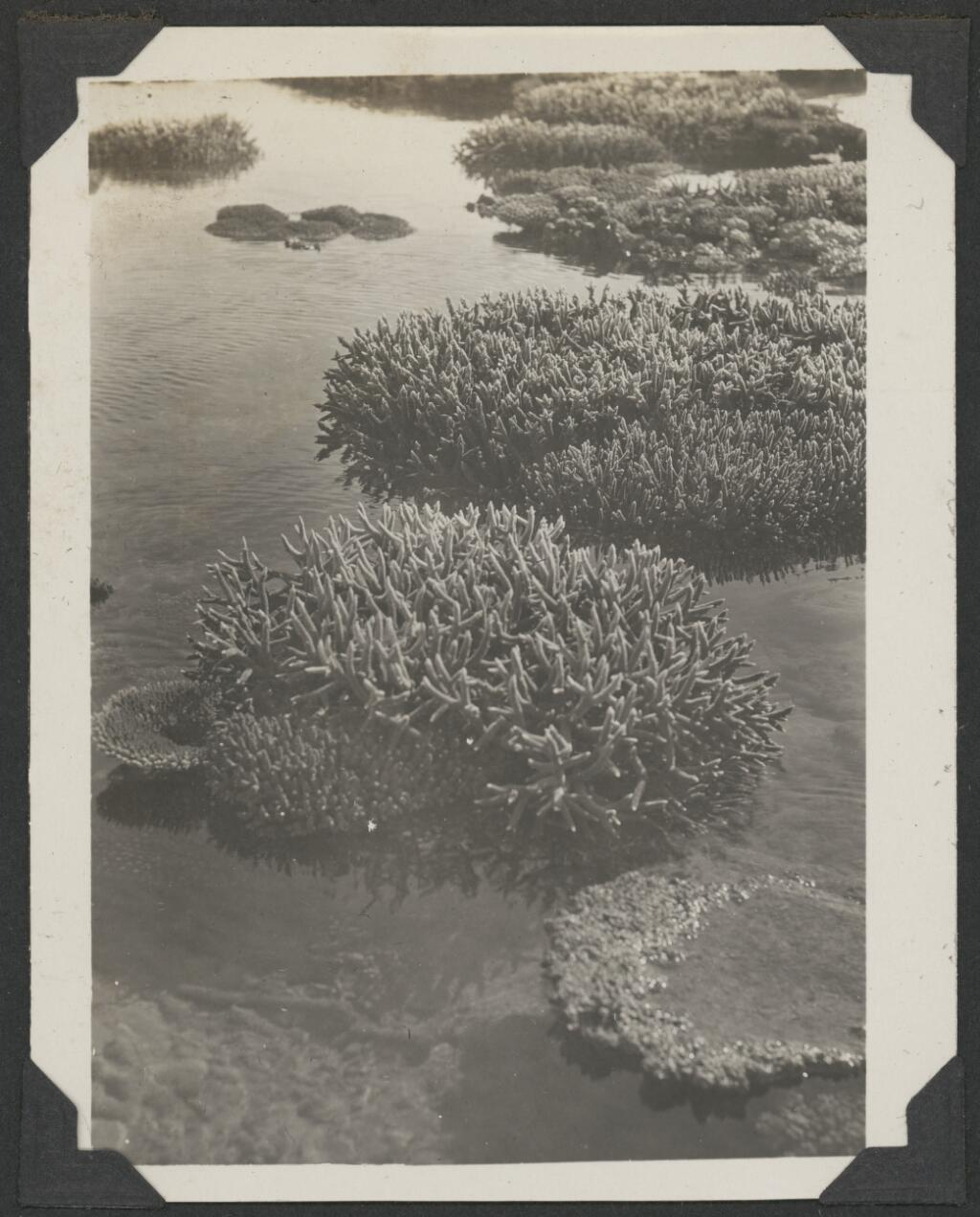
Exposed coral near the anchorage, Low Islands, Queensland, ca. 1928, 1 - C.M. Yonge (37190980776)

== Outcomes of the expedition ==
The scientific discoveries of the expedition were well reported in the press during 1928–1929. One of the first visitors to Low Isles during the Expedition was journalist Charles Barrett whose newspaper articles were later published as a book. The expedition itself published seven volumes of scientific material in addition to articles in scholarly journals. Maurice Yonge also published a book aimed at a general audience – A year on the Great Barrier Reef (1930).

In part due to the extensive newspaper coverage, tourists sought out the islands following the expedition to collect shells and corals. This collecting for scientific and private collections was so extreme that the island was ‘virtually swept clean’.

Yonge and his team's research pioneered studies into coral physiology and their research persists in being vital reference material to current study.

== Subsequent expeditions ==
In 1968 a Belgian expedition to the reef was undertaken. In 1973, a Royal Society and Universities of Queensland Expedition was undertaken to the northern part of the reef.
