= Quadrifoliovarium quattuordecim =

Scientific classification
- Kingdom: Animalia
- Phylum: Platyhelminthes
- Class: Trematoda
- Order: Plagiorchiida
- Family: Bunocotylidae
- Genus: Quadrifoliovarium
- Species: Q. quattuordecim

Binomial name
- Quadrifoliovarium quattuordecim Chambers & Cribb, 2006

Species of digenean

Quadrifoliovarium quattuordecim is a species of digenean in the subfamily Quadrifoliovariinae and a parasite of the fish Naso tonganus. It was formally described in 2006 and is known from the waters near Heron Island, Queensland, Australia.

== Taxonomy and etymology ==
The species was described by Clinton Chambers and Thomas Cribb in 2006. They gave it the specific name quattuordecim (14 in Latin) because it can have up to 14 lobes on the vitellarium (yolk-producing gland). The type locality is the waters of Heron Island and the type host is Naso tonganus.

== Description ==
On average, Quadrifoliovarium quattuordecim is 3.187 milimeters long and 0.238 milimeters wide, with a depth of 0.252 milimeters. The club-shaped lobes of the vitellarium number 13 to 14 and are split into two even groups, with one in front of and one behind the ovary.

It is most similar to Quadrifoliovarium simplex, but differs in the number of lobes on the vitellarium.
