= J. A. Spender =

J. A. Spender CH DL JP
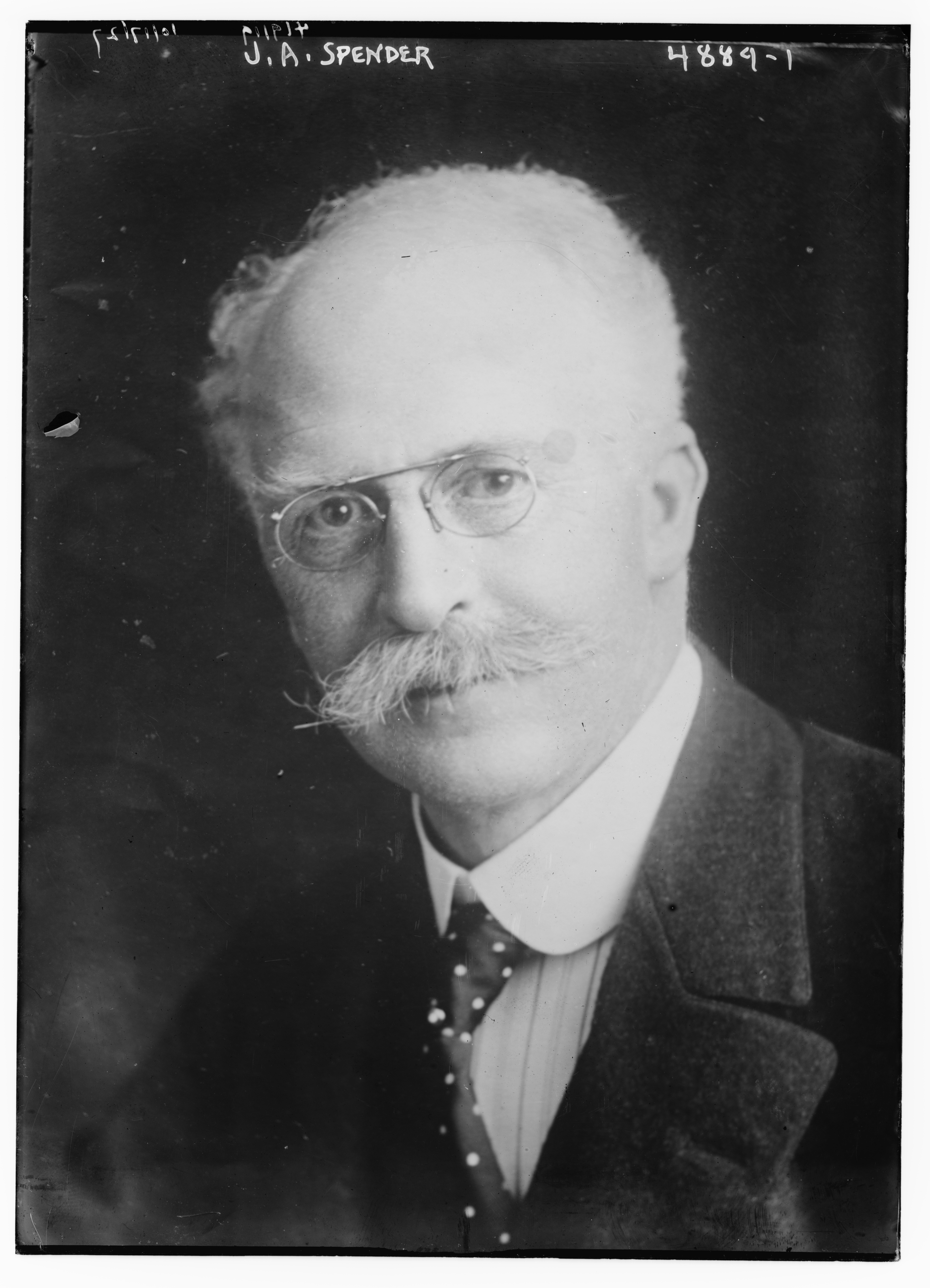
- Born: John Alfred Spender; 23 December 1862; Bath, Somerset, England
- Died: 21 June 1942 (aged 79); Bromley, Kent, England
- Education: Balliol College, Oxford
- Occupations: Journalist, editor, and author
- Spouse: Mary Rawlinson (1868–1942)
- Relatives: Harold Spender (brother); Stephen Spender (nephew)

John Alfred Spender CH DL JP (23 December 1862 – 21 June 1942) was a British journalist and author. He also edited the London newspaper The Westminster Gazette from 1896 to 1922.

== Early life ==
Spender was the eldest of four sons born to John Kent Spender, a doctor, and his wife, the novelist Lillian Spender. He was educated at Bath College and Balliol College, Oxford, where he did well in his studies but missed a first in Greats because of illness.

== Editor ==
Though Benjamin Jowett, the Master of Balliol, suggested for Spender to become a lawyer, Spender sought out a career in journalism instead and he had the assistance of his uncle, William Saunders, who owned the Western Morning News and Eastern Morning News as well as the Central News Agency. After a brief period as Saunders's secretary, Spender was offered a position as a leader writer for The Echo by John Passmore Edwards, but their relationship proved difficult and Spender left after only five months in the post. In 1886 Saunders offered his nephew the editorship of the struggling Hull newspaper Eastern Morning News. Spender eagerly accepted and spent a little more than four years in the post. As the editor of a provincial daily, Spender undertook whatever jobs were necessary: sales manager, leader writer, reporter and critic. His efforts returned the paper to profitability, but it was sold by Saunders in February 1891. Spender returned to London, where he worked as a freelance contributor to a number of papers and wrote his first book, a tract on old-age pensions that won him the friendship of John Morley.

In June 1892 Spender received an offer from Edward Tyas Cook, the editor of the Liberal evening newspaper the Pall Mall Gazette, to work as his assistant editor. Spender gladly accepted, only to be let go a month later after it was sold to William Waldorf Astor, who changed its party allegiance to the Unionists. Though the newly-married Spender was unemployed once more, he was quickly rehired by Cook when he started a new Liberal evening paper, The Westminster Gazette, in January 1893.

=== Editorship of The Westminster Gazette ===
Cook served as editor until 1896, when he resigned his position to take over as editor of the Liberal The Daily News. Though a number of prominent individuals applied to succeed him, the owner of The Westminster Gazette, George Newnes, decided to offer the editorship to Spender, then only 33. Spender himself was modest about his prospects, but his selection was met with approval by many in the Liberal ranks, including leader Lord Rosebery.

Under Spender's direction, The Westminster Gazette never had a wide circulation nor made a profit. Nonetheless, it was the most influential evening newspaper in Britain, and Spender received the credit. Veteran editor Frederick Greenwood regarded The Westminster Gazette under Spender as "the best edited paper in London" and his leaders became essential reading for politicians on both sides of the political aisle.

His priority was Liberal unity, and he balanced ideological expression in the pages of his paper, avoiding the polemical heights attained by his counterparts in other Liberal publications. That occasionally earned him the ire of both Liberal factions in a debate, but his loyalty to the Liberal leadership was rewarded with their confidences, which provided him with invaluable insight into the inner workings of contemporary politics.

Spender greatly valued his editorial independence, which was never an issue with Newnes. When the latter sold the paper in 1908 to a consortium of Liberal businessmen and politicians, led by Alfred Mond, however, Spender found his cherished independence under pressure. Only internal disagreement within the consortium saved Spender from dismissal. The dispute hurt staff morale, and the start of the First World War led several important staff members to leave for service in the armed forces.

A growing decline in circulation and revenue led Spender and the owners to undertake the radical move of switching from an evening to a morning publication in November 1921. The new paper, however, was no longer a vehicle for the sort of reflective journalism characteristic of Spender, who resigned in February 1922.

== Later life ==
Spender's departure from The Westminster Gazette also meant his departure from journalism, as he now pursued a new career as an author. Over the next two decades, he wrote a number of books on nonfiction subjects, including histories, travelogues, biographies and memoirs. His most prominent works were two biographies of Liberal Party Prime Ministers Henry Campbell-Bannerman and H. H. Asquith and a memoir of his Life Journalism and Politics. He also served on a number of public commissions and inquiries, and after refusing public honours three previous times, he accepted an appointment as a Member of the Order of the Companions of Honour (CH) in the 1937 Coronation Honours, for services to literature and journalism.

Spender was also a Justice of the peace (JP) and was appointed Deputy lieutenant of the County of London (DL) in 1929.

He also remained involved in Liberal politics, but his influence was much diminished with the decline of the Liberal Party in the interwar period. His concern about the insufficiency of British armaments led many to brand Spender as an appeaser before the Second World War, or otherwise to praise him for his able defence of Neville Chamberlain's policy. Spender died in June 1942 after a long illness.

== Works ==
- The State and Pensions in Old Age (1892)
- The Comments of Bagshot (1908)
- The Life of The Right Hon. Sir Henry Campbell-Bannerman (2 vols.) (1924)
- The Public Life (2 vols.) (1925)
- Life, Journalism and Politics (2 vols.) (1927)
- (with Cyril Asquith) Life of Herbert Henry Asquith, Lord Oxford and Asquith (2 vols.) (1932)
- The Changing East (Pocket Edition 1935)
- New lamps and ancient lights (1940)
- Last Essays (1944)
- Men and things (1968)

== Sources ==
- Brack, Duncan, ed. (1998). "J. A. Spender". Dictionary of Liberal Biography. London: Politico's Publishing. pp. 337–339. ISBN 1902301099.
- Morris, A. J. A. (2004). "Spender, John Alfred". In Matthew, H.C.G.; Harrison, Brian (eds.). The Oxford Dictionary of National Biography. Vol. 51. Oxford: Oxford University Press. pp. 900–902.
- Koss, Stephen (1981). The Nineteenth Century. The Rise and Fall of the Political Press in Britain. Vol. 1. Chapel Hill, NC: University of North Carolina Press. ISBN 0807814830.
- Koss, Stephen (1984). The Twentieth Century Test. The Rise and Fall of the Political Press in Britain. Vol. 2. Chapel Hill, NC: University of North Carolina Press. ISBN 0807815985.

Media offices
Preceded by Edward Tyas Cook	Editor of the Westminster Gazette; 1896–1921	Succeeded by J. B. Hobman
Party political offices
Preceded by Donald Maclean	President of the National Liberal Federation; 1926–1927	Succeeded by Charles Hobhouse
