= The Westminster Gazette =

Former newspaper published in London

- Type: Daily
- Format: Broadsheet
- Owner(s): George Newnes (1893–1908); Alfred Mond (1908–c. 1921); Weetman Pearson, 1st Viscount Cowdray (c. 1921–1928)
- Editor: E. T. Cook (1893–1896); J. A. Spender (1896–1921); J. B. Hobman (1921–1928)
- Founded: 31 January 1893
- Political alignment: Liberal
- Language: English
- Ceased publication: 31 January 1928
- Headquarters: London, England
- Circulation: 20,000

The Westminster Gazette was an influential Liberal newspaper based in London. It was known for publishing sketches and short stories, including early works by Raymond Chandler, Anthony Hope, D. H. Lawrence, Katherine Mansfield, Margaret Chute and Saki, and travel writing by Rupert Brooke. One of its editors was caricaturist and political cartoonist Francis Carruthers Gould. The paper was dubbed the "pea-green incorruptible" – Prime Minister William Ewart Gladstone having personally approved its green colour.

Launched with the help of Liberal publisher George Newnes, the paper was started by E. T. Cook on 31 January 1893, employing the core of the old political staff from The Pall Mall Gazette including Hulda Friederichs. The paper established itself in the front rank of Liberal publications, earning the admiration of the Liberal prime minister Lord Rosebery.

Cook served as editor until 1896, when he resigned his position to take over as editor of the Liberal The Daily News. Though a number of prominent individuals applied to succeed him, George Newnes decided to offer the editorship to J. A. Spender, then only 33 years of age. Though Spender himself was modest about his prospects, his selection was met with approval by many in the Liberal ranks, including the head of the party Lord Rosebery.

When launched, it was printed on green paper (which it retained throughout its time as an evening publication), intended to make it easier to read by homegoing workers under artificial light on a train or omnibus.

The veteran editor Frederick Greenwood regarded The Westminster Gazette under Spender as "the best-edited paper in London," and it became essential reading for politicians on both sides of the political aisle. The paper's priority was Liberal unity. It balanced ideological expression, avoiding the polemical heights attained by other Liberal publications. Though this occasionally earned Spender the ire of both Liberal factions in a debate, his loyalty to the Liberal leadership was rewarded with their confidences, which provided him with invaluable insight into the inner workings of contemporary politics.

Spender greatly valued his editorial independence, which was never an issue with The Gazette's owner, George Newnes. When Newnes sold the paper in 1908 to a consortium of Liberal businessmen and politicians led by Alfred Mond, however, Spender found his cherished independence under pressure. Only internal disagreement within the ownership group saved Spender from dismissal. The dispute hurt staff morale, while the start of the First World War led several important staff members to leave for service in the armed forces.

A growing decline in circulation and revenue led Spender and the owners, including the leading shareholder at the time Weetman Pearson, 1st Viscount Cowdray, to undertake the radical move of switching from an evening to a morning publication in November 1921.The new paper, however, was no longer a vehicle for the sort of reflective journalism characteristic of Spender, and he resigned from his position in February 1922.

The revamped newspaper gained circulation but continued to make significant financial losses. It was merged into the Liberal Daily News on 1 February 1928.

== Editors ==
- 1893: Edward Tyas Cook
- 1896: J. A. Spender
- 1921: J. B. Hobman

== Sources ==
- Morris, A. J. A. (2004). "Spender, John Alfred". In Matthew, H.C.G.; Harrison, Brian (eds.). The Oxford Dictionary of National Biography. Vol. 51. Oxford: Oxford University Press. pp. 900–902.
- Koss, Stephen (1981). The Nineteenth Century. The Rise and Fall of the Political Press in Britain. Vol. 1. Chapel Hill, NC: University of North Carolina Press. ISBN 0807814830.
- Koss, Stephen (1984). The Twentieth Century Test. The Rise and Fall of the Political Press in Britain. Vol. 2. Chapel Hill, NC: University of North Carolina Press. ISBN 0807815985.
