= Harold Spender =

British politician, author, and journalist

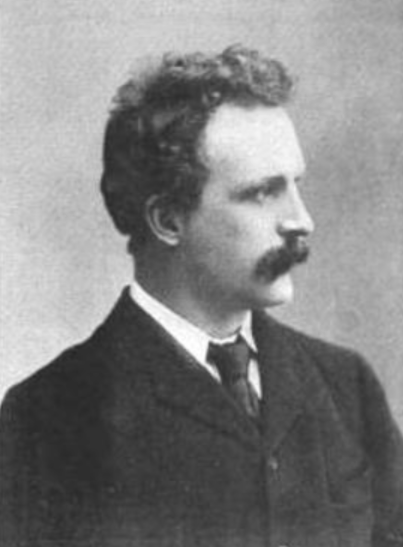
In The Sketch, 1 January 1896

Edward Harold Spender (22 June 1864 – 15 April 1926) was a British Liberal Party politician, author, journalist and lecturer.

== Background ==
He was the son of Dr John Kent Spender and his wife Lillian Spender, and John Alfred Spender was his brother. He was educated at Bath College where he was Head Boy from 1882 to 1883. Exhibitioner of University College, Oxford. 1st in Mods. 1884; 1st. in Lit. Hum. 1887; MA. Harold was a friend of David Lloyd George, with whom he went hiking, and travelled to Germany. He married, in 1904, Violet Hilda Schuster. They had three sons, Michael, Stephen, Humphrey and one daughter, Christine. His wife died in 1921. After his death Stephen and Christine were raised in Hampstead by a governess.

== Professional career ==
He was on the staff of the Echo from 1887 to 1889. He was Lecturer for Oxford University Extension Delegacy from 1889 to 1892. He was on the staff of the Pall Mall Gazette from 1891 to 1893, the Westminster Gazette from 1893 to 1895, the Daily Chronicle from 1895 to 1899, the Manchester Guardian from 1899 to 1900 and the Daily News from 1900 to 1914. During the war he gave himself up to war savings propaganda, volunteering, and other war activities from 1914 to 1918.

== Political career ==
He was Liberal candidate for the Bath Division of Somerset at the 1922 General Election.

General Election 15 November 1922: Bath Electorate 33,023
Party	Candidate	Votes	%	±%
Unionist	Charles Talbot Foxcroft	13,666	50.2	−24.6
Liberal	Edward Harold Spender	8,699	32.0	n/a
Labour	Herbert Henry Elvin	4,849	17.8	−7.4
Majority				
Turnout			82.4	
Unionist hold		Swing		

== Family ==
He married Violet Hilda Schuster (1878–1921), daughter of Ernest Joseph Schuster (1850–1924), barrister, and his wife, Hilda Weber, daughter of Sir Herman Weber, a German-born doctor who became a naturalised British subject. Harold and Violet's children included the poet Stephen, the explorer Michael, and Humphrey Spender, a photojournalist and artist.

== Publications ==
- Story of the Home Rule Session, 1893
- At the Sign of the Guillotine, 1895
- Through the High Pyrenees, 1898
- The Arena, 1906
- Home Rule, 1912
- In Praise of Switzerland, 1912
- The Call of the Siren, 1913
- One Man Returns, 1914
- The Flame of Daring, 1915
- The Dividing Sword, 1916
- The Man Who Went, 1919
- A Briton in America, 1921
- Byron and Greece, 1924
- Men and Mansions, 1924
- The Cauldron of Europe, 1925

He published three biographies:

- Herbert Henry Asquith, 1915
- General Botha, 1916
- David Lloyd George, 1920
