= Ernest James Goddard =

Australian professor of biology

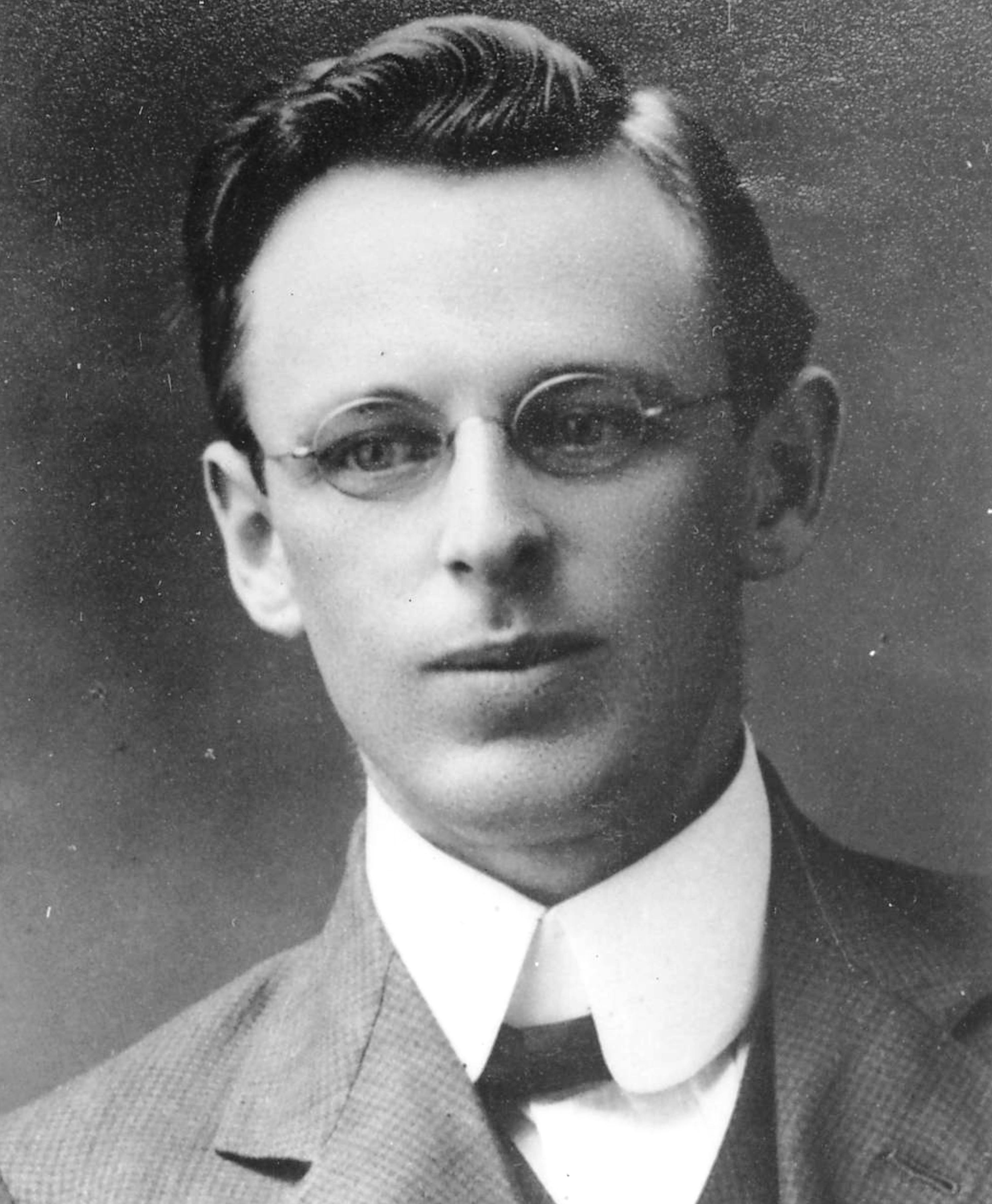
- Born: 20 February 1883; Newcastle, New South Wales
- Died: 17 January 1948 (aged 64)
- Education: Maitland High School; University of Sydney
- Scientific career
- Fields: Biologist

Ernest James Goddard (20 February 1883 – 17 January 1948), was an Australian professor of biology.

== Education ==
Ernest James Goddard was born on 20 February 1883 in Newcastle, New South Wales, one of six sons born to Alfred and Elizabeth Goddard. He attended Maitland High School and then his family moved to Sydney for his and his brother's education at the University of Sydney where he studied first a B.A. in 1904, and then took a BSc in 1906, with honours in zoology and palaeontology.

== Career ==
Goddard was appointed a junior demonstrator in biology while in the final years of his science degree, and also upon his graduation in 1906. Professor Edgeworth David employed him as a biologist for the Royal Society Expedition of Fiji. Upon his return from Fiji in 1908, Goddard became a Macleay Linnean Research Fellow in Zoology at the University of Sydney. He received the first D.Sc. degree awarded by the University of Sydney in 1910. Much of the content of this dissertation was published in the Journal of the Linnean Society of New South Wales. This led to his being offered the Chair of Zoology, Geology and Mineralogy at Victoria College, (Stellenbosch University from 1918), South Africa. The Department of Geology would be later split from his role, and he would mainly oversee zoology.

Goddard continued to publish, especially in the areas of his PhD research on leeches and earthworms. He undertook a zoological survey of South Africa upon commencing work there, and chose a site for the South African Marine Biological and Oceanographic Station. Many of his papers considered the Antarctic; he attempted to mount an expedition there, never obtained funding .

Goddard was interested in many social questions. Following WW1, racial tensions in South Africa increased. Despite making his zoology department the largest in South Africa, and being selected to join the Quest expedition to Antarctica as an oceanographer and marine biologist in 1922, Goddard applied for the Chair of Biology at the University of Queensland and was successful, taking up the post in 1923.

At Brisbane, Goddard was an active organiser and public speaker, promoting science in the public arena though lectures and newspaper publicity. He was especially interested in agricultural and economic biology, particularly entomology. He spoke on the use of cactoblastis in prickly pear eradication and was supervisor of the Bunchy Top Investigation committee, investigating this disease in bananas, in 1924.

Goddard became the first Dean of the Faculty of Agriculture in 1927. He then became involved with the establishment of a Faculty of Medicine, especially a degree in dentistry. After many years of negotiation and with Goddard defending his department's biology courses in the Dentistry Diploma course, the Faculty of Dentistry was established in 1935 with Goddard as the first dean. From 1931, Goddard worked toward establishing a Medical School, even getting the Masonic Lodge to donate their old building for an Anatomy School. In 1935, Goddard acted as spokesman on a visit to the Queensland Premier, William Forgan Smith, and was so persuasive that it was announced in Parliament the next day that a Faculty of Medicine would be established in 1936.

Other programs Goddard worked upon included establishing a physiotherapy course, which came into being after the Faculty of Medicine was approved. He was particularly keen to establish a marine biology station in Queensland and attempted to persuade the University Senate to purchase Dunk Island in 1927, and continued to put forward a number of island options over the next 20 years. Glass houses and laboratories for plant pathology, entomology and an insectarium were acquired through grant money and a forestry course commenced in 1924.

From 1936 to 1939 he was seconded to the Queensland Department of Agriculture and Stock as science coordinating officer.

In a paper to the zoology section of the A.N.Z.A.A.S, Goddard appealed for "an end to anthropocentrism in the study of Man. Instead he called for the "discovery, elucidation and dissemination of principles that will enable us to envisage with scientific precision the interdependence and inter-reaction of the animal organism or individual and its environment".

== Other activities ==
Goddard helped form the Entomological Society of Queensland in 1923. He was president of the Royal Society of Queensland in 1927, the Queensland Naturalists' Club, and the Australian-American Association. He was Chairman of the Queensland branch of the Australian Institute of Agricultural Science.

== Later life, death and legacy ==
While setting up the marine biology research station at Heron Island which he had toiled to establish and where he planned to retire to continue research, Goddard died of a heart attack on 17 January 1948. He was survived by his wife.

The Goddard Biological Sciences building fronting the Great Court of the University of Queensland was named for him.

After his death, the Goddard Memorial Fund was set up, the money from which helped to establish the Heron Island Research Station, then run by the Great Barrier Reef Committee. The University of Queensland would take over its operation in 1970, first as a partner and then as owner in 1980.

The Ernest James Goddard Oration was established by the Queensland Branch of the Australian Dental Association to commemorate his work as a pioneer of dental education in Queensland. The 20th oration was delivered in 2008.
