= Spender (disambiguation) =

Spender is a BBC television drama that aired between 1991 and 1993.

Spender may also refer to:

- Spender (surname), list of people with the name
- The Spender (1913 film), silent short romance film
- The Spender (1919 film), silent comedy film
- The Spenders, 1921 silent comedy film

== See also ==
- "Big Spender", a song
- Big Spender (TV series)
