= Hulda Friederichs =

Journalist and writer (1856/7–1927)

- Born: 1856/7; Ronsdorf, Kingdom of Prussia
- Died: 1927
- Occupations: writer and editor

Hulda Friederichs (1856/7 – 1927) was a Prussian journalist and writer working in London.

== Life ==
Friederichs was born in Ronsdorf in Prussia is 1856 or 1857. She went to school in her home town and in Cologne. By 1881 she was in London. She comes to notice in London where she is on a scheme organised by the University of St Andrews to improve women's higher education. Armed with the first part of this qualification she began work in 1883 at the Pall Mall Gazette when she became W.T.Stead's private secretary and she was promoted to "Chief Interviewer". W.T.Stead championed women's rights and she enjoyed the same pay and conditions as her male peers and their close relationship.

Friederichs gained the nickname of the "Prussian Governess" and was regarded as "probably the best woman interviewer." She conducted an investigation into women active in the Salvation Army. The staff of the gazette were surprised when it was sold to William Waldorf Astor. The paper became overnight a conservative publication and the political writers were persona non grata. Edward Tyas Cook who had been the editor at the Pall Mall Gazette was supported by George Newnes to create the Westminster Gazette in January 1893. Friederichs was among those who were reemployed by Cook and the Westminster Review achieved a successful launch.

She was given free rein to edit a family weekly titled "Westminster Budget" in 1896. The choice of a woman was regarded as an important decision. It was remarkable that Friederichs, a woman, was editing a newspaper.

She died in Wandsworth at her home on 12 February 1927.

== Selected publications ==
- The Life of Sir George Newnes Bart
- The Romance of the Salvation Army, 1907
- The Life of Sir George Newnes (1911)
- In the Evening of His Days, a Study of Mr. Gladstone in Retirement
- The Future of Russia - translation

== Legacy ==
Friederichs appears as a character in a crime novel, Watchers of the Dead, by Susanna Gregory a.k.a. Simon Beaufort.
