= Robert Endean =

Australian marine scientist

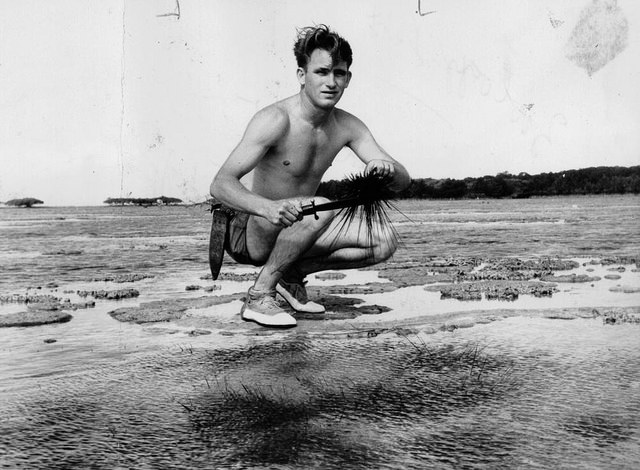
- Robert Endean on the Great Barrier Reef, Queensland, Australia in 1954. Photo used with the courtesy of the State Library of Queensland
- Born: 1925; Abermain, New South Wales, Australia
- Died: 6 October 1997; Heron Island, Queensland, Australia
- Education: University of Sydney, University of Queensland
- Scientific career
- Fields: Marine Biologist

Robert Endean (1925–1997) was an Australian marine scientist and academic at the University of Queensland.

== Early life ==
Robert Endean was born in December 1925 in Abermain, New South Wales, and was raised in Abernethy. He attended Cessnock High School and won a scholarship to study at the University of Sydney taking a B.Sc. with Honours in zoology in 1948 and a University Gold Medal. He took his M.Sc from the same university in 1949, supervised by the marine biologist, Professor William Dakin. He took his PhD at the University of Queensland in 1958.

== Career ==
Endean worked as a secretary, and later chair and president, of the Great Barrier Reef Committee from 1954 to 1975. It was during this time that the Heron Island Research Station passed to the control of the University of Queensland. Endean took up work as an assistant lecturer in 1950, rising to the position of reader in 1964 at the University of Queensland.

Endean's primary research was the study of the toxicology of marine organisms. particularly the crown-of-thorns starfish, acanthaster planci. He became an advocate for the environmental protection of the reef, principally from the crown of thorns starfish, and his publications and outreach work into the impacts of the starfish on coral ecology, led to the formation of the Great Barrier Reef Marine Park Authority (GBRMPA) in 1975.

Endean accompanied Hans Hass on his first expedition to the Great Barrier Reef. In 1967, Endean accompanied the Belgian Scientific Expedition that conducted studies of the Great Barrier Reef.

In the 1960s, Endean worked with Roche Laboratories to establish a research base at the Heron Island Research Station and study a number of active compounds found in marine organisms for medical research. He published 160 scientific papers and books during his career. His report prepared for the Queensland government into the outbreak of the crown of thorns starfish outbreak was dismissed in 1970. A later report to the Commonwealth government was also tabled, for which Endean continued to provide research submissions.

Endean was a member of the World Health Organisation's Expert Advisory Committee on Food Additives. He was deputy chair of the Heron Island board which oversaw the research station. He was a spokesperson on reef ecology, and had advised the community widely on toxins and marine pharmacology and biology. Endean retired from the University of Queensland in 1990, after 40 years of association with the Zoology Department.

== Legacy ==
Endean died on 6 October 1997 on Heron Island, shortly before he was due to give an address at the Australian Coral Reef Society. He was survived by his partner, Dr Ann Cameron, with whom he worked and daughter Dr Coralie Endean.

A reef was named for him – the Bob Endean Reef off Mission Beach, Queensland.
