= Quadrifoliovarium =

Scientific classification
- Kingdom: Animalia
- Phylum: Platyhelminthes
- Class: Trematoda
- Order: Plagiorchiida
- Family: Bunocotylidae
- Subfamily: Quadrifoliovariinae
- Genus: Quadrifoliovarium; Yamaguti, 1965

Type species
- Quadrifoliovarium pritchardae Yamaguti, 1965

Genus of digeneans

Quadrifoliovarium is a genus of digeneans in the subfamily Quadrifoliovariinae. It has four species, with Quadrifoliovarium pritchardae as the type species.

== Species ==
Quadrifoliovarium contains the following species:

- Quadrifoliovarium maceria Chambers & Cribb, 2006
- Quadrifoliovarium pritchardae Yamaguti, 1965
- Quadrifoliovarium quattuordecim Chambers & Cribb, 2006
- Quadrifoliovarium simplex Chambers & Cribb, 2006
