= Belgian Scientific Expedition =

Scientific survey of the Great Barrier Reef

Belgian Scientific Expedition was a scientific survey of the Great Barrier Reef, conducted in 1967–1968.

The Belgian Scientific Expedition to the Great Barrier Reef was a seven month expedition beginning in 1967, sponsored by the University of Liege, Belgium, the Belgium Ministry of Education and the National Foundation for Scientific Research. It indirectly honoured the Great Barrier Reef Expedition of 1928–1929, which was led by Maurice Yonge and a large group of researchers from Europe. This earlier expedition had studied the northern Great Barrier Reef primarily around Low Isles Reef.

The 1967 expedition, led by Professor Albert Distèche took place between Lady Musgrave Island and Lizard Island off the coast of Queensland on the Great Barrier Reef. Seventy-five ship's crew, many researchers and guests were involved in the expedition. Its primary objective was to make scientific marine biology films. Ron Taylor, who would become famous for his films and diving work with sharks was one of the cinematographers hired to undertake the underwater filming using a 35mm motion picture camera.

The former British warship, the De Moor was utilised for the study by the Belgian Navy. Captain Wally Muller was contracted to guide the De Moor through the Swain Reefs and remain with the expedition, on his charter vessel, the Careelah.

Coral reef scientists participated in the study as time permitted. The ship would return to shore every 10 days. Among these scientists were David Barnes from the Townsville area and Robert Endean from the University of Queensland. Sir Maurice Yonge would also visit during this expedition, in recognition of his earlier work in 1928.

Later studies of the Reef would be conducted and published as part of Project Stellaroid, which surveyed coral reefs in the North Pacific Ocean and their damage by the Crown of Thorns starfish.
