= Lillian Spender =

English reviewer and novelist (1835–1895)

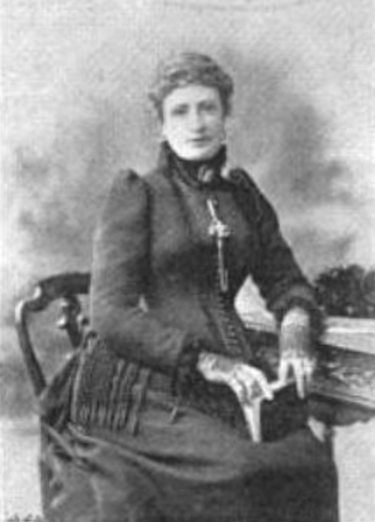
- Born: Lillian Headland; 22 February 1835; London, England
- Died: 4 May 1895 (aged 60); Bath, England
- Education: Queen's College, London
- Occupation: novelist
- Spouse: John Kent Spender (1858–1882)
- Children: J. A. Spender (1862–1942); Harold Spender (1864–1926); Hugh Frederick Spender (1873–1930); 1 other son
- Relatives: Stephen Spender (grandson)

Lillian Spender (usually known as Mrs. John Kent Spender; 22 February 1835 – 4 May 1895) was an English writer. She contributed to major English reviews and turned later to novel-writing.

== Early years and education ==
Lillian (known informally as Lily) Headland was born on 22 February 1835 as the daughter of Edward Headland, a well-known physician of Portland Place, London. Her mother was the daughter of Ferdinand de Medina, a Spaniard. Spender was educated at Queen's College, Harley Street.

== Career ==
In 1858, she married John Kent Spender, physician to the Mineral Water Hospital, Bath.

After her marriage, Spender turned her attention to literature. She contributed to the London Quarterly Review, the English Woman's Journal, the Dublin University Review, the British Quarterly Review, and a magazine called Meliora, but after 1869, she mainly wrote novels. She was active in education and social work in Bath until her health failed.

Lillian Spender died at Bath on 4 May 1895. Seven of Spender's eight children survived her. Two of her sons, J. A. Spender and Harold Spender, became London journalists.

== Selected works ==
- Brothers-in-Law (1869)
- Her Own Fault (1871)
- Parted Lives (1873)
- Jocelyn's Mistake (1875)
- Mark Eylmer's Revenge (1876)
- Both in the Wrong (1878)
- Godwyn's Ordeal (1879)
- Till Death Us Do Part (1881)
- Gabrielle de Bourdaine (1882)
- Mr. Nobody (1884)
- The Recollections of a Country Doctor (1885)
- Trust Me: A Novel (1886)
- Her Brother's Keeper: A Novel (1887)
- Kept Secret (1888)
- Lady Hazelton's Confession (1890)
- A Waking (1892)
- A Strange Temptation (1893)
- A Modern Quixote (1894)

== Sources ==
- This article incorporates text from a publication now in the public domain: Carlyle, Edward Irving (1898). "Spender, Lily". In Lee, Sidney (ed.). Dictionary of National Biography. Vol. 53. London: Smith, Elder & Co.
