= Bunocotylidae =

Scientific classification
- Kingdom: Animalia
- Phylum: Platyhelminthes
- Class: Trematoda
- Order: Plagiorchiida
- Superfamily: Hemiuroidea
- Family: Bunocotylidae; Dollfus, 1950

Family of digeneans

Bunocotylidae is a family of digeneans in the superfamily Hemiuroidea. It has sixteen genera, arranged in four subfamilies.

== Genera ==
Bunocotylidae contains the following subfamilies and genera:

In the subfamily Bunocotylinae:

- Bunocotyle Odhner, 1928
- Parasaturnius Andrade-Gómez & Pérez-Ponce de León, 2024
- Robinia Pankov, Webster, Blasco-Costa, Gibson, Littlewood, Balbuena & Kostadinova, 2006
- Saturnius Manter, 1969

In the subfamily Hysterolecithinae:

- Hysterolecitha Linton, 1910
- Hysterolecithoides Yamaguti, 1934
- Machidatrema León-Règagnon, 1998
- Thulinia Gibson & Bray, 1979

In the subfamily Opisthadeninae:

- Genolinea Manter, 1925
- Mitrostoma Manter, 1954
- Neopisthadena Machida, 1980
- Neotheletrum Gibson & Bray, 1979
- Opisthadena Linton, 1910

In the subfamily Quadrifoliovariinae:

- Bilacinia Manter, 1969
- Quadrifoliovarium Yamaguti, 1965
- Unilacinia Manter, 1969
