= Humphrey Spender =

British photographer

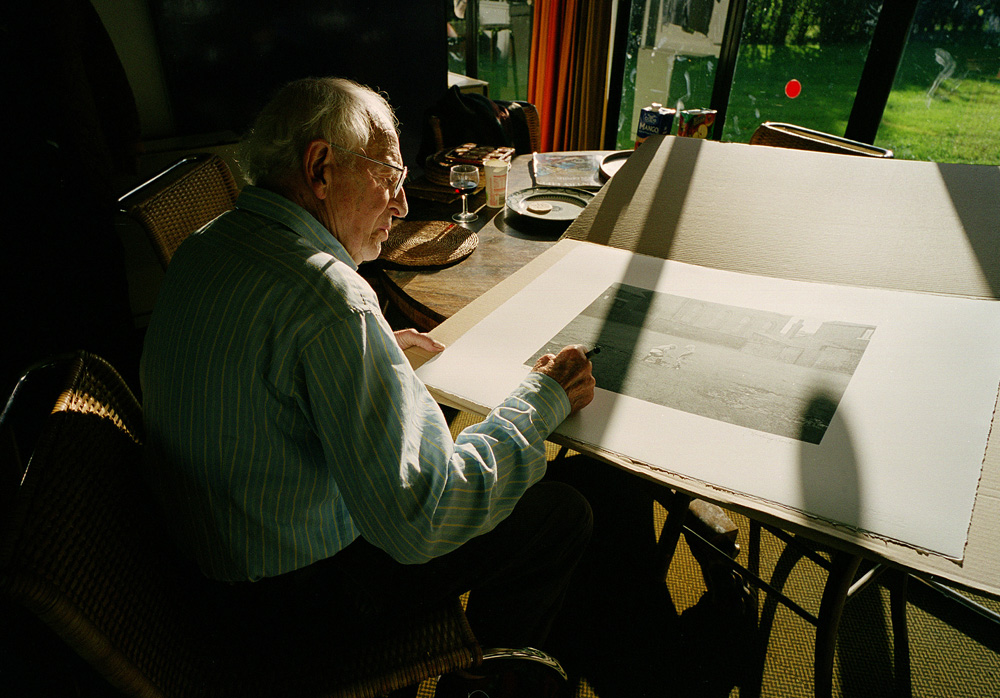
- Spender at home in 1999
- Born: Humphrey Spender; 10 April 1910; London, England
- Died: 11 March 2005 (aged 94); Maldon, England
- Occupations: Artist, designer, photographer
- Years active: 1935–2005
- Spouses: Margaret Low (m. 1937; died 1945); Pauline Wynne (m. 1948; died 2003); Rachel Hewiitt (m. 2003–2005)
- Children: 2

Humphrey Spender (19 April 1910 – 11 March 2005) was a British photographer, painter, and designer.

== Family and education ==
Humphrey Spender was the third son of Harold Spender, a journalist and writer. Humphrey's mother, Violet Schuster, came from a German family who had emigrated to Britain in the 1870s. Violet died in 1921 and Harold Spender died in 1926. Humphrey had two brothers, the poet Stephen Spender and the scientist and explorer Michael Spender, and one sister, Christine.

As a child, Humphrey learnt photography from his older brother Michael Spender and was given a handsome German camera for his tenth birthday. After attending Gresham's School, Spender initially studied art history at Freiburg University for a year, where he spent time with his brother, Stephen Spender, and other literary figures including Christopher Isherwood. During this period he gained exposure to continental European avant-garde photography and film. He enrolled at the Architectural Association School of Architecture, but became disinclined to practice as an architect. Soon after graduating from the school Spender decided to make a career in photography.

== Career ==
He went on to set up a photography studio on the Strand with Bill Edmiston, who was his lover. Spender was renowned for his commercial photography. During this time he took photographs for advertisements as well as magazines like Harper's Bazaar. In the mid-1930s, he was recruited to work for the Daily Mirror under the nickname 'Lensman'.

Spender became a member of the Mass Observation movement, taking pictures of daily life in working class communities. His most famous photographs are of the 'Worktown Study'. (Worktown was the Mass Observationist's codename for Bolton). Taken in a period between 1937 and 1940, his photographs cover the full range of Mass-Observation's interests – politics and elections; religion; street scenes; industrial landscapes; the public house; market scenes; new buildings and developments; observers in action; sport and leisure time; work in the textile mills; on holiday in Blackpool; street hoardings and advertisements. Spender was joined in this project by the artist, Graham Bell.Toward the end of his involvement with Mass Observation, Spender also took on work as a photographer for the recently established, highly successful photographically illustrated magazine Picture Post.

With the coming of World War II, Spender served briefly in the Royal Army Service Corps before being appointed an official war photographer. He also worked as an interpreter of photo-reconnaissance pictures, identifying German rocket sites and making maps for D-Day.

In December 1944 during World War II, Spender was staying at the Hotel Gruenwalder in Innsbruck, Austria as part of his reconnaissance work with the Royal Army Service Corps. On 17 December, Spender encountered Heinrich Himmler, the notorious head of the Nazi SS who had arrived at the hotel unannounced armed with a team of soldiers. [What was Spender doing in enemy territory in war-time – this story does not add up] Himmler was seated at a table when Spender walking past, was asked to approach him and speak in German. [Highly unlikely] Because of his mother's German-Jewish ancestry and his time spent in Germany, Spender luckily was conversant in the language and quietly left the hotel unnoticed. Otherwise it would have meant certain death for him because of his background.

Spender also recounted a time he heard Adolf Hitler speak at a public gathering in Berlin in 1939. He said his voice was "very powerful and commanding".

In about 1955 he abandoned photography for painting and textile design, and taught at the Royal College of Art from 1953 until he retired in 1975.

In 1968, Spender moved to Maldon, Essex, where he lived at The Studio, Ulting. This was the first built design by architect Richard Rogers.

== Marriages ==
Spender's first wife, Margaret Low, with whom he adopted a son, died in 1945. His second wife, Pauline Wynn, with whom he had a son, died in 2003. He then married the photographer Rachel Hewitt, who was more than fifty years younger.

Spender had told his wives before marrying them that he was bisexual, like his brother Stephen Spender, and he had affairs with both men and women throughout his life, including Frederick Ashton and Eslanda Goode Robeson.
