= Philip Spender =

British fundraiser (born 1943)

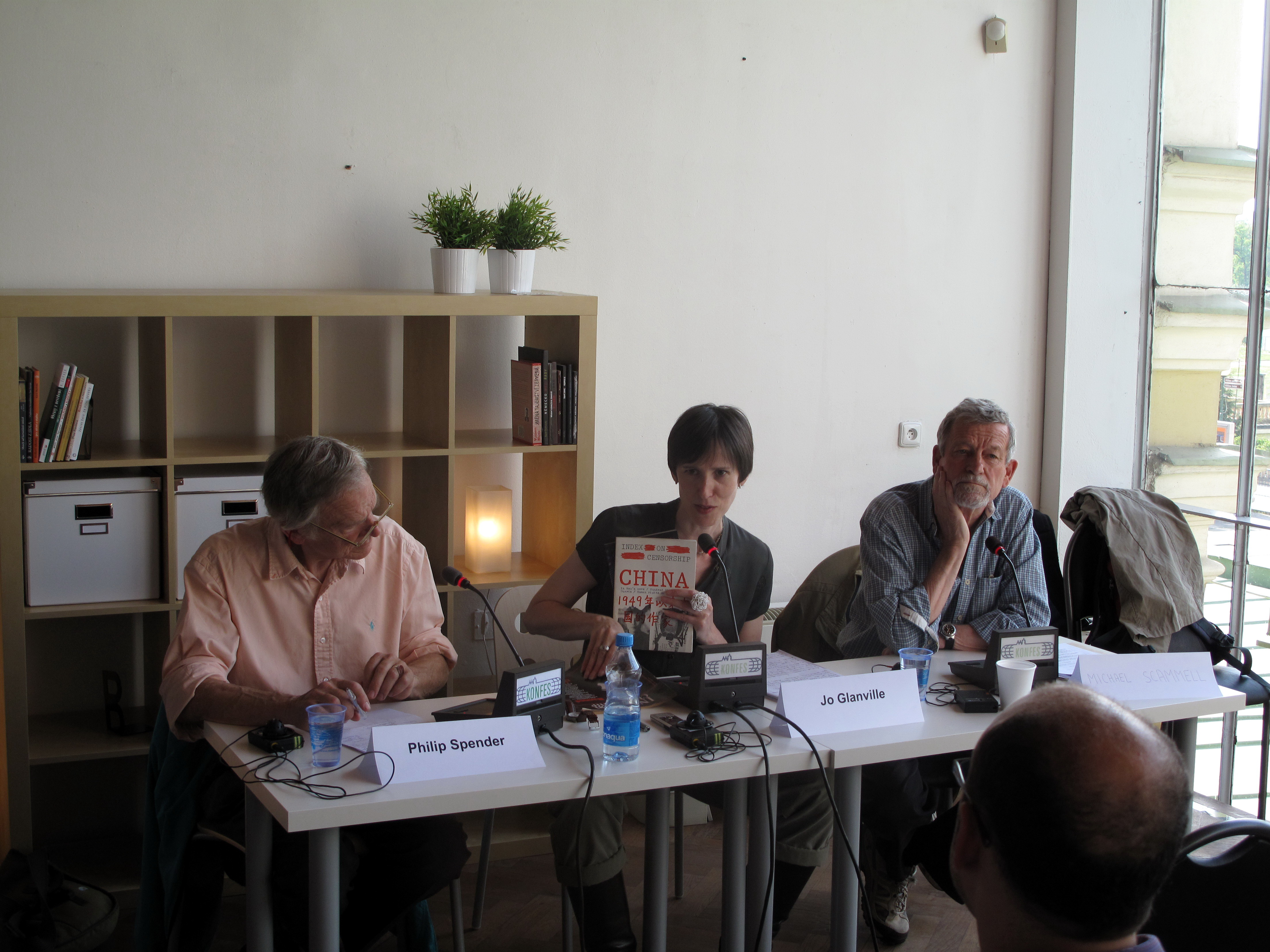
Philip Spender, Jo Glanville, Michael Scammell

Philip Spender (born 1943) is a prominent public-sector fundraiser who has worked with Index on Censorship, the Writers and Scholars Educational Trust, and OneWorld Online. He is the son of the painter Nancy Spender and the explorer Michael Spender, a nephew of the poet Stephen Spender, and a trustee of the Stephen Spender Memorial Trust.

He was the dedicatee of W. H. Auden's poem Epistle to a Godson (1969).
