= Edward Tyas Cook =

E. T. Cook
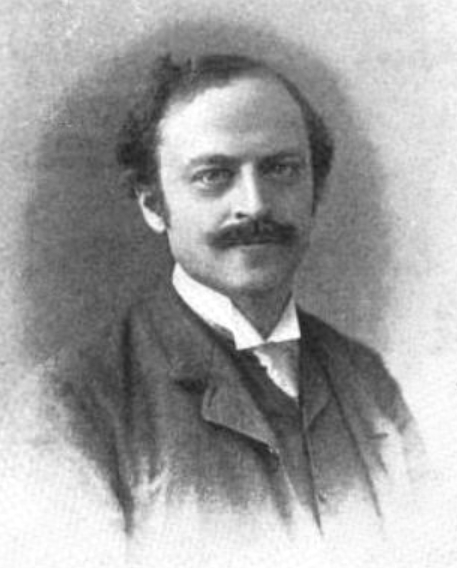
- In The Sketch, 8 January 1896
- Born: Edward Tyas Cook; 12 May 1857; Brighton, England
- Died: 30 September 1919 (aged 62); South Stoke, Oxfordshire, England
- Education: New College, Oxford
- Occupations: Journalist; editor; author
- Spouse: Emily Constance Baird (1884–1903)

Sir Edward Tyas Cook (12 May 1857 – 30 September 1919) was an English journalist, biographer, and man of letters.

== Biography ==
Born in Brighton, Cook was the youngest son of Silas Kemball Cook, secretary of the Royal Naval Hospital, Greenwich, and his wife, Emily, née Archer. He was educated at Winchester and New College, Oxford, where he was President of the Union and graduated with a double first. His friends assumed he would pursue a career in politics, but Cook's goal was to enter journalism. Moving to London, he worked as secretary for the London Society for Extension of University Teaching and made occasional contributions to several journals. During this time he joined Inner Temple but never sat for his bar finals.

=== Working on the Pall Mall Gazette ===
In August 1888, Cook was recruited by his friend Alfred Milner for a part-time position with the Liberal newspaper the Pall Mall Gazette, then under the editorship of John Morley. Cook was interviewed by Morley who, during the interview

asked me if I was an Oxford man. I said "Yes"; and then he asked me whether I was a very confirmed one – whether, for instance, I was a Fellow of a College. When I said "No", he said, "Then there is still some hope for you".

Cook subsequently succeeded Milner as assistant editor to Morley's successor, W. T. Stead. Upon Stead's resignation in 1889 Cook was selected as his replacement. Cook soon proved himself a more than capable editor, with a writing style more analytical than Stead's impassioned approach. As editor Cook carried forward many of the positions Stead advocated, such as Liberal Imperialism and a strong navy, but he brought in a younger group of writers as contributors.

=== Founding The Westminster Gazette ===
Cook's tenure as editor of the Pall Mall Gazette was cut short when he was obliged to resign along with the rest of the political staff after the paper was sold to W. W. Astor, who changed its politics to support Conservative positions. Seeking to fill the gap created by the Pall Mall Gazette's departure from the Liberal fold, Cook started a new evening paper in January 1893, The Westminster Gazette. Launched with the help of Liberal publisher George Newnes and employing the core of the old political staff from the Pall Mall Gazette, the paper quickly established itself in the front rank of Liberal publications, earning the respect and admiration of the Liberal prime minister Lord Rosebery. Yet Cook insisted on preserving his independence as editor, and was not above supporting Unionist politicians when he felt them deserving of it.

=== Editing the Daily News ===
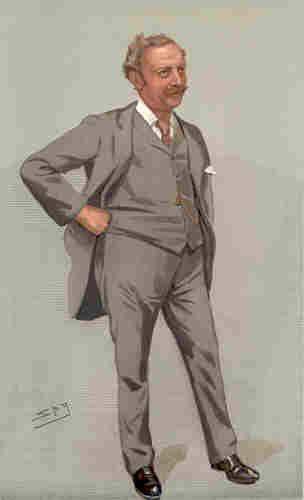
1899 portrait in Vanity Fair

In December 1895, Cook was approached by Arnold Morley about editing the Daily News. Considered to be "the single 'quality' Liberal morning paper", it suffered from falling sales and had earned the ire of many in the Liberal Party for its opposition to Rosebery's policies. Cook agreed only after Morley assured him that, as with the Westminster Gazette, there would be no interference with the Cook's editorial management. As editor, Cook continued to support what he thought was right, but despite his best efforts he was unable to reverse the decline in circulation.

The start of Boer War in 1899 brought Cook directly into conflict with the Little Englander wing of the Liberal Party. When David Lloyd George organised a consortium of Liberal businessmen to purchase the Daily News in 1901, he declared that the paper would adopt a stance of neutrality on the war. A strong imperialist, Cook was unable to remain under these circumstances, and was replaced by R. C. Lehmann.

=== Subsequent life and career ===
After leaving the Daily News, Cook worked as a leader writer for the Daily Chronicle from 1900 until 1910. His main achievement during those years, however, was to edit the writings of John Ruskin, on which he worked with Alexander Wedderburn. Published in thirty-nine volumes between 1903 and 1911, this remains the definitive collection of Ruskin's writings. Upon concluding this task, Cook moved on to writing other works, producing biographies of Florence Nightingale and John Delane as well as handbooks to the National Gallery and the Tate Gallery, and to the Greek and Roman antiquities in the British Museum. A modern biographer of Nightingale comments that Cook’s work remains, nearly a century after it was written, “the unsurpassed account” of her public life. Cook was quick as well as effective: he completed the research and writing of one thousand pages in nine months.

At the start of the World War I, Cook lent his abilities to the war effort. He quickly produced a short pamphlet, How Britain Strove for Peace, which put the animus for starting the conflict onto Germany. In 1915 he became joint director of the official Press Bureau along with Sir Frank Swettenham. Created to direct press coverage of the war, its function evolved with the conflict, yet Cook was greatly respected by his contemporaries for performing a difficult job with wisdom and devotion. Having been knighted in 1912, he was created Knight Commander (KBE) in 1917 on the inauguration of the Order of the British Empire. After the war he produced two volumes of Literary Reflections, and an account of the Press Bureau that was published after his death.

=== Personal life ===
His wife, Emily Constance Cook (née Baird), was also an author, usually writing under the name of "Mrs. E. T. Cook". Her books included London in the Time of the Diamond Jubilee (London: George Allen, c. 1897), The Bride's Book (London: Hodder & Stoughton, 1901), Highways and Byways in London (London: Macmillan, 1903), From a Woman's Note-Book: Studies in Modern Girlhood, and Other Sketches (London: George Allen, 1903), From a Holiday Journal ... Illustrated with Sketches and Photographs by the Author (London: George Allen, 1904) and London and Environs (Llangollen: Darlington & Co. and London: Simpkin, Marshall, Hamilton, Kent & Co., 1909).

== Works ==
His books included:

- Studies in Ruskin: Some Aspects of the Work and Teaching of John Ruskin (London: George Allen, 1891)
- Rights and Wrongs of the Transvaal War (London: Edward Arnold, 1901)
- Edmund Garrett: A Memoir (London: Edward Arnold, 1909)
- The Life of John Ruskin (2 vols.) (London: George Allen and New York, Macmillan, 1911)
- Life of Florence Nightingale (2 vols.) (London: Macmillan, 1913)
- Delane of "The Times" (Constable, 1915) (Makers of the Nineteenth Century series)
- Literary Reflections (1918–1919)
- The Press in War-Time: with some Account of the Official Press Bureau (London: Macmillan, 1920)

== Notes ==
Media offices
Preceded by W. T. Stead	Editor of the Pall Mall Gazette; 1890–1892	Succeeded by Henry Cust
Preceded by New position	Editor of the Westminster Gazette; 1893–1896	Succeeded by J. A. Spender
Preceded by John Robinson	Editor of the Daily News; 1896–1901	Succeeded by R. C. Lehmann
