= Maurice Yonge =

English zoologist

Sir Charles Maurice Yonge, CBE, FRS FRSE (9 December 1899 – 17 March 1986) was an English marine zoologist.

== Life ==
Charles Maurice Yonge was born in Silcoates School near Wakefield in Yorkshire in 1899 the son of John Arthur Yonge (1865–1946) and his wife, Sarah Edith Carr. He was educated at Silcoates School, where his father was headmaster.

After leaving school at 17, and enrolling in the University of Leeds, Yonge joined the Army Training Corps during 1917–1918. After the war ended, Yonge read history at the University of Oxford, before transferring to the University of Edinburgh in 1919 to study forestry and later zoology. He was a Baxter Natural Science Scholar while at Edinburgh, working as an Assistant Naturalist with the Marine Biological Association, mainly at Plymouth.

After graduation with a B.Sc. in 1922, Yonge proceeded to a PhD on the digestive system of marine invertebrates. He took his D.Sc in 1927, for his research into oysters, and then moved to Cambridge in 1927 as a Balfour student, where he was invited to join and lead the Great Barrier Reef Expedition of 1928–1929. Yonge, his wife Mattie and his colleagues in the expedition spent a year off the coast of Queensland, studying Australia's Great Barrier Reef, in particular Low Isles Reef. Their work was published in the book, A year on the Great Barrier Reef.

In 1933, Yonge became Professor of Zoology at the University of Bristol, and was made Regius Professor of Zoology at the University of Glasgow in 1944. Yonge returned to Australia in 1967 to review the Great Barrier Reef with Thomas Goreau and observed some of the Belgian Scientific Expedition to the reef of the same year. He was supportive of the Royal Society and Universities of Queensland Expedition to the northern Great Barrier Reef in 1973. Among other topics, he made a study of filter feeding by marine animals. He returned to Australia in 1975 to open the Australian Museum's Lizard Island Marine Station. He and Lady Phyllis returned to the Great Barrier Reef and visited Low Isles Reef in 1978.

He died in Edinburgh on 17 March 1986.

== Publications ==
- A Year on the Great Barrier Reef
- The Sea Shore
- British Marine Life

== Recognition ==
In 1945 he was elected a Fellow of the Royal Society of Edinburgh. His proposers were Francis Balfour-Browne, James Ritchie, Sir D'Arcy Wentworth Thompson, and Alexander Charles Stephen. He served as Vice President of the Society from 1953 to 1956 and 1969 to 1970 and as President from 1970 to 1973.

Yonge was elected a Fellow of the Royal Society in 1946 and won its Darwin Medal in 1968.

He was knighted by Queen Elizabeth II in 1967.

Yonge received an Honorary Doctorate from Heriot-Watt University in 1971.

In 1927 Yonge married Dr Martha "Mattie" Lennox, a fellow student he had met during their days at Edinburgh, where she was reading medicine. They had two children, Elspeth (born 1931) and Robin (born 1934). Mattie Lennox Yonge died in 1945. In 1955, Yonge became father-in-law of the physicist Bruno Touschek due to Elspeth's marriage.

Sir Maurice Yonge died in 1986. He was survived by his second wife, Phyllis Fraser, whom he married in 1954. They had a son, Christopher (born 1955).

== Legacy ==
Yonge's extensive private marine biology library was sold to the Australian Institute of Marine Science in 1982. It is now housed at James Cook University Library. A reef off the northern coast of Queensland was also named for him.

A sculpture of Sir Maurice Yonge was created by Jason deCaires Taylor for the Museum of Underwater Art as part of the Ocean Sentinels above the surface exhibition in 2022

The Seawhip Goby, Bryaninops yongei (Davis & Cohen 1968) was named yongei for Sir Maurice Yonge "our shipmate on Cruise 6 of TE VEGA".
