= Stephen Koss =

American historian (1940–1984)

Stephen Edward Koss (25 May 1940 – 25 October 1984) was an American historian specialising in subjects relating to Britain.

Koss received his BA, MA, and PhD from Columbia University, where he was a student of R.K. Webb. He began his academic career at the University of Delaware, and became an assistant professor at Barnard College, New York City in 1966, and then a full professor in 1971. He was appointed a professor of history at Columbia University in 1978, where he had completed his bachelor's and master's degrees, as well as his doctorate; the doctoral thesis was turned into his first book John Morley at the India Office, 1905–1910 published in 1969, the same year as his biography of R.B. Haldane. He was also a visiting fellow at All Souls College, Oxford. He served on the editorial board of The Journal of Modern History and held office with the North American Conference on British Studies. He died on 25 October 1984 as a result of complications following heart surgery.

The historian F.M. Leventhal observed that as Koss matured there was "an increasingly irreverent and ironic tone in [his] scholarship, a willingness to criticize as well as to condone". His death was mourned in several academic books published soon after, together with that of Alan J. Lee, who had also written on the history of newspapers in Britain and who had also died at a relatively young age.

Koss is best remembered for a two-volume work The Rise and Fall of the Political Press in Britain (1981, 1984), respectively covering the nineteenth and twentieth centuries. Neal Ascherson, reviewing the second volume in 1985, wrote: "Koss was the archive-cruncher of his age. But he had another gift, which was to make the imparting of densely-packed information stylish, readable, often mockingly witty." The two volumes of The Rise and Fall of the Political Press in Britain were later published by Fontana as a single volume.

A tribute volume appeared in 1987: The Political Culture of Modern Britain: Studies in Memory of Stephen Koss, edited by J. M. W. Bean, with a foreword by John Gross (London: Hamilton).

== Publications ==
- "Morley in the Middle". The English Historical Review. 82 (324): 553–561. July 1967. doi:10.1093/ehr/lxxxii.cccxxiv.553. JSTOR 559429.
- "John Morley and the Communal Question". The Journal of Asian Studies. 26 (3): 381–387. May 1967. doi:10.2307/2051415. JSTOR 2051415.
- "The Destruction of Britain's Last Liberal Government". The Journal of Modern History. 40 (2): 257–277. June 1968. doi:10.1086/240192. JSTOR 1876732.
- John Morley at the India Office, 1905-1910. Yale University Press. 1969.
- Lord Haldane, Scapegoat for Liberalism. Columbia University Press. 1969.
- Sir John Brunner: Radical Plutocrat, 1842-1919. Cambridge University Press. 1970.
- "British Political Biography as History". Political Science Quarterly. 88 (4): 713–724. December 1973. doi:10.2307/2148166. JSTOR 2148166.
- Fleet Street Radical: A. J. Gardiner and the Daily News. Archon. 1973.
- The Pro-Boers: The Anatomy of an Anti-War Movement. University of Chicago Press. 1973. (editor)
- "Lloyd George and Nonconformity: The Last Rally". The English Historical Review. 89 (350): 77–108. January 1974. doi:10.1093/ehr/lxxxix.cccl.77. JSTOR 565044.
- "Wesleyanism and Empire". The Historical Journal. 18 (1): 105–118. March 1975. doi:10.1017/s0018246x00008694. JSTOR 2638470.
- Nonconformity in Modern British Politics. Shoestring Press/Archon Books. 1975.
- Asquith. St. Martin's Press/Allen Lane. 1976.
- The Rise and Fall of the Political Press in Britain. Vol. 1: Nineteenth Century. University of North Carolina Press. 1981.
- The Rise and Fall of the Political Press in Britain. Vol. 2: Twentieth Century. University of North Carolina Press. 1984.
