= Michaelmas and Upolu Cays National Park =

National park in Australia

- IUCN category II (national park)
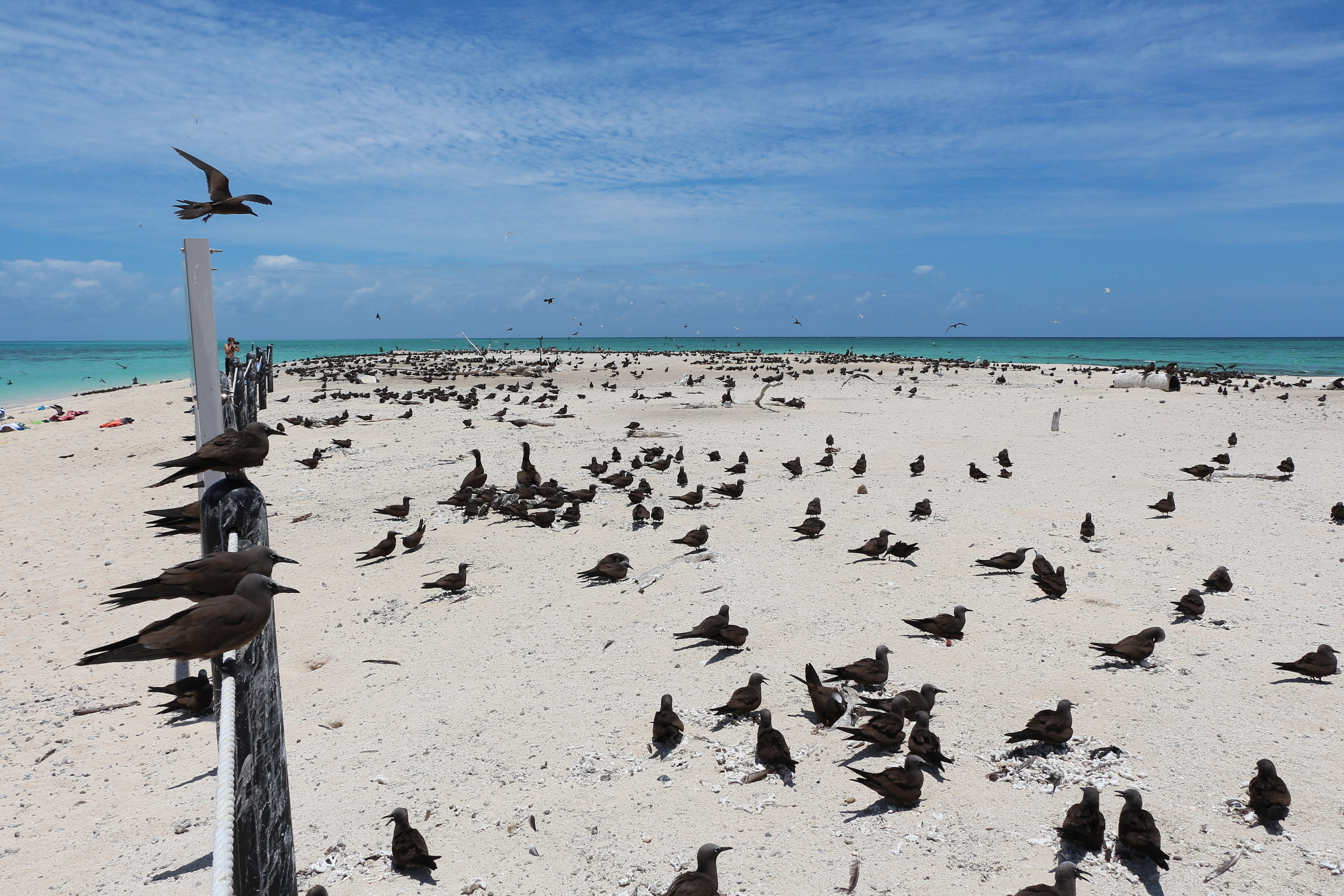
- Michaelmas Cay

- Location within Queensland
- Location: Queensland
- Nearest city: Cairns
- Coordinates: 16°36′30″S 145°58′21″E
- Area: 30 km^{2} (12 sq mi)
- Established: 1975
- Governing body: Queensland Parks and Wildlife Service
- Website: Official website

Michaelmas and Upolu Cays is a national park in Queensland, Australia, 1,409 km (876 mi) north-northwest of Brisbane and 33 km (21 mi) east of Cairns. It comprises two small cays on Michaelmas Reef, which forms the north-eastern section of the Arlington reef complex, within the Great Barrier Reef.

== Flora and fauna ==
=== Plants ===
The vegetation on Michaelmas Cay is characteristic of cays found on the outer barrier reef. Low-growing, it consists of beach spinifex, stalky grass, goatsfoot, bulls-head vine, sea purslane and tar vine. Nutrients fertilising the vegetation come from seabird droppings and carcasses. The smaller Upolu Cay is un-vegetated.

=== Animals ===
Michaelmas Cay is important as a breeding site for several species of terns. It has been identified by BirdLife International as an Important Bird Area (IBA) because it supports over 1% of the world populations of greater and lesser crested terns. Sooty terns and common noddies also breed there. Other terns that have nested on the cay in the past include roseate and black-naped terns.

Green turtles sometimes nest on the cays. The surrounding reefs have a rich marine fauna, including giant clams.

== See also ==
- Protected areas of Queensland
