= Michael Spender =

English explorer

- Born: Michael Alfred Spender; 11 November 1906; Kensington, London, England
- Died: 5 May 1945 (aged 38) near Süchteln, Nazi Germany
- Cause of death: Killed in action
- Known for: Explorer and surveyor

Michael Alfred Spender (11 November 1906 – 5 May 1945) was an English explorer, surveyor, a leader in photo interpretation in the Second World War, and an RAF squadron leader.

== Personal life ==
He was the eldest son of Harold Spender and Violet, and a brother of the poet Stephen Spender and the artist Humphrey Spender.

He graduated from Balliol College, Oxford University, with a double first in Engineering, and then worked as a surveyor on the Great Barrier Reef from 1928 to 1929 and in East Greenland in 1932 and 1933. In 1935 he joined an expedition to the Himalayas and mapped 26 peaks over 26,000 feet.

In 1933 he married his first wife Erika Haarmann, and their son John-Christopher was born in 1936. In the late 1930s the artist Nancy Sharp (the first wife of William Coldstream and the lover of Louis MacNeice), fell in love with Spender. Michael and Nancy divorced their respective spouses, and they were married in 1943. Their son Philip was born the same year.

Spender was regarded as arrogant and tactless, and he had a difficult relationship with his brother Stephen.

== Death ==
On 3 May 1945 Michael was a passenger in an Avro Anson aircraft, and he was seriously injured when it crashed near Süchteln in Germany; he died on 5 May. Stephen was deeply affected, and he wrote the elegy Seascape for his brother.

He was buried at Eindhoven General Cemetery at Woensel in the Netherlands.
