= A. J. A. Morris =

British historian (born 1936)

Andrew James Anthony Morris (born 1936) is a British historian.

He was educated at the London School of Economics and in 1974 was appointed Head of the School of Philosophy, Politics and History at Ulster College (now the University of Ulster). In 1981 he was elected a Nuffield Foundation Research Fellow.

Morris has contributed 39 articles to the Oxford Dictionary of National Biography.

== Works ==
- Radicalism Against War 1906-1914 (1972)
- Edwardian Radicalism 1900-1914 (editor, 1974)
- C. P. Trevelyan: Portrait of a Radical (1977)
- The Scaremongers: The Advocacy of War and Rearmament 1896-1914 (1984)
- The Letters of Lieutenant-Colonel Charles à Court Repington CMG, Military Correspondent of The Times, 1903-1918 (editor, 1999)
- Reporting the First World War: Charles Repington, The Times and the Great War (2017)
