= Heron Island (Queensland) =

Coral cay in Queensland, Australia

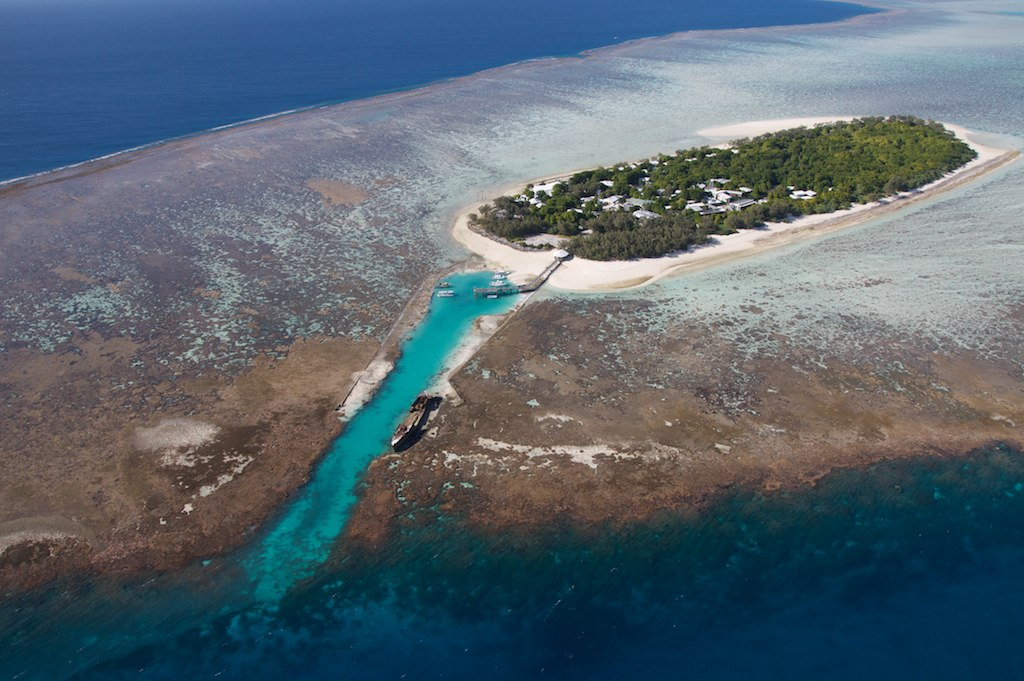
- Heron Island

- Location within Queensland

Geography
- Location: In the southern Great Barrier Reef
- Area: 0.29 km^{2} (0.11 sq mi)
- Length: 0.8 km (0.5 mi)
- Width: 0.3 km (0.19 mi)
- Highest elevation: 3.6 m (11.8 ft)

Administration
- Australia
- State: Queensland

Heron Island is a coral cay located near the Tropic of Capricorn in the southern Great Barrier Reef. It is 87 kilometres (54 miles) north-east of Gladstone, Queensland, Australia, and 460 km (290 mi) north-north-west of the state capital Brisbane. The island is situated on the leeward (western) side of Heron Reef, a fringing platform reef of significant biodiversity, supporting around 900 of the 1,500 fish species and 72% of the coral species found on the Great Barrier Reef. During the summer months Heron Island is also home to over 200,000 birds including Noddy Terns and Mutton Birds.

The island is about 800 metres (2,600 feet) long and 300 metres (980 ft) at its widest, giving an area of approximately 16 hectares (40 acres). The highest point, near the western tip, is 3.6 metres (12 ft) above sea level. A dune ridge along the southern shore rises some 3 metres (9 ft 10 in) above sea level, lower dunes on the north-eastern side are only about one metre (3 ft 3 in) above the sea.

Heron Island and an extrapolated version of the research station are the scene of much of the first part of Arthur C. Clarke's The Deep Range.

== History ==
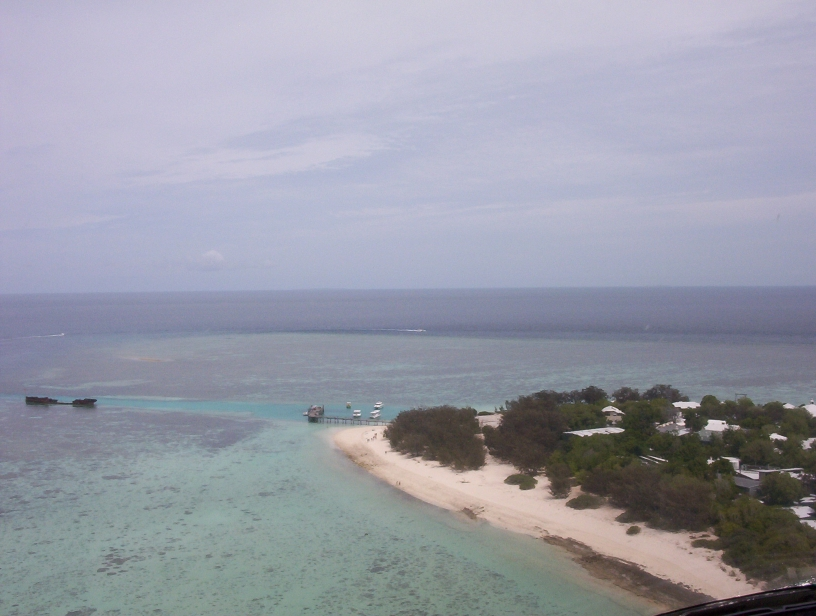
Harbour and Research Station from helicopter

There is no evidence of Indigenous presence or activity on Heron Island; it is over 65 km (35 nmi) from the Australian mainland.

The island was discovered on 12 January 1843 by a Royal Navy expedition comprising the corvette HMS Fly and the cutter Bramble. The expedition, commanded by Captain Francis Blackwood, was engaged in surveying the eastern edge of the Great Barrier Reef to map out detailed plans for safe passages within the reef.

The island was named by Lieutenant Charles Bampfield Yule, the commander of Bramble.

The island did not become inhabited until the early 20th century when a turtle cannery was established. The aim was to profit from the seasonal influx of green turtles, but the venture soon found it difficult to keep the business afloat. Other attempts at establishing fisheries were abandoned.

In 1932 Captain Christian Poulsen, engaged in bringing fishing parties to the reef, realised the potential of the island as a tourist attraction. In 1936 he bought the lease of the island for £290. On 11 September 1943, the entire island was declared a National Park.

== Land use ==
Views of Heron Island

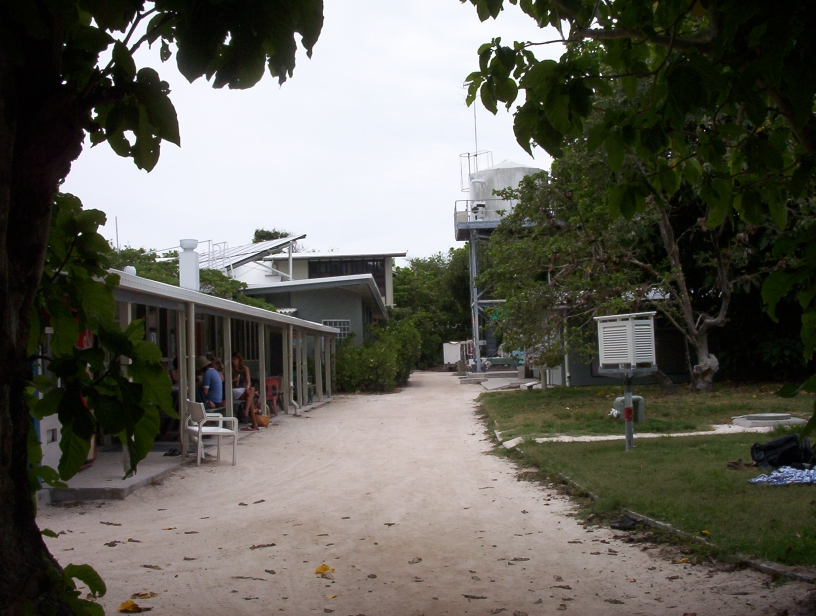
Heron Island Research Station in 2005

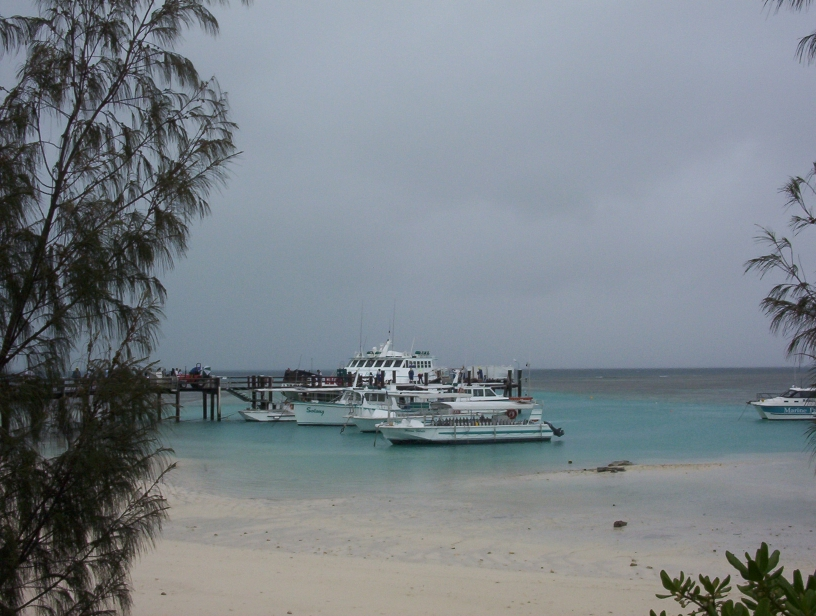
Harbour and jetty, loading passengers onto launch

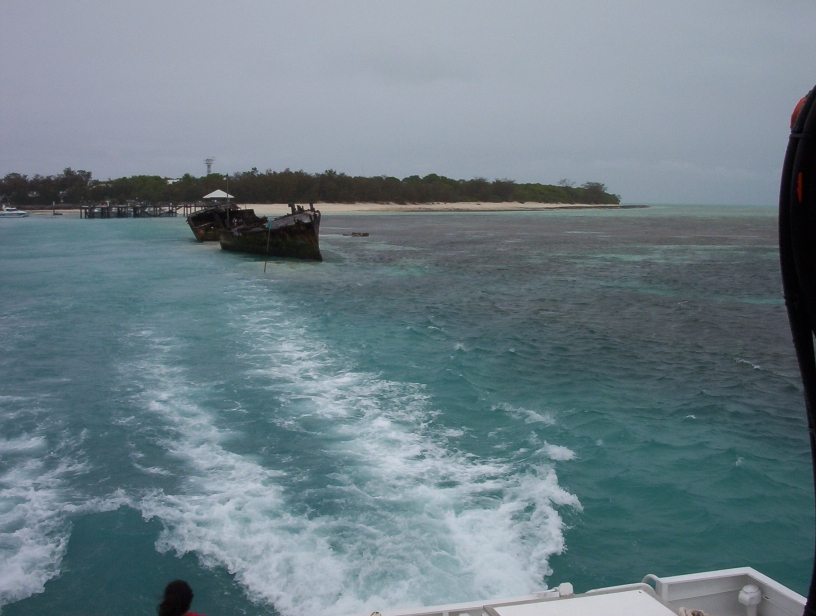
Launch leaving Heron Island, with the wreck of HMAS Protector in the foreground

=== Heron Island Resort ===
Heron Island Resort, operated by the Aldesta Group, is located in the north-west corner of the island. The resort is a popular getaway for scuba diving and snorkelling and accommodates up to 300 guests and 100 staff members. It was owned by P&O before being sold to Voyages Hotels & Resorts in 2004. In March 2012 Heron Island Resort was featured in the BBC's nature TV series Great Barrier Reef.

=== Heron Island Research Station ===
The University of Queensland Heron Island Research Station is situated in the island's south-west quarter. Established in the 1950s by the Great Barrier Reef Committee with the University of Queensland becoming a partner in its operations in 1970, the facility is one of the world's principal coral reef research stations, with a wide variety of research undertaken on coral reef ecology. Heron Island Research Station suffered a large fire on Friday, 30 March 2007. No one was injured.

In June 2008 the new student accommodation, comprising 80 beds, was officially opened and used for the first time by Tropical Marine Network students. The teaching laboratories and new research building with 9 research labs, library, darkroom, computer room and aquaria deck were officially reopened in February 2009.

In 2010, a state of the art climate change experimental facility was opened at the Research Station.

Sir David Attenborough and Atlantic Productions filmed segments for the documentary David Attenborough's Great Barrier Reef, at Heron Island Research Station in late 2014.

=== National Park ===
The eastern half of the island is protected and forms part of the Capricornia Cays National Park, with a permanent ranger's station onsite.

=== Harbour ===
There is a small artificial channel and wooden jetty on the western shore of the island, where the daily catamaran launch from Gladstone docks and supplies to the island are delivered. The rusted wreck of HMCS Protector lies at the entrance to the channel, and was towed to there in 1945 to form a breakwater for visiting vessels.

=== Utilities ===
The island has no fresh water supply. A small desalination plant on the island uses reverse osmosis technology to supply water for human consumption. Similarly, three diesel generators (and some solar panels) supply electricity to the island.

== Ecology ==
Heron Island has notably rich soil for a tropical coral cay, particularly in the dense southern forest. This is due to the presence of tens of thousands of wedge-tailed shearwaters (Ardenna pacifica) during breeding season. These birds disturb the humus as they dig their nesting burrows, and thus prevent the formation of Jemo soil, a phosphatic hardpan topped off by raw humus. The hardpan is formed by leaching of surface- or tree-nesting seabirds' guano in the absence of burrowing animals.

=== Flora ===
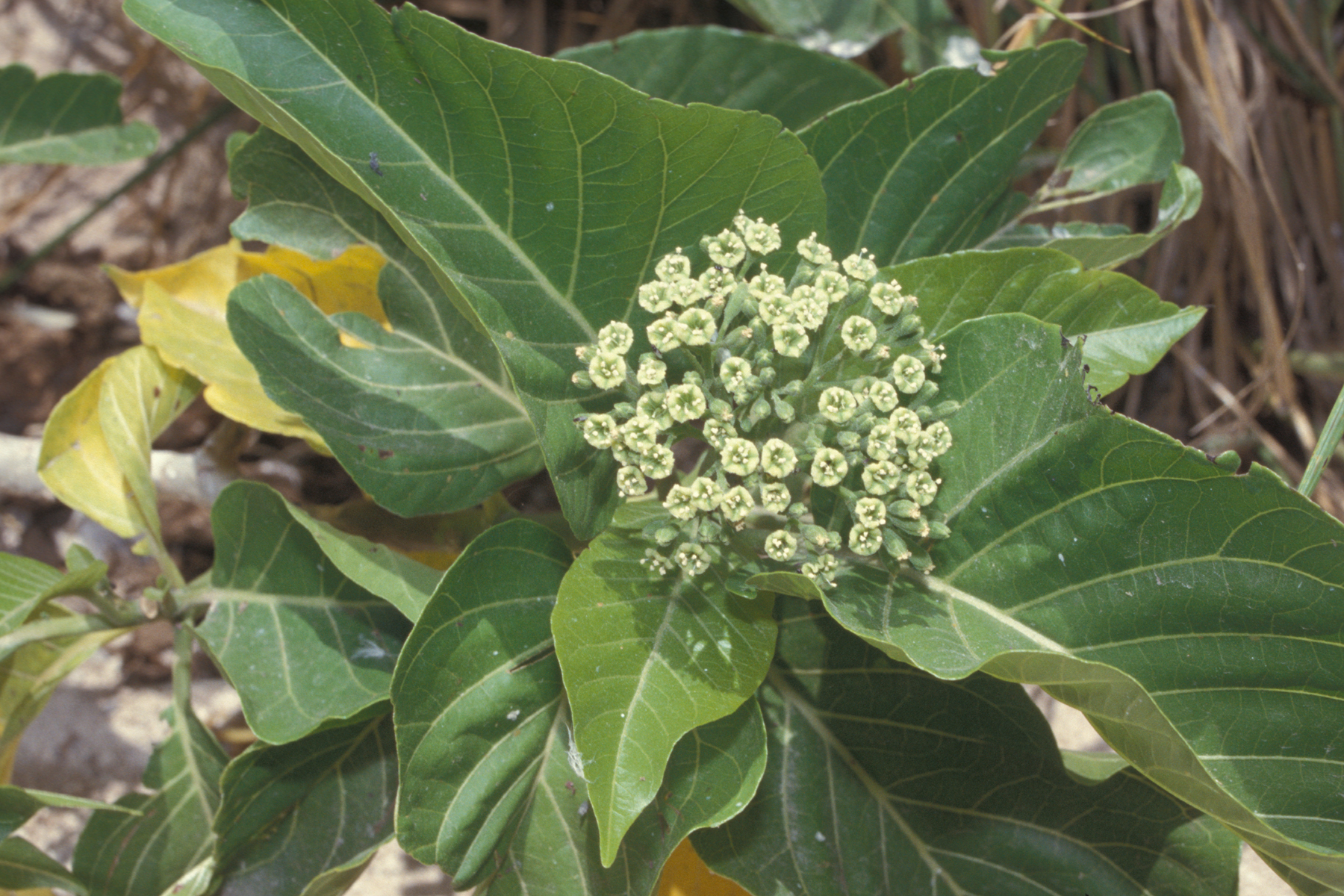
Flowers of Pisonia grandis

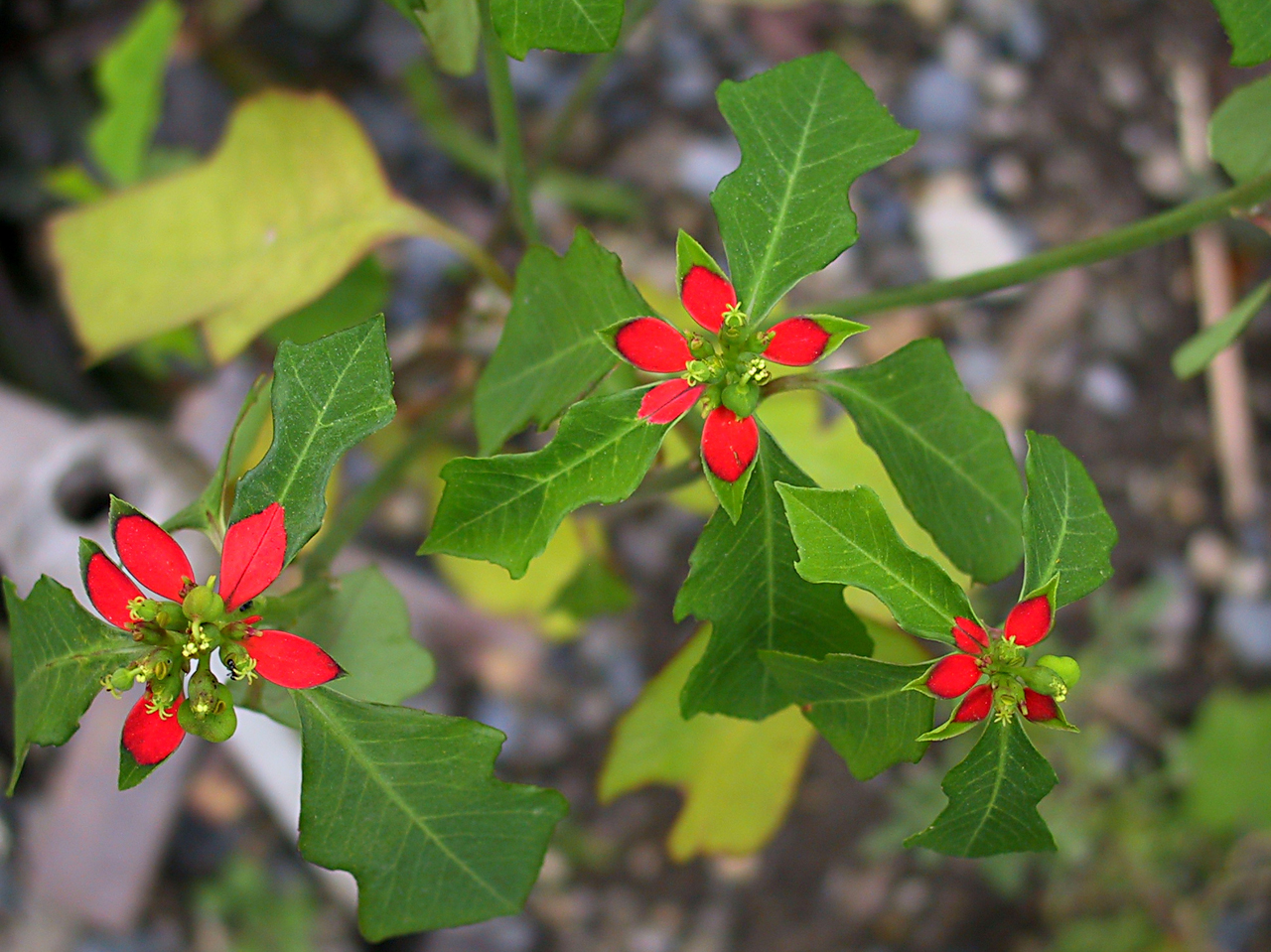
Wild poinsettia (Euphorbia cyathophora) has become extensively naturalised on Heron Island.

Rich forests of Pisonia grandis dominate the centre and south of Heron Island. Towards the eastern and north-western ends, the forest is readily accessible, but its heart is a dense tangle, interrupted only by a few trails.

Some trees in the heart of the forest grow to 10–11 m, but most are just 6–8 m high. The understory is largely absent here, formed only by scattered Celtis paniculata, Ficus opposita and Pipturus argenteus with a height of 2–4 m; some Celtis also grow higher and emerge through the Pisonia canopy. Patches of shrubs – mainly Abutilon albescens, with Wollastonia biflora (probably var. canescens), and the introduced wild poinsettia (Euphorbia cyathophora) – are found here and there. Herbaceous plants are scarce here, mainly consisting of the grass Stenotaphrum micranthum. The more open forest is composed of much the same plants, but the Pisonia does not predominate as much. A few Pandanus tectorius screwpines are also found here, and the understory is far more prominent.

North of the Pisonia forest, a band of open shrubland with some trees extends from the resort to the island's eastern tip. Octopus bush (Heliotropium foertherianum) and sea cabbage (Scaevola taccada) form the major bush cover, while Abutilon and Melanthera are the characteristic ground plants. The trees here are mainly Pandanus, but also Celtis, the she-oak Casuarina equisetifolia ssp. incana, Ficus, bay cedar (Suriana maritima). Herbs, mainly the parasitic vine Cassytha filiformis as well as Euphorbia tannensis ssp. eremophila and grasses (mainly Pacific island thintail, Lepturus repens var. subulatus), are abundant.

The eastern end is marked by a similar habitat, with mainly Casuarina, Scaevola and Heliotropium. This type of vegetation, with some Pandanus in between, extends along the southern and northern dune ridges. On the dune slopes, Boerhavia repens, Commicarpus chinensis var. chinensis (or Commicarpus australis?), the searocket Cakile edentula, yet another Euphorbia (probably Euphorbia sparrmanii), and kuroiwa grass (Thuarea involuta) are common.

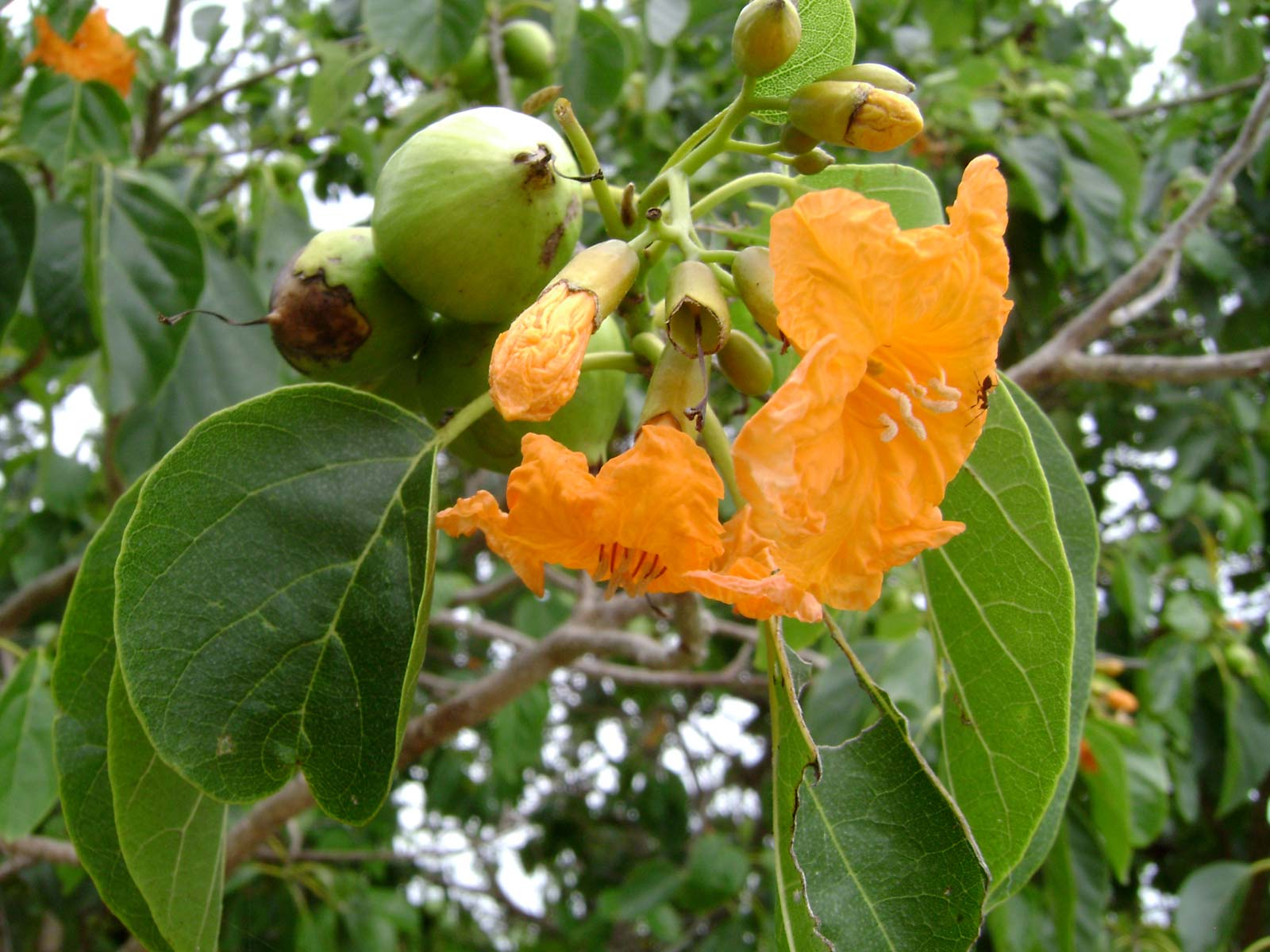
Cordia subcordata dominates the north-western forest but is rare elsewhere on the island.

East of the resort in the north-western part of Heron Island there is another type of forest, more open than the central wood. The main tree here is the manjack Cordia subcordata of which few are found elsewhere on Heron Island; Pisonia trees are present but not dominant. The Abutilon–Euphorbia cyathophora–Melanthera scrub grows thick here. Scaevola and Heliotropium as well as patches of the dropseed grass Sporobolus virginicus occur at this forest's edge.

The sea turtle nesting area is further east, making up the central part of the northern shoreside. The animals' burrowing has prevented a proper forest from forming. Consequently, though the usual tree species are found in isolated individuals, the sand is overgrown with herbs and small shrubs, mainly Cakile, Cassytha, Euphorbia eremophila, Lepturus and Melanthera.

Around the western end there is an abundance of plants introduced by the research and resort activity, some deliberately as ornamentals, others accidentally. Notable are Euphorbia cyathophora and Pseudognaphalium luteoalbum, as well as papaya (Carica papaya), coconut palm (Cocos nucifera), oleander (Nerium oleander) and temple tree (Plumeria rubra) which have been planted.

=== Fauna ===
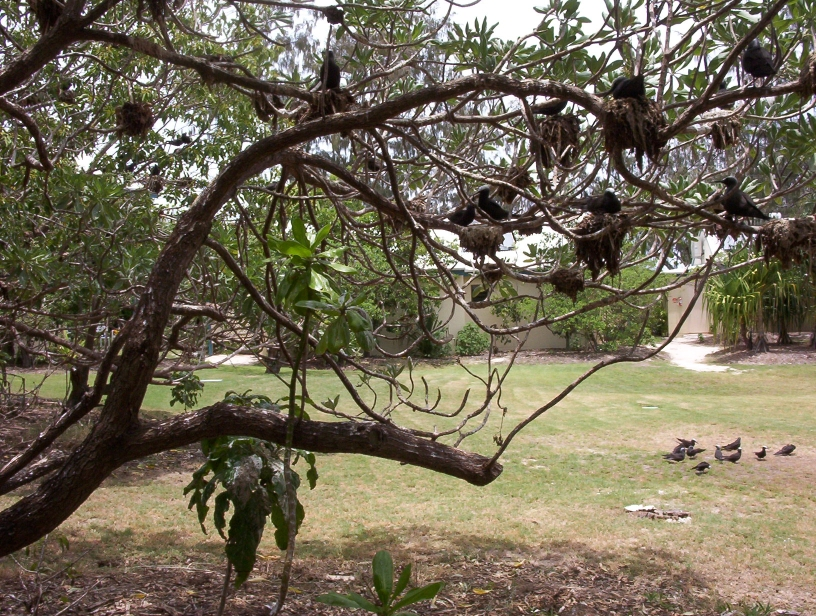
An octopus bush full of black noddy nests

Heron Island is part of the Capricornia Cays Important Bird Area. The island's forest and surrounding dunes provide habitat for thousands of nesting seabirds, including the wedge-tailed shearwater (Ardenna pacifica) and the south-western black noddy (Anous minutus minutus), during the breeding season between October and April. Over 120,000 white-capped noddies nest on the island during this period.

All-year resident and breeding on Heron Island are:

- Silver gull (Larus novaehollandiae forsteri)
- Eastern reef egret (Egretta s. sacra)
- Buff-banded rail (Gallirallus philippensis mellori)
- Bar-shouldered dove (Geopelia h. humeralis)
- Sacred kingfisher (Todiramphus s. sanctus)
- Black-faced cuckooshrike (Coracina n. novaehollandiae)
- Capricorn silvereye (Zosterops lateralis chlorocephalus)

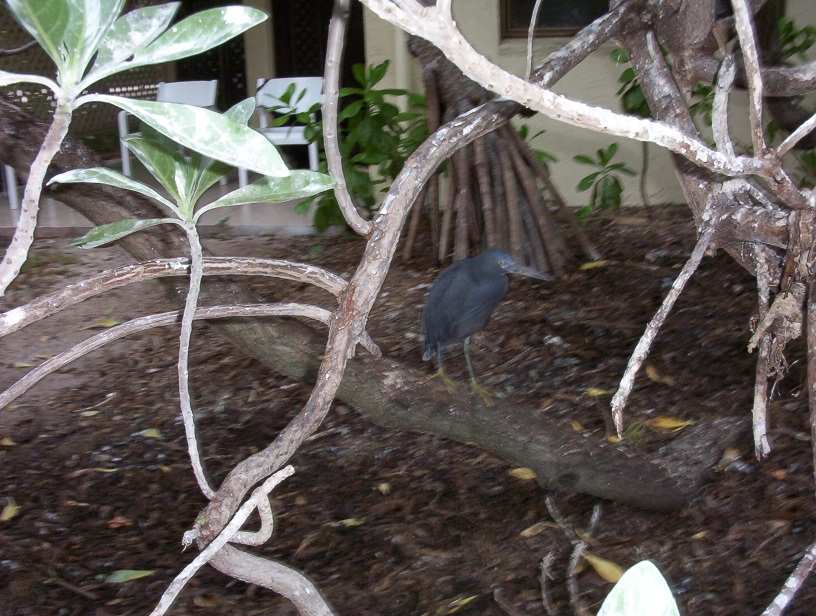
An eastern reef egret looking for noddy fledglings to eat. This is the namesake "heron" of Heron Island.

Though other herons may occasionally visit the island, the only member of the Ardeidae which is a breeding resident is the eastern reef egret. And even though the terms "heron" and "egret" are not scientific, the former is generally used to denote the large Ardea whereas the smaller Egretta species are usually called "egrets". Insofar, the only "true" heron that could ever be found on Heron Island is the white-necked heron (Ardea pacifica), which is only seen every now and then as a rare vagrant.

Since 2003, a pair of white-bellied sea eagles (Haliaeetus leucogaster) have nested on Heron Island. However, in June 2019 the tree their nest sat in fell down killing the female. As of October 2019 the male has been seen with another adult but no nest has been built.

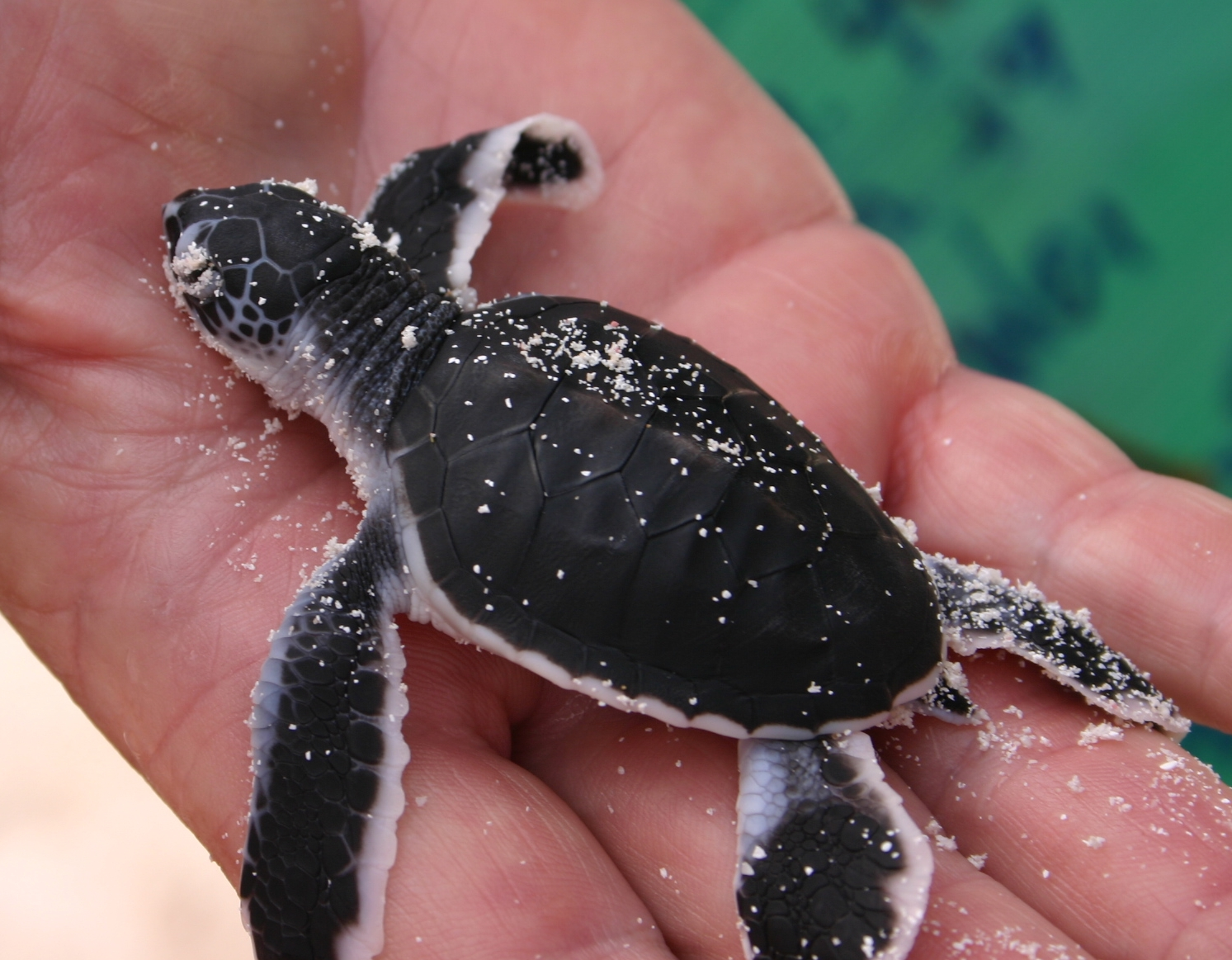
Heron Island is also famous for its green sea turtle nesting ground.

At least one species of rat, probably the widespread polynesian rat (Rattus exulans), is found on the island. Though even these small rats are known to harm island birds, this is insignificant on islands so close to a continent; while the rats probably feed on eggs and nestlings, they do not threaten the breeding bird populations as a whole.

Heron Island is also a major nesting site for green (Chelonia mydas) and Indopacific loggerhead sea turtles (Caretta caretta gigas). Around 98% of all turtles that nest on the island are green turtles, and only 2% of them will be loggerheads. The Indopacific hawksbill sea turtle (Eretmochelys imbricata bissa) has been seen on the reef but does not breed on the island. Other marine life includes the inhabitants of the coral reef, and around early October, cetaceans (e.g. humpback whales, Megaptera novaeangliae) pass Heron Island on their migration to their summer quarters in subantarctic waters.

As of June 2020, the Turtle Cooling Project is being undertaken by scientists from the World Wildlife Fund Australia, University of Queensland, Deakin University and the Queensland Government. It is looking at the effect of global warming on northern green turtle breeding, in particular the effect of producing more male turtles owing to the higher temperatures. They are working in the area around Raine Island, Heron Island and Moulter Cay.

A notable and much-studied invertebrate of Heron Island is Cerithium moniliferum, a small marine snail. These animals will form large groups as the tide recedes. Feeding on beach rock at a specific height over the average low tide level, the snails slowly move about in their clusters, preserving the precious moisture that allows them to breathe overwater.

Mosquitos and other biting insects are rare on the island. However, diseases such as avian malaria and avian pox, which are carried by biting mosquitoes have been found in low numbers in the island's silvereyes.

== Geology ==
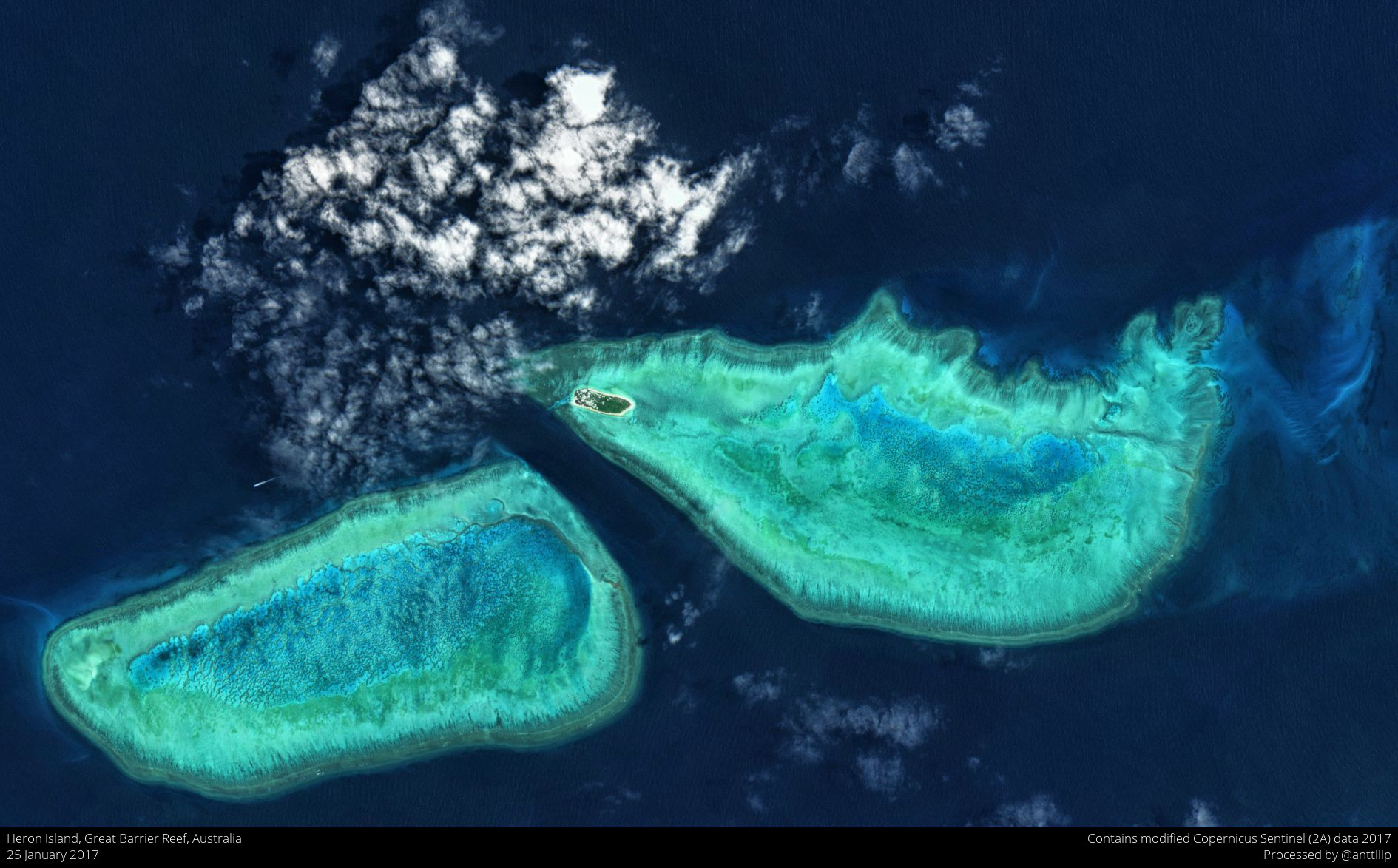
Satellite image of Heron Island and surrounding reefs on 25 January 2017

Heron Reef is a lagoonal platform reef. It has developed in a high energy environment with high tidal flows promoting water turnover and unobstructed access to the ocean. The reef dates from the Holocene period but shows evidence of possible development in the Pleistocene period. Core analysis of the reef from 1937, demonstrated a thickness of at least 15m of stacked limestone, with an eastward sloping disconformity.

== Society and culture ==
=== Known shipwrecks on the reef ===
Jane Lockhart sank between 11 and 17 December 1868. The vessel was a two-mast schooner which departed from Sydney with general cargo for Broadsound and ran aground at an uncertain location - originally stated as on Lady Musgrave reef (most unlikely), later news reports claimed a wreck on Heron Island, with some other reports mentioning the wreck on either One Tree Island or Mast Head. The crew took to the boat and safely reached the pilot station at Great Keppel Island. The vessel was built in 1861 at Ulladulla and registered in Sydney with the Official number of 36858 and a Registered number of 9/1861.

From the original reports:

One of the boats dispatched to the wreck of the Jane Lockhart, schooner, has returned with the sails and a portion of the running and standing gear. The vessel, it appears, did not strike on Bunker's Group, as reported by Captain Machen, but upon what is known as Heron Island, about ninety miles to the northward of Bunker's Group. When the boat reached the vessel she was settled in a hollow in one of the reefs, the outer formation of the hollow acting as a breakwater against the seas. One side of the vessel was quite visible, and the new copper sheathing appeared uninjured. Captain Norris, who went down in charge of the boat, unbent the sails, so that the position of the vessel might as much as possible remain unaltered; he left the yards and masts standing.

and six months later it was reported as:

The Rose, schooner, has returned from the wreck of the Jane Lockhart, on Masthead Reef, whither she went on 15 June Captain Dwyer informs us that the Jane Lockhart still lies in a very snug position, and he has no doubt but that himself, and Mr Norris, the purchaser of the wreck, will be able, ultimately, to raise the vessel and bring her safely to Rockhampton

Nearly the whole of the period that they were at the reef, very heavy weather prevailed, staving operations towards the recovery of the cargo, but luckily the strong SE winds lulled for about three days Captain Dwyer availed himself of the occasion, set to work, rigged up a staging between the masts of the Lockhart, schooner, and by means of a rope and a South Sea Island diver, managed to bring up from eighty to ninety large iron pulley wheels, besides a quantity of machinery and sundries, comprising Ale, porter, liqueur brandy, cutlery, ironmongery, etc Unfortunately the Roses water ran out, much to the chagrin of the crew, who would have raised a great deal more, only having to run into port for supplies.

=== Voyager spacecraft ===
A photo of Heron Island is included on the Voyager Golden Record which was sent past the limits of the Solar System aboard the Voyager 1 and Voyager 2 spacecraft. The photo of Heron Island was selected as one of the examples that portrayed the diversity of life and culture on Earth.
