= Ida Browne =

Australian geologist (1900–1976)

Ida Alison Browne
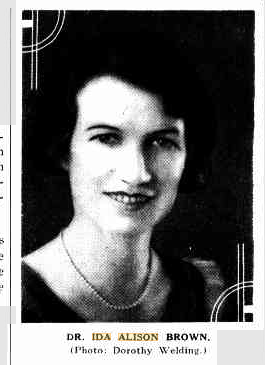
- Ida Browne in Sydney, 1932
- Born: Ida Alison Brown; 16 August 1900; Paddington, Sydney, Australia
- Died: 21 October 1976 (aged 76); Edgecliff, Sydney, Australia
- Other names: Ida Brown
- Occupation: Geologist
- Known for: Mapping, palaeontology

Ida Alison Browne (16 August 1900 – 21 October 1976) was an Australian geologist, petrologist and paleontologist at the University of Sydney.

== Early life and education ==
Ida Alison Brown was born 16 August 1900 in Paddington, Sydney, New South Wales. She was educated at Fort Street Girls' High School, and went on to study her B.Sc. at the University of Sydney. She graduated in 1922 with first class Honours and the university medal in geology and mineralogy and second class Honours in mathematics, having also won Professor David's prize for geology and mineralogy and the Deas Thomson scholarship for mineralogy.

== Career ==
Giving up the scholarship in 1922 at the request of Professor Edgeworth David, she worked as a demonstrator in geology and petrology at the university until 1927, and researched the minerals of Broken Hill and geology of the south coast of New South Wales. After being awarded a Linnean-Macleay Fellowship in geology from 1927 to 1932 she further worked on the geology of this region, undertook extensive mapping, travelled overseas visiting research institutes and attending scientific congresses.

Brown took her D.Sc. in 1932 with her thesis “The Geology of the South Coast of New South Wales, with special reference to the Origin and Relationships of the Igneous Rocks”, the second woman to do so at the University of Sydney. At this time, women were forbidden from working underground, making employment difficult to find. She returned to the university, working again as a demonstrator until 1934. While working as a demonstrator she was appointed a Delegate of the Commonwealth Government and Australian National Research Council to attend the Fourth Pacific Science Congress in Canada. Following the illness of W.S. Dun in 1934, she became Assistant Lecturer in palaeontology. She spent considerable time developing her knowledge of paleontology to the exclusion of other geological research as well as carrying a full teaching load, teaching notable Australian geologists Beryl Nashar and Joan Crockford-Beattie. Brown was promoted to full lecturer in 1940, and in 1941 published a paper on the fossiliferous Silurian and Devonian sequences of the Yass district with Germaine Joplin. She attempted to work with colleague, Dorothy Hill from the University of Queensland to publish internationally, but mainly focused on Australian publications and her teaching responsibilities. Moving from hard rock to soft rock studies, Brown's research evolved into the study of Paleozoic invertebrates, specifically brachiopods, as well as stratigraphical studies. She became a Senior Lecturer in 1945, but like many women, Ida Brown resigned from teaching in 1950 with her marriage to fellow geologist and colleague, William Rowan Browne.

== Later life ==
William and Ida Browne worked from their home residence, undertaking fieldwork when required up until 1965. She published ten papers after her marriage to Browne. She assisted him on his field trips to Kosciusko and he assisted her on field trips to Yass and other regions of New South Wales. She was a member of the Royal Society of New South Wales and Linnean Society of New South Wales, and was the first woman president of the Linnean Society in 1945. She was the first woman to give an address at a meeting the Royal Society of New South Wales in July 1934, Vice President of the Royal Society of New South Wales from 1942 to 1950, Honorary Editorial Secretary from 1950 to 1953 and first woman President in 1953. She was a member of the Australian National Research Council, ANZAAS and Geological Society of Australia. She also supported the creation of the William Rowan Browne medal to honour her husband's legacy.

Browne suffered from a paralysing illness from 1970 and died 21 October 1976 in Edgecliff, New South Wales. Her husband had predeceased her the previous year.

== Legacy ==
Ida Browne dedicated her life to teaching and providing adequate resources for the geologists and palaeontologists of the future. She generously donated books to build the geological libraries at the University of Wollongong and the Australian Museum, taught and mentored young women and promoted palaeontology. She excelled in the field and undertook basic geological mapping prior to World War II when very Australian geology was poorly understood. Her detailed mapping and stratigraphy work made a substantive contribution to Australian geology, and her map of Taemas is still in use.
