= Getson =

Getson is an English language surname. It is a variant of Jutson.

Notable people with this surname include:

- Carolyn Bolivar-Getson (born 1964), Canadian politician from Nova Scotia
- Shane Getson (born 1973), Canadian politician from Alberta
