= Brünnich (surname) =

Brünnich is a surname. Notable people with the surname include:

- Morten Thrane Brünnich (1737–1827), Danish zoologist and mineralogist
- Johannes Christian Brunnich (1861–1933), Australian agricultural chemist

== See also ==
- Andreas Brünniche (1704–1769), Danish portrait painter
