= Australasian Palaeontological Memoirs =

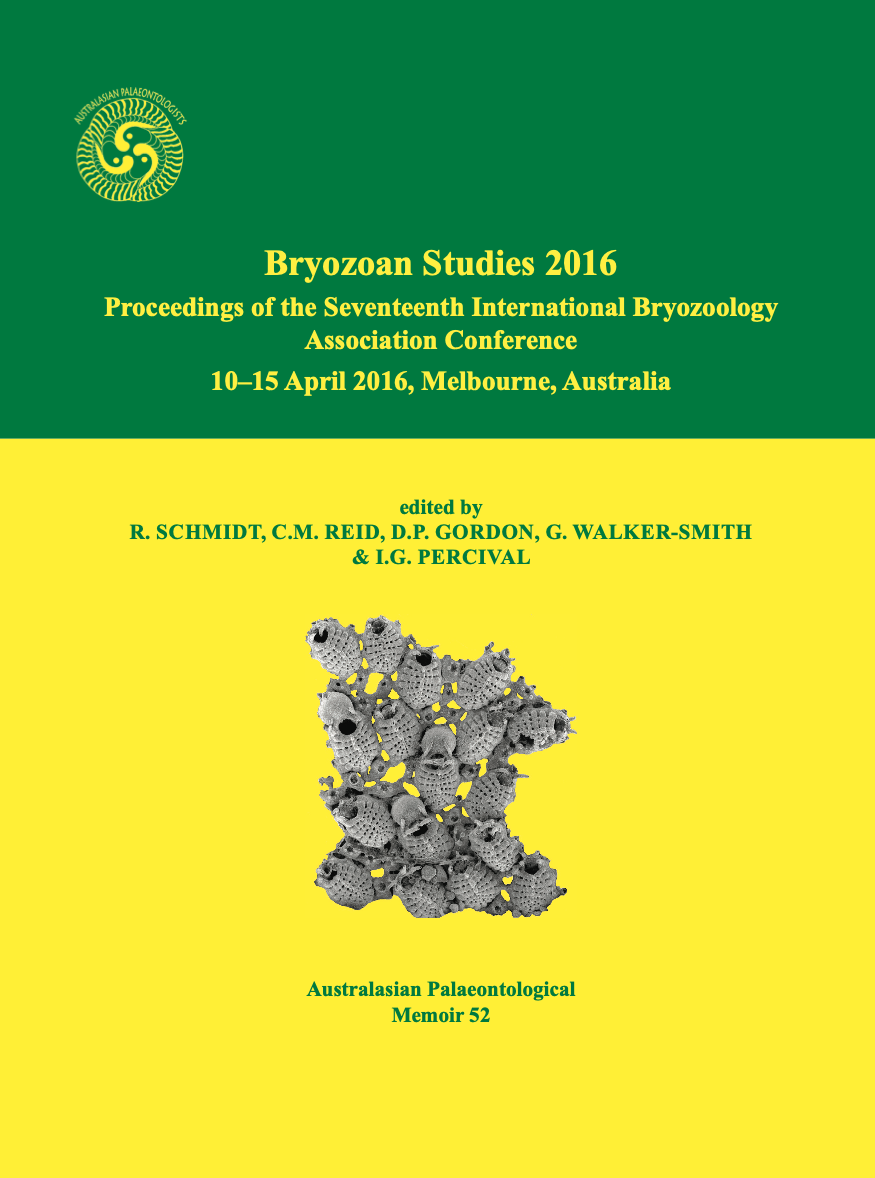
- Front cover of Australasian Palaeontological Memoir 52 (2019)
- Discipline: Palaeontology
- Language: English
- Edited by: Ian Percival

Publication details
- Former name: Memoirs of the Association of Australasian Palaeontologists
- History: 1983–present
- Publisher: Association of Australasian Palaeontologists (Australia)
- Frequency: Irregular, as needed

Standard abbreviations
- ISO 4: Australas. Palaeontol. Mem.

Indexing
- ISSN: 2205-8877

Links
- Journal homepage

Australasian Palaeontological Memoirs (formerly Memoirs of the Association of Australasian Palaeontologists) is a peer-reviewed scientific monographic series covering all aspects of palaeontology in the Australasian region. The memoir series is designed for longer monographic treatments, but will also consider thematic sets of papers and commonly publishes conference proceedings.

== History ==
The memoirs were initiated in 1983 as the Memoirs of the Association of Australasian Palaeontologists as a monographic series published by AAP. In 2015 their series title was changed to Australasian Palaeontological Memoirs. It is published directly through the Association of Australasian Palaeontologists.
