= Ethel Raybould =

Mathematician from Australia

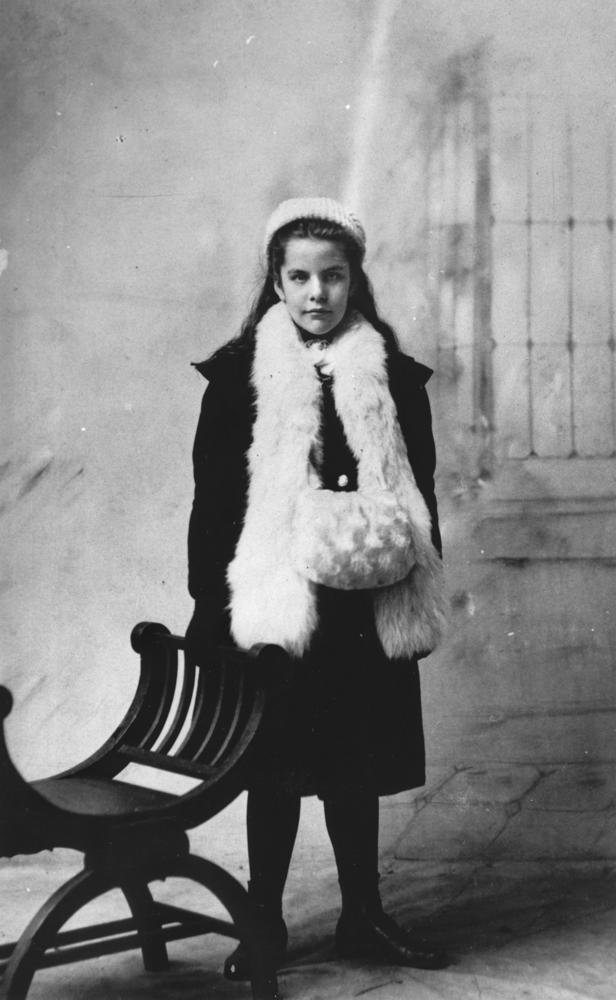
- Raybould as a child (1911 photo)
- Born: 31 July 1899; Brisbane, Queensland, Australia
- Died: 17 January 1987 (aged 87)
- Education: University of Queensland
- Scientific career
- Fields: Mathematician

Ethel Harriet Raybould (1899–1987) was the University of Queensland's first female mathematics lecturer who taught at the University from 1928 to 1955. She was one of the University's most generous benefactors with her bequest to the University of almost $1 million upon her death supporting fellowships, prizes, and a teaching facility.

== Education ==
Ethel Harriet Raybould was born on 31 July 1899 in Brisbane, Queensland. She was brought up in Paddington, Brisbane While a student at Petrie Terrace State School, the Head of the school noticed her intelligence and dedication to her studies and she was appointed a Pupil-Teacher at the age of 14, while she completed her senior school studies. She worked as an Assistant Teacher in domestic science studies at Kangaroo Point (Girls) School, Mundubbera State School, Rockhampton High, Domestic Science High, Bulimba State School, and Central Technical College (now QUT). She would attend night classes at the Central Technical College, studying physics, whilst teaching domestic science at the College during the day.

In 1921, Raybould won a teacher scholarship to the University of Queensland. She completed her B.A. in mathematics part-time whilst teaching domestic science, and took a year away from her teaching duties to take first class honours in mathematics in 1927. She was awarded the University Gold Medal in 1927, only the 10th person to receive it.

== Career ==
In 1928, Raybould was seconded to the University of Queensland by the Department of Public Instruction, as a temporary lecturer in pure mathematics. In 1931, she was appointed as a permanent lecturer in the Department, one of the few women to be employed as such by UQ. She took her M.A. in 1931 with a thesis in mathematics on "The Transfinite and its Significance in Analysis". From 1937 to 1939 she undertook postgraduate study at Columbia University She returned to the University as Lecturer and later Senior Lecturer from 1951 to 1955. She retired in 1955

Raybould died in 1987 and left her estate to the University of Queensland.

== Legacy ==
The Ethel Harriet Raybould Trust was established at the University in 1988. Two Fellowships were made available from the money - the Raybould Tutorial Fellowship and the Raybould Visiting Fellowship. The Fellowships provide an opportunity for people to work in a university mathematics department and to develop a project that supports senior secondary mathematics. A prize is also given in her name.

The Raybould lecture theatre was constructed with part of the bequest and was opened in 1990. Another portion of the estate went to the Dorothy Hill Engineering and Sciences Library which sits adjacent to the lecture theatre.
