= Walter Heywood Bryan =

Australian geologist, educator, and military veteran

- Born: 26 August 1891; Brisbane, Queensland, Australia
- Died: 10 March 1966 (aged 74)
- Education: Ipswich Grammar School, University of Queensland
- Awards: Military Cross
- Scientific career
- Fields: Geologist

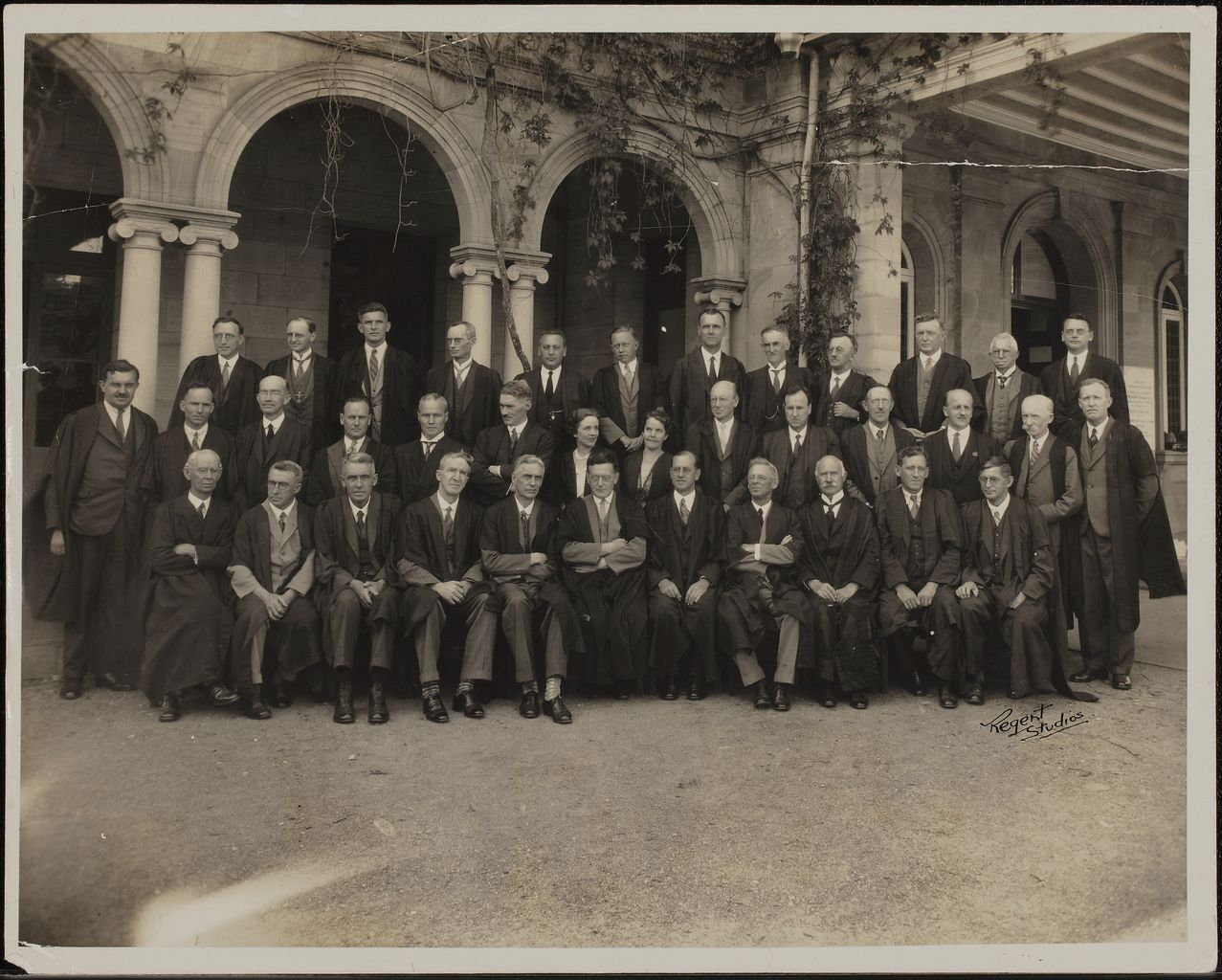
This is an image of University of Queensland staff in 1927. W.H. Bryan is in the second row, fourth from the left. Used with the permission of Fryer Library, University of Queensland Photograph Collection, UQFL466, AL/P/66

Walter Heywood (W.H.) Bryan (1891–1966) was an Australian geologist, educator and decorated military veteran. He founded the University of Queensland Seismology Station, and was the first student at the University of Queensland to receive a Doctor of Science (D.Sc.) degree. He served with distinction during World War I.

== Early life ==
Bryan was born in Taringa, Brisbane in 1891. He was educated at Ipswich Grammar School. After high school he enrolled in the newly formed University of Queensland in 1911 and graduated with a BSc in 1914. He would take his Honours in Geology and Mineralogy, studying the petrology of Enoggera granite. He spent a short time in the Queensland Geological Survey in 1914–15 mapping the Maryborough basin and the petrology of the Gympie Permian. He was awarded his MSc from the University of Queensland while he was overseas serving in the Australian Imperial Force (AIF).

== Military service ==
Bryan enlisted in the AIF in 1915 and served as a gunner at Gallipoli and in France. He served at Gallipoli, in Egypt and on the Western Front, with 1 Division Trench Mortar Batteries and Artillery. He was awarded the Military Cross for conspicuous heroism under fire. He would be the vice-chairman of the University of Queensland's War Memorial Committee following WW1.

== Marriage ==
In 1919 following WW1, he married fellow Australian, Myee Harrison, in London.

== Career ==
Bryan undertook postgraduate study at the University of Cambridge for a year in 1919. He returned to Australia and was appointed a lecturer at the University of Queensland in geology in 1921. He gave many public lectures in Brisbane on geological topics, including the origins of the earth, coral reefs and prehistoric man. His geological interests were strongest in the origin of and the relationship between continents and oceans. He was President of the Royal Society of Queensland in 1925. In 1926, he received his D.Sc., the first student of the University of Queensland to do so. His D.Sc. thesis would be on earth movements in Queensland. When Professor Henry Caselli Richards was on study leave to the U.S. in the mid-1930s, Bryan acted as Professor in his stead, answering questions related to earthquakes in particular. Bryan and Richards would have a productive working relationship, co-publishing a number of publications on the Silverwood-Lucky Valley area and on the Brisbane Tuff.

Following the 1935 earthquake in Gayndah, Queensland, a seismological station was set up at the University of Queensland. Earthquakes in Queensland being rare and this one being of significant strength to be felt at a great distance, Bryan's enthusiasm for establishing a means of researching seismic activity in Queensland, inspired willing benefactors to get involved. Two Milne-Shaw seismographs were donated to the university in quick succession. These were followed by other seismographs, enabling greater study of seismic activity in Queensland and overseas. Bryan would become the Officer in Charge of the UQ Seismology Station for many years. His enthusiasm for this research, commitment to the station and the results it collected, represent the second longest running experiment at the University of Queensland to date – after the Pitch drop experiment initiated by Thomas Parnell. Bryan and his colleague, Owen A. Jones later argued for further stations to be added to the north of Queensland to assist with accurate weather forecasting of cyclone events, earthquakes and sea disturbances. He and Dorothy Hill would work on new hypotheses to explain the growth of corals in the 1940s.

Bryan was the W.B. Clarke Memorial Lecturer of the Royal Society of New South Wales in 1944. He was president of the Geological section of ANZAAS in 1946 and foundation member and first Chairman of the Queensland division of the Geological Society of Australia. He was a representative of the University Senate on the Soldiers' Children Education Board following WW2. He was Deputy Chairman of the Great Barrier Reef Committee for many years, Editor of the Royal Society of Queensland's journal and Patron of the Gemological Association of Queensland. In 1937 he was President of the Queensland Naturalists Club, and for some years the President of the Men's Graduate Association. In 1945, he was president of the Royal Society of Queensland. After the death of Professor Henry Richards, Bryan would become the second Professor of the Department of Geology in 1948. Bryan was well liked in his department and proved to be a skilled lecturer, mentor and administrator on behalf of the Geology Department. He would publish almost 60 papers during his career. He would retire from the university in 1959 and become Emeritus Professor in his retirement. He was still writing papers on spherulites at his death and reviewing the work of others.

== Later life ==
Bryan died in 1966. He was survived by his wife and four children. All of their children would graduate from the University of Queensland. His son Bill Bryan would work in forestry, son Harrison Bryan would become the head of the University of Queensland Library and University of Sydney and later Director-General of the National Library of Australia, daughter Margaret Bryan would go into "letters" and son Bob Bryan into geology as his father had done.

== Legacy ==
The UQ Seismology Station that he started, continues to this day at Mount Nebo. In 1991, the University of Queensland W.H. Bryan Mining and Geology Research Centre was established and named for him. It is part of the Sustainable Minerals Institute of which his son Bob was a founding director.

== Papers ==
- Bryan, W. H. (1914). Geology and petrology of the Enoggera Granite and the allied intrusives, part I. General Geology. Proceedings of the Royal Society of Queensland, 26: 141–162.
- Bryan, W. H. (1918). Geology and petrology of the Enoggera Granite and the allied intrusives, part II. Petrology. Proceedings of the Royal Society of Queensland, 34: 123–160.
- Bryan, W. H. (1925). A glossary of Queensland stratigraphy. Special publication of the University of Queensland Department of Geology: 1–69.
- Bryan, W. H. and Massey, C. H. (1926). The geological range of the Tiaro series. Proceedings of the Royal Society of Queensland, 37: 108–120.
- Bryan, W. H. and Whitehouse, F. W. (1929). A record of Devonian Rhyolites in Queensland. Proceedings of the Royal Society of Queensland, 41: 133–138.
- Bryan, W. H. (1939). The red earth residuals and their significance in south-eastern Queensland. Proceedings of the Royal Society of Queensland, 50: 21–32.
- Bryan, W. H. and Jones, O.A. (1944). A revised glossary of Queensland stratigraphy. Papers of the Department of Geology, University of Queensland, 2 (11): 1–77.
- Bryan, W. H. and Jones, O. A. (1946). The geological history of Queensland: a stratigraphical outline. Papers of the Department of Geology, University of Queensland, 2 (12): 1–103.
- Bryan, W. H. (1950). Notes on the early tertiary basalts of south-eastern Queensland. Journal of the Royal Society of N.S.W., 92: 129–132.
- Bryan, W. H. and Jones, O. A. (1954). Contributions to the geology of Brisbane, no.2. The structural history of the Brisbane Metamorphics. Proceedings of the Royal Society of Queensland, 65: 25–50.
- Bryan, W. H. (1959). New names in Queensland stratigraphy. Silverwood area. Australian oil and gas journal, 5 (11): 31–32.
