= Beryl Nashar =

Australian geologist

Beryl Nashar AO, OBE
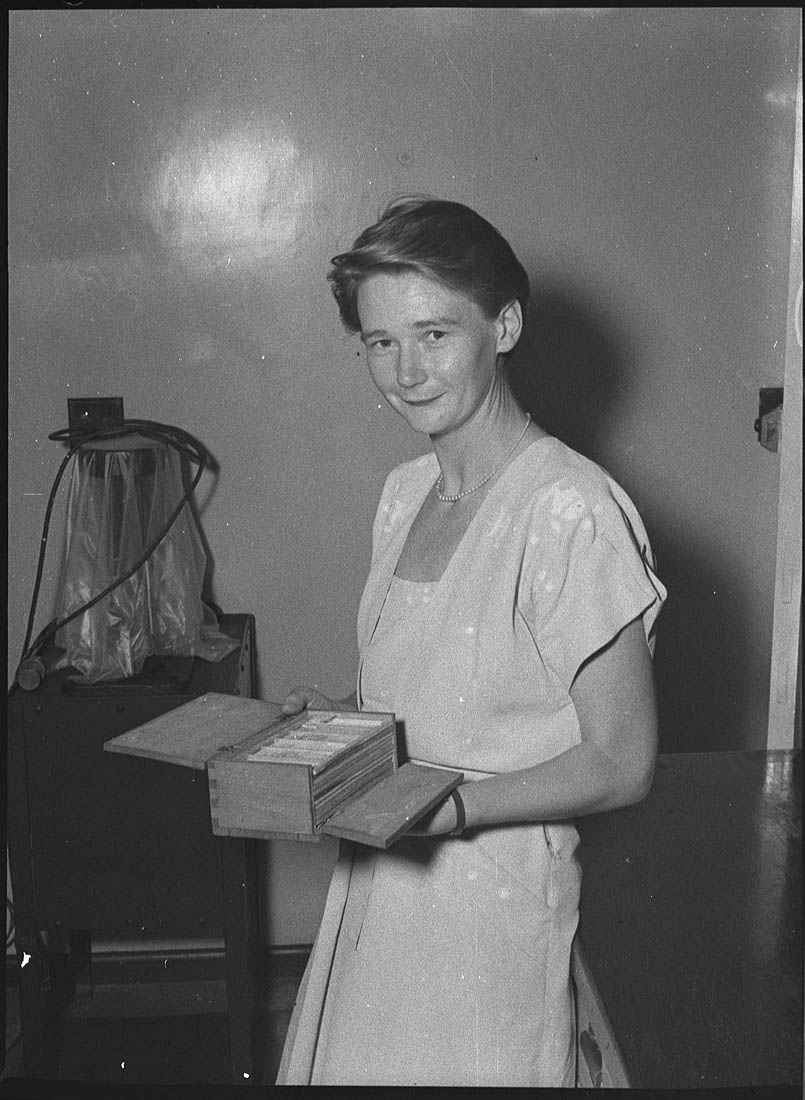
- Beryl Nashar, 1955
- Born: Beryl Scott; 9 July 1923; Maryville, New South Wales, Australia
- Died: 5 May 2012 (aged 88); Newcastle, New South Wales, Australia
- Other name: Beryl El Nashar
- Education: University of Sydney; University of Tasmania
- Spouse: Ali El-Nashar
- Awards: Officer of the Order of the British Empire (1972); Officer of the Order of Australia (2002)
- Scientific career
- Fields: Geology
- Workplaces: University of Newcastle
- Thesis: The petrology of the Cambrian volcanic rocks of Tasmania (1953)
- Doctoral advisor: Samuel Warren Carey

Beryl Scott Nashar AO, OBE (9 July 1923 – 5 May 2012) was an Australian geologist, academic and first female Dean at an Australian university.

== Early life and education ==
She was born Beryl Scott on 9 July 1923 in Maryville, New South Wales. She grew up in the Newcastle area, the eldest of four children and attended Cardiff Public School and Newcastle Girls High School. She completed her Leaving Certificate, coming first in the state in geology. She received a scholarship to attend the University of Sydney, winning a prize each year and took her B.Sc. with Honours in 1947. Her early research looked at the geology of the Stanhope region of the Hunter Valley, near Newcastle. She would later study mineralogy, geochemistry and the formation of minerals in andesitic rocks within the eastern parts of New South Wales.

== Early career ==
Beryl Scott worked as a staff demonstrator during her B.Sc., continuing her study toward an Honours degree. She won the University medal and a research scholarship. She took a Dip.Ed. from the University of Sydney in 1948. Although appointed to work as a teacher at Hunter Girls High School after graduation, Scott was offered a teaching position at the University of Tasmania, and she took this job whilst working toward her PhD. Her supervisor was Professor Samuel Warren Carey.

During her time at the University of Tasmania, Scott won a Rotary Fellowship, the first to be given to a woman to attend the University of Cambridge, and in 1949 studied there in the Department of Mineralogy and Petrology. Scott counted Germaine Joplin as an inspiration to her studies whilst at Cambridge. She met Ali El-Nashar, an Egyptian philosophy student who was also studying his PhD at Cambridge, and they married in 1952 after she completed her PhD at the University of Tasmania, the first woman to earn a PhD in geology from an Australian university. Following her marriage in Cairo, Egypt, Scott who was now known as Beryl Nashar, returned to Australia to give birth to their son, Tarek in 1953, while her husband remained in Spain, Lebanon and later Egypt. Ali El-Nashar was not able to find work in Australia.

An ambitious Nashar accepted a lecturing position at the Newcastle University College (then part of NSW University of Technology) in 1955, and was steadily promoted to senior lecturer, and associate professor. She became the foundation Professor of Geology in 1965, only the second woman to be promoted to a Professorial position at that time, after Dorothy Hill of the University of Queensland. When the college became the University of Newcastle in 1969, Nashar became the first female Dean at an Australian university.

== Later life and awards ==
A longtime Newcastle resident, and with a strong ethic toward public service, Nashar sat on the board of directors of the Royal Newcastle Hospital for over 16 years, as well as the Faculty of Medicine. She was also on the Board of the Greater Newcastle Building Society. She was president of the Australian Federation of Business and Professional Women in 1964 and president of the International Federation of Business and Professional Women in 1974. She received an OBE in 1972. She was on the Secondary Schools Board from 1970–1975. She was appointed Woman of the Year by the NSW branch of the United Nations Association in 1975. She retired from the University of Newcastle in 1980, intending to join her husband, but Ali El-Nashar died the same year. Nashar was appointed Emeritus Professor. She sat on the Academic Committee of the Higher Education Board from 1982–1987. She also sat on the Committee that looked into the establishment of the University of Western Sydney. In 1999 she received the Rotary Foundations' Scholar Alumni Service award. She received a Commonwealth Recognition Award for Senior Australians in 2001 and was made an Officer of the Order of Australia in 2002 for "service to the community, particularly through raising awareness of issues affecting women, and to education". She was also awarded an Honorary D.Sc. in 1988. A portrait of her was submitted to the Archibald Prize in 1968.

Nashar published four books and 30 papers during her career.

Nashar died on 5 May 2012 in Newcastle, New South Wales. She was survived by her son and his family, and her siblings.

== Legacy ==
An annual scholarship is given in her name from the University of Newcastle, The Beryl Nashar Scholarship for Excellence in Geology. The name of this scholarship has been changed to the Beryl Nashar Young Researcher Award.

In 2021, the Geological Society of Australia introduced the Beryl Nashar Award to recognise the contributions of an Australian woman geologist of any age who has made a significant contribution to any field(s) of geology and the geological profession in general.
