= Clive Selwyn Davis =

Australian mathematician and veteran (1916-2009)

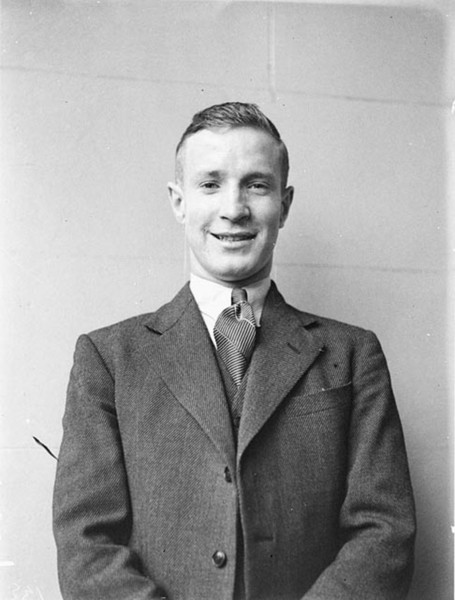
- Davis in 1934
- Born: 15 April 1916; Sydney, Australia
- Died: 29 October 2009 (aged 93)

Academic background
- Education: University of Sydney, Trinity College, Cambridge

Academic work
- Discipline: Mathematician

Clive Selwyn Davis (15 April 1916 – 29 October 2009) was an Australian mathematician who served as Professor in Mathematics at the University of Queensland. He took his PhD in mathematics at the University of Cambridge, and upon his return to Australia worked to improve the study of mathematics at the University of Queensland over the next 30 years.

== Education ==
Clive Selwyn Davis was born in Sydney, Australia. He and his family of four siblings lived in the Strathfield area. He attended Summer Hill and Homebush primary schools and then went to Sydney Technical High School. He enrolled at the University of Sydney, at first being attached to Engineering, before transferring to Science. He took a First Class Honours degree in Mathematics in 1937, followed by First Class Honours in Physics in 1938 and a M.Sc. in 1939. After World War II, he obtained a scholarship to Trinity College, Cambridge and was awarded his PhD in number theory in 1949, under the supervision of Louis Mordell.

== Military ==
At the University of Sydney, Davis joined the Air Squadron there in 1936. He trained as a pilot in the Royal Australian Air Force Reserve. After completing his M.Sc. he travelled to England on a CSIR post-graduate scholarship to conduct research on aircraft instruments and aerodynamics at the Royal Aircraft Establishment in Farnborough, intending to return to Australia and work at the Aeronautical Research Laboratories. When World War II began, he volunteered in the RAF and served with distinction in two tours of the Middle East and Europe. and was awarded a Distinguished Flying Cross in 1941. As a scientist and pilot he was involved in developing and deploying radar. He worked for the air Ministry in a new special unit which monitored and oversaw developments deployed in fighter and bomber commands. He later transferred to the RAAF, and returned to Australia.

He would serve on the Air Staff of the RAAF, and was mentioned in the official war history for his role in the development of operations research. In the last part of the war, he commanded 103 Squadron of Liberator heavy bombers, in their operations from North Queensland and Papua New Guinea. He retired with the rank of Wing Commander.

== Career ==
After the war, Davis took his PhD at Cambridge and resumed his career in mathematics . He lectured at the University of Bristol for seven years and was then appointed the chair of Mathematics at the University of Queensland in 1956, following on from Henry James Priestley and Eugene Francis Simonds. He led the Mathematics Department there for 27 years, retiring in 1983.

Davis campaigned for his new Department, finding that it was at least 20 years behind other universities he had attended. He fought for a new building for the Department, improving teaching with the introduction of a separate Honours stream, tutorial classes and recruiting new staff . He fought for a separate Mathematics Library, which when it was formed, was named in his honour. ( It was later absorbed by the Dorothy Hill Engineering and Sciences Library at UQ in 1997. His name remains attached to the collection, as does Dorothy Hill and Thomas Parnell, whose Geology and Physics libraries respectively were absorbed by the new library.) He was a member of the University Senate for 10 years, and was active in setting up the FSSU superannuation scheme. He served on the University Research Committee, for seven years, three as Chairman. He was President of the Royal Society of Queensland in 1966. He was Treasurer of the Australian Mathematical Society from 1956 to 1968, and its President from 1968 to 1970.

He was a founding member of the Great Barrier Reef Committee and Wildlife Preservation Society of Queensland.

He published papers from 1945 until 1951, with his PhD being featured in Acta Mathematica. He returned to scholarly publishing in 1978.

Davis married Antoinette "Toni" Lowing in Melbourne in 1943; they had three children, and later adopted a sont. Clive Davis died in 2009
