= Horace Waring =

English/Australian zoologist

Horace Waring (17 December 1910 – 9 August 1980) was an English/Australian zoologist, winner of the Clarke Medal of the Royal Society of New South Wales in 1962.

Waring was born in Toxteth Park, Liverpool, England, and was educated at the University of Liverpool (B.Sc., 1931; M.Sc., 1933). He was appointed the head of the department of zoology at the University of Birmingham in 1946. On 1 May 1948, Waring was appointed professor of zoology at the University of Western Australia.

Waring's field of research was in reproductive physiology, particularly the immunological competence and endocrine function of the development of the pouched embryo.

He was awarded the Mueller Medal by ANZAAS in 1980.

Awards
Preceded by Charles Austin Gardner	Clarke Medal; 1962	Succeeded by Germaine Joplin
