= Bob Bryan (geologist) =

Australian geologist

Robert (Bob) Bryan, AM, is an Australian geologist who worked extensively in outback Queensland and Western Australia early in his career and has had a long-term involvement in the property and mining industries in Australia and South East Asia. His lifelong achievements in mining in Australia were recognised when he was inducted into the Queensland Business Leaders Hall of Fame in 2009 and the award of an honorary doctorate from the University of Queensland in 2010.

== History ==
Robert Bryan is the son of Walter Heywood Bryan, a former Professor of Geology and Mineralogy at the University of Queensland.

In 1983 Bryan founded Pan Australian Mining Ltd (now the $740 million Pan Australian Resources) and, as managing director, oversaw the development of a major gold mine at Mount Leyshon, near Charters Towers in Queensland. He was also chairman of Highlands Pacific, a mineral explorer in Papua New Guinea. Bryan became the first honorary life member of the then Queensland Mining Council (QMC) in November 1995. His membership was on the recommendation of the Executive Committee which referred to Bryan's personal contribution to the formation of the Council. Bryan was involved in 18 months of discussions and negotiations to bring about the merger of the Queensland Coal Association and the Queensland Chamber of Mines in 1991. Bryan is also a founding Director of the Sustainable Minerals Institute and the Bryan Research Centre within the University of Queensland. He achieved considerable success in the role of founding chairman for the Queensland Gas Company. In an article, "I'm Going Sailing", in The Deal, December 2008, Bryan wrote:

"The trick was to find thick coal seams where the gas could accumulate… from years of drilling in the Surat Basin… I knew of a number of drilling rigs that had caught fire after encountering gas. Safety procedures were pretty rudimentary then. The drillers would smoke when it took their fancy. Up would come the gas, and bang went the rig. We identified where half a dozen rigs had been lost over the years. It was a rather crude prospecting tool, but it worked."

Bryan formed a partnership with Dick Groves, a consultant geologist and his partner Bob Bell, and after a shaky start (described as "far more ideas than money"), Bryan recruited Richard Cottee as managing director. The company's value rose from a market cap of less than $20 million to $5.6 billion in eight years to become a leading coal seam gas producer in Queensland.

Bob's private company, Leyshon Pty Ltd is now focussing on property funds management, investment and development.
