= Carl Süssmilch =

Australian geologist and educationist

Adolph Carl von de Heyde Süssmilch (12 February 1875 – 6 December 1946), also known as Adolph Carl Süssmilch, was an Australian geologist and educationist.

Süssmilch was born in Sydney, New South Wales, to German immigrants. He worked as an indent clerk and studied science part-time at Sydney Technical College, where he later taught geology and mining.

His first scientific paper (on basic plutonic rocks near Kiama) was published in the Royal Society of New South Wales journal in 1905. In 1911 he published what was to become a widely used textbook: An Introduction to the Geology of New South Wales. The next three decades he produced a total of nineteen published papers on various aspects of geology and the physical geography of New South Wales. In his later papers he turned to geomorphology and palaeozoic stratigraphy.

He was awarded the Clarke Medal by the Royal Society of New South Wales (of which he was president in 1922) in 1939. Two years later, he became its 1941 Clarke memorial lecturer.

Awards
Preceded by Henry Caselli Richards	Clarke Medal; 1939	Succeeded by Frederic Wood Jones
