= Joan Crockford-Beattie =

Australian geologist and palaeontologist

Joan Marion Crockford-Beattie (January 1919 – 2015) was an Australian geologist and palaeontologist who specialised in bryozoan faunas of the Permian.

== Early life ==
Joan Marion Crockford was born in January 1919 at Hunters Hill, New South Wales. She attended Quambaar School in Bellevue Hill and enrolled in the University of Sydney in 1937, where she studied geology. She graduated with a B.Sc. in 1939, and took honours and a University Medal in 1940.

== Career ==
Crockford earned a Science Research Scholarship in 1940, and worked as a demonstrator in 1941. She graduated with her M.Sc. in 1942, and continued her research under a Linnean Society of New South Wales Macleay Fellowship for a further three years. Due to staff shortages during World War II, Crockford continued to teach during her fellowship. Wartime restrictions also affected research, with makeshift motors being devised in the Physics department to run the slide-making tools, and materials having to be mailed to her from colleagues in Queensland (Dorothy Hill), Tasmania and Western Australia (Curt Teichert), rather than conducted on site.

Crockford married George Beattie in 1945 and moved to Cobar in 1946. She continued working on her D.Sc., completing papers on Bryozoa with the help of specimens and thin sections she took with her and from staff at the Australian Museum. She graduated in 1951, and was now the mother of a three-year-old. Crockford-Beattie obtained work through Dr Norman Fisher with the Bureau of Mineral Resources in Canberra, describing photographs and slides of Bryozoans in their collection obtained from the Kimberley region. This work was completed by 1956 and was published in 1957. In total, she published over 16 papers. The family moved to a number of locations due to George Beattie's work as a mining engineer including Cracow, Queensland and Radium Hill. Joan Crockford-Beattie mentored Robin Wass, who would pursue Bryozoa as well as June Phillips-Ross.

== Personal life ==
Joan Crockford-Beattie and her husband had four children. She died in 2015.

=== Legacy ===
During her career, Crockford-Beattie recorded 79 species, 42 of which were new identifications. She named three new genera and the family Cyclostomata. She erected two families and seven genera—Pesnastylus, Minilya, Streblocladia, Stenodiscus, Etherella, Evactinostella and Liguloclema—as well as an estimated 100 other species of Bryozoa. One was named for her, namely Fenestella crockfordae Campbell.
