= Royal Society of Queensland =

- Predecessor: Queensland Philosophical Society
- Formation: 1884
- Purpose: 'Progressing science in Queensland'
- Headquarters: Brisbane, Queensland, Australia
- Members: Individuals
- President: Dr Nelson Quinn
- Website: Official website

The Royal Society of Queensland was formed in Queensland, Australia in 1884 from the Queensland Philosophical Society, Queensland's oldest scientific institution, with royal patronage granted in 1885.

The aim of the Society is "Progressing science in Queensland". "Science" is interpreted broadly and includes a wide range of learned disciplines that follow scientific method. The Society is a non-partisan, secular, learned society, not an activist lobby group and does not campaign on environmental or planning issues. The Society supports science and scientific endeavour through publication of scientific research, public seminars and other events and maintenance of a substantial scientific library.

The Society is a custodian of scientific tradition and aims to counter the ill-effects of over-specialisation in the academy and shallowness in public debate. Networking between scientists, government, business and the community is a primary activity.

Membership is open to any person interested in the progress of science in Queensland. Although the membership includes a number of eminent and widely respected scientists and public intellectuals, the Society is neither elitist nor exclusive.

The Society hosts a Research Fund, established to sponsor research projects that escape the attention of the mainstream grant programs (such as those of the Australian Research Council). Donations are tax deductible under Australian taxation law.

In 2018 the Society established the Queensland Science Network as an unincorporated collaboration between more than 20 Queensland-focused community-based scientific and naturalists' organisations.

In 2019, the Society, along with co-organisers AgForce (peak body for broadacre agriculture) and NRM Regions Queensland (peak body for the regional natural resource management groups), organised a two-day Dialogue to examine how to transition the broadacre pastoral country (two-thirds of Queensland's area) to sustainability. The Dialogue produced a consensus Rangelands Declaration and a shared commitment to engage in further regional consultations and policy analysis.

The records of the Society, including the digitised Minute Books, are held by the State Library of Queensland.

== Presidents ==
1883–84	Augustus Charles Gregory	Explorer, Surveyor, 1st Surveyor-General of Queensland
1884–85	Joseph Bancroft	Surgeon, Parasitologist
1885–86	Lewis Adolphus Bernays	public servant
1886–87	Albert Norton	Politician, Pastoralist
1887–88	Augustus Charles Gregory	Explorer, Surveyor
1888–89	Charles Walter De Vis	Biologist
1889–90	William Saville-Kent	Marine Biologist
1890–91	Frederick Manson Bailey	Botanist
1891	William Henry Miskin	Lawyer, lepidopterist
1891–92	Albert Norton	Politician, Pastoralist
1892–93	John Shirley	Educationist and scientist
1894	Robert Logan Jack	Geologist
1895	Walter Taylor	Construction
1896	Joseph Lauterer	Biologist, Doctor, Ethnographer
1897	Charles Joseph Pound	Microscopist, Bacteriologist
1898	Sydney Barber Josiah Skertchly	Geologist, Naturalist
1899	Joseph William Sutton	Engineer, Inventor
1900	John Thomson	Army surgeon and colonel
1901	William James Byram	Lawyer, Poet
1902	John Thomson	unknown
1903	Wilton Wood Russell Love	Medicine, Surgeon, Medical technologist
1904	John Cameron	unknown
1905	John Brownlie Henderson	Analyst, Food Standards, Public Servant
1906	unknown	unknown
1907	Alfred Jefferis Turner	Paediatrician, Entomologist
1908	Johannes Christian Brunnich	Chemist
1909	John Frederick Bailey	Botanist
1910	William Robert Colledge	Chemist
1911	John Brownlie Henderson	Analyst, Food Standards, Public Servant
1912	Percy Leonard Weston	Engineer
1913	Henry Caselli Richards	Geologist
1914	John Shirley	unknown
1915	Thomas Harvey Johnston	Biologist, Parasitologist
1916	Ronald Hamlyn-Harris	Entomologist
1917	Elliott Henry Gurney	Agricultural Science, Public Servant
1918	Arthur Bache Walkom	Palaeobotanist, Museum director
1919	Albert Heber Longman	Naturalist, Museum Curator
1920	F.B. Smith	unknown
1921	Cyril Tenison White	Botanist
1922	Henry James Priestley	Mathematician
1923	unknown	unknown
1924	E. O. Marks	Geologist, Ophthalmologist
1924–25	Walter Heywood Bryan	Geologist
1925–26	Roger Hawken	Engineer
1926–27	James Vincent Duhig	Pathologist, Bacteriologist
1927–28	E. J. Goddard	Biologist, Zoologist
1928–1929	Thomas Parnell (scientist)	Physicist
1929–30	J. P. Lowson	Medical Psychologist
1930–31	J.B. Henderson	unknown
1931–32	Desmond A. Herbert	Botanist
1932–33	Thomas Gilbert Henry Jones	Chemist
1933–34	Raphael Cilento	Medicine
1934–35	John S. Just	Engineer
1935–36	Robert Veitch	unknown
1936–37	Jack Keith Murray	Agricultural science
1937–38	L.S. Bagster	Biochemistry
1938–39	Henry Caselli Richards	Geologist
1939–40	Albert Heber Longman - also recorded "H.A. Longman"	Naturalist, Museum Curator
1940–41	Frederick William Whitehouse	Geologist
1941	Herbert Robert Seddon	Veterinarian
1942	D.K.H. Lee	Medicine
1943	John Bostock	Medical doctor
1944	F. Athol Perkins	Entomologist
1945	Herbert John Wilkinson	Anatomist
1946	Owen Arthur Jones	Geologist
1947	E.M. Shephard	unknown
1948	Hugh C. Webster	Physicist
1949	Dorothy Hill	Geologist, Palaeontologist
1950	M.F. Hickey	Medicine
1951	Herbert John Hines	Biochemist
1952	Ian Murray MacKerras	Zoologist
1953	Stanley Thatcher Blake	Botanist
1954	Mansergh Shaw	Engineer
1955	A.L. Reimann	Physicist
1956	Alfred Roy Brimblecombe	Entomologist, Public Servant
1957	George Mack	Ornithologist
1958	Elizabeth Nesta Marks	Entomologist
1959	T.K. Ewer	Animal Health
1960	Alan Knox Denmead	Geologist
1961	Selwyn Everist	unknown
1962	John O'Hagan	Biochemist
1963	Jack Tunstall Woods	Geologist
1964	Otto Egede Budtz-Olsen	Physiologist
1965	Clive Selwyn Davis	Mathematician
1966	John Edward Coaldrake	Geologist, Ecologist
1967	Richard Harold Greenwood	Geography
1968	E.J. Britten	Professor
1969	J. Francis	Professor
1970	Alan Bartholomai	Geologist, Palaeontologist, Museum Curator
1971	Jim M. Thomson	Marine scientist
1972	Leendert ‘t Mannetje	Botanist
1973	Graham William Saunders	Entomologist, Conservationist, Public Servant
1974	H.M.D. Hoyte	Parasitologist
1975	G. Molyneux	Professor
1976	Michael MacLaren Bryden	Veterinarian
1977	Hugh John Lavery	Ecologist
1978–79	Calvin Wyatt Rose	Environmental physicist, Soil science
1979–80	Bruce J. Rigsby	Anthropologist
1980–81	R.G. Everson	unknown
1981–82	Robert 'Bob' W. Johnson	Botanist
1982–83	A. Bailey	Biologist, phycologist
1983–84	Neville Cecil Stevens	Geologist
1984–85	R.J. Coleman	unknown
1985–86	Paul S. Sattler	Ecologist, Public Servant
1986–87	A.W. Coulter	unknown
1988	Peter Alexander Jell	Geologist
1989	Ross A. Hynes	Ecologist, Public Servant
1990	M.G. Le Grand	unknown
1991	M.G. Le Grand	unknown
1992	E.D. McKenzie	unknown
1993	C.G. Smith	Chemistry
1994	Robert 'Bob' W. Johnson	Botanist
1995	Jeanette Adelaide Covacevich	Herpetologist, Museum Curator
1995–97	John Jell	Geologist
1998–99	David Doley	Botanist
2000–01	Julia Playford	Geneticist
2002	Peter Greshoff / Julia Playford	Geneticists
2003	Julia Playford	Geneticist
2004–12	Craig Walton	Public Servant
2013–19	Geoffrey Edwards	Ecologist, Policy Analyst
2020–22	Ross Hynes	Ecologist
2022–	Nelson Quinn	Legal scholar

== See also ==
- Proceedings of the Royal Society of Queensland
