= Haddon King =

Australian geologist

Donald Melrose
- Born: 1905
- Died: 1990 (aged 84–85)
- Education: University of Toronto
- Awards: Clarke Medal; W. R. Browne Medal; Penrose Gold Medal; Australasian Institute of Mining and Metallurgy medal
- Scientific career
- Fields: Geology
- Workplaces: Western Mining Corporation; Consolidated Zinc

Haddon Rymer Forrester King (4 February 1905 – 1990), was an Australian geologist, winner of the Clarke Medal in 1972.

King was born in Georgetown, British Guiana, son of George Forrester King and his wife Jessie Ann, née Kingsland. In 1926 he started as a surveyor’s assistant on the Geological Survey of British Guiana under the supervision of H. J. C. (Terence) Conolly. King obtained his surveyor’s licence in 1929 and then moved to Canada where he studied mining engineering at the University of Toronto (B.A.Sc., 1934). King gained experience in mineral exploration working with Conolly in the Timmins and Sudbury Basin regions.

King was invited to join the newly formed Western Mining Corporation in Western Australia in 1934 `to apply the latest ideas in geology, geophysics, geochemistry and aerial photography to the scientific search for new mineral deposits’, collaborating with U.S. consultants. King became senior geologist in 1936. In 1953, King became chief geologist of Consolidated Zinc.

King’s most significant contribution to mining geology came from his recognition that the Broken Hill ore body (along with other similar deposits worldwide) originated as sedimentary layers of metals, rather than later replacements from metallic solutions.

King won the W. R. Browne Medal of the Australian Geographic Society in 1984.

Awards
| Preceded by Nancy Tyson Burbidge | Clarke Medal; 1972 | Succeeded by Marshall Hatch |
