= William Rowan Browne =

Australian geologist

William Rowan Browne FAA (11 December 1884 – 1 September 1975) was an Australian geologist, author of The Geology of the Commonwealth of Australia.

== Early life ==
Browne was born in Lislea, County Londonderry, Ireland; both parents were school teachers. He was educated at Coleraine Academical Institution and entered Trinity College, Dublin in 1903, but soon had to withdraw due to tuberculosis. On advice he took a long sea voyage and travelled to Australia in 1904.

== Career ==
Browne tutored before enrolling at the University of Sydney. He earned a D.Sc. with university medal in 1922 for his work in igneous and metamorphic petrology. In 1923 he was promoted to assistant professor.

Browne completed The Geology of the Commonwealth of Australia, started by Professor Edgeworth David. David informed Browne of this in March 1934; David died 28 August 1934. The New South Wales government commissioned Browne to publish the work. David's manuscript was only a bundle of rough notes; some chapters were practically empty. Geology was finally printed in 1950.

The Sydney Metropolitan Water, Sewerage and Drainage Board invited Browne to investigate a site for a storage reservoir on the Warragamba River. Browne found a better site and continued as geological adviser until 1960 when the Warragamba Dam was completed.

== Personal life ==
He was married to Olga Marian Pauss (born 1891), a daughter of the Norwegian consul Olav Eduard Pauss. They had two daughters. Olga died in 1948. In 1950 he married Dr Ida Alison Brown, a colleague and geologist who was required to resign her position as senior lecturer upon marriage. Browne died in 1975, having nursed his wife through a debilitating illness for five years. She survived him by a few months.

== Honours and legacy ==
Browne was awarded the Clarke Medal by the Royal Society of New South Wales (of which he was president 1932–33) in 1942. Browne was a founder of the Geographical Society of New South Wales in 1927, president 1929–30 and 1948–49. He was also a founder, in 1952, of the Geological Society of Australia, of which he was president 1955–56. The society awards the W. R. Browne Medal as its highest honour.

In 1959 he was awarded the Mueller Medal by the Australian and New Zealand Association for the Advancement of Science.

Awards
Preceded by Frederic Wood Jones	Clarke Medal; 1942	Succeeded by Walter Lawry Waterhouse
