= Henry Caselli Richards =

Australian professor of geology, academic and teacher

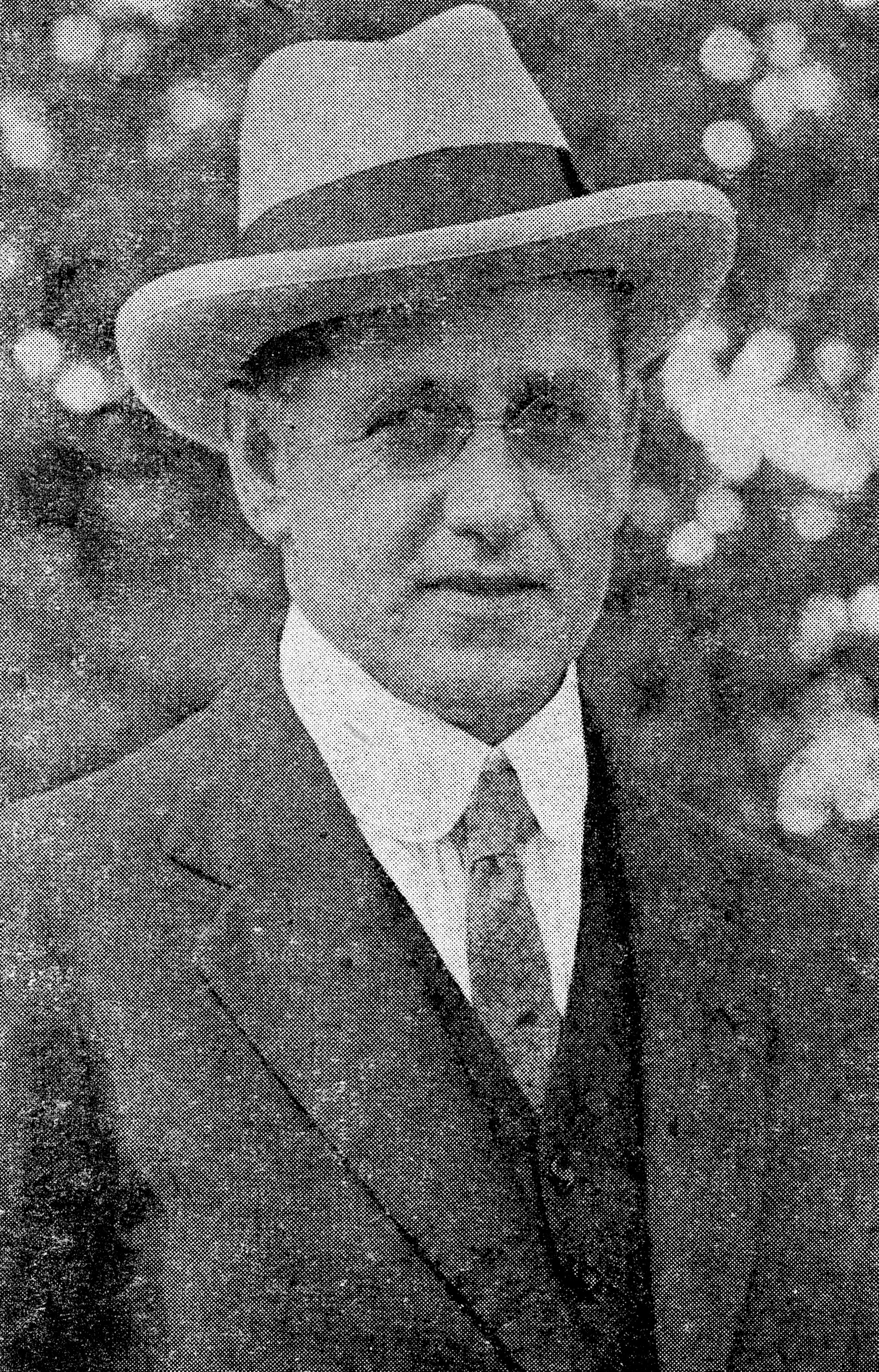
- Born: 16 December 1884; Melton, Australia
- Died: 13 June 1947 (aged 62)
- Education: Box Hill Grammar, South Melbourne College
- Alma mater: University of Melbourne
- Awards: Clarke Medal
- Scientific career
- Fields: geologist

Henry Caselli (H. C.) Richards (16 December 1884 – 13 June 1947), was an Australian professor of geology, academic and teacher.

== Education ==
Richards was born in Melton, Victoria and was educated at Box Hill Grammar, South Melbourne College and the University of Melbourne, obtaining a B.Sc. in 1906, M.Sc. in 1909 and D.Sc. in 1915.

== Career ==
Richards worked on the geological survey of Victoria in 1906–07 while still an undergraduate student. He went to work for De Bavay and Company in Broken Hill, and then took up a position as a scholar and demonstrator at the University of Melbourne. In 1910, Richards took up a position teaching in the Chemistry, Geology and Mining Department of the Central Technical College (CTC), in the Government House Domain of George Street, Brisbane (forerunner of Queensland Institute of Technology). He successfully applied to be a lecturer at the newly formed University of Queensland in 1911. Both the CTC and University of Queensland geology classes would share some of the same buildings in George Street, Brisbane, until the university moved to the St Lucia campus in 1950.

Richards was interested in the building stones of both Victoria, and later his adopted home of Queensland. He published two papers on the building stones of Brisbane, especially Helidon sandstone and was an advisor on the plans for the building work of the University of Queensland in 1930 to 1931 and again in 1938, among other projects.

Richards would be a dynamic force for the Geology Department, the Faculty of Science and the university during its early years. In 1919, Richards became the university's first geology professor. He was dean of the Faculty of Science, president of the Board of Faculties, president of the Staff Association, on the University Senate, chairman of Public Exams Committee, Music Advisory Board and many others. In 1946, Richards was professor of geology, deputy chancellor of the university, chairman of trustees of the National Art Gallery, president of the Art Galleries and Museums Association of Australia and New Zealand, chairman of the Great Barrier Reef Committee and many others. He led geology camps to Spicer's Gap and the Great Barrier Reef. His wife would be a chaperone for the female students, on many camps and dances held at the fledgling university. Dorothy Hill would become one of the students of the geology department in 1925, and found him to be a great mentor of the science students. He encouraged her to apply for a Foundation Travelling Scholarship to the University of Cambridge in 1929, which she won.

Richards also began the purchase of research materials to build a library at the university.

In 1922 he founded, along with Queensland governor Sir Matthew Nathan, the Great Barrier Reef Committee. This led to two deep boring projects through the reef (in 1927 and 1937) to prove one of Charles Darwin's theories and to look for ways to exploit the economic potential of the reef. The committee's public relations ventures, in order to bring in more money for their research programmes, would also lead to a number of biological expeditions to the Reef, including the year-long Low Isles Great Barrier Reef Expedition of 1928. This expedition brought in many biologists and geographers from around the world, and led to publication of research at the British Natural History Museum. The committee's work would eventually lead to the establishment of the Heron Island Research Station, Australia's first coral reef marine biology research station.

In 1929, Richards took leave from the university and was a member of the Royal Commission into Mining in Queensland. This enabled him to travel to the International Geology Conference in South Africa, as a representative of the Australian and Queensland governments. Being equally interested in art as he was in geology, Richards was a member of the Survey of Australian and New Zealand Museums and Art Galleries for the Carnegie Corporation of New York in 1932–33, and received a Carnegie Institute medal for his services to this survey in 1936. This enabled him to take an extended trip overseas to visit the Carnegie Institute in Washington, D.C., and the Seismology Laboratory in Pasadena, California (Caltech). This visit led to a Commonwealth Council for Scientific and Industrial Research (CSIR) grant to obtain a second Milne-Shaw seismograph for the university, following the 1935 earthquake in Gayndah, Queensland. The university established their first Seismology station in 1937, thanks to the work of Richards and his colleague W.H. Bryan. Richards would be appointed to the board of trustees of the Queensland Art Gallery in 1938, and became president of the same in 1945 until his death in 1947.

Richards worked for the Queensland Department of Mines and was a member of Artesian Water Committee, in 1938, as well as being the president of the Royal Society of Queensland. He was awarded the Clarke Medal of the Royal Society of New South Wales in 1938, the fourth Queensland recipient to be so awarded.

During World War Two, Richards assisted the war effort by helping to place scientists in appropriate positions in either the armed or civilian services. In 1941, he and Dorothy Hill worked on the project to analyse two bores of the Great Barrier Reef.

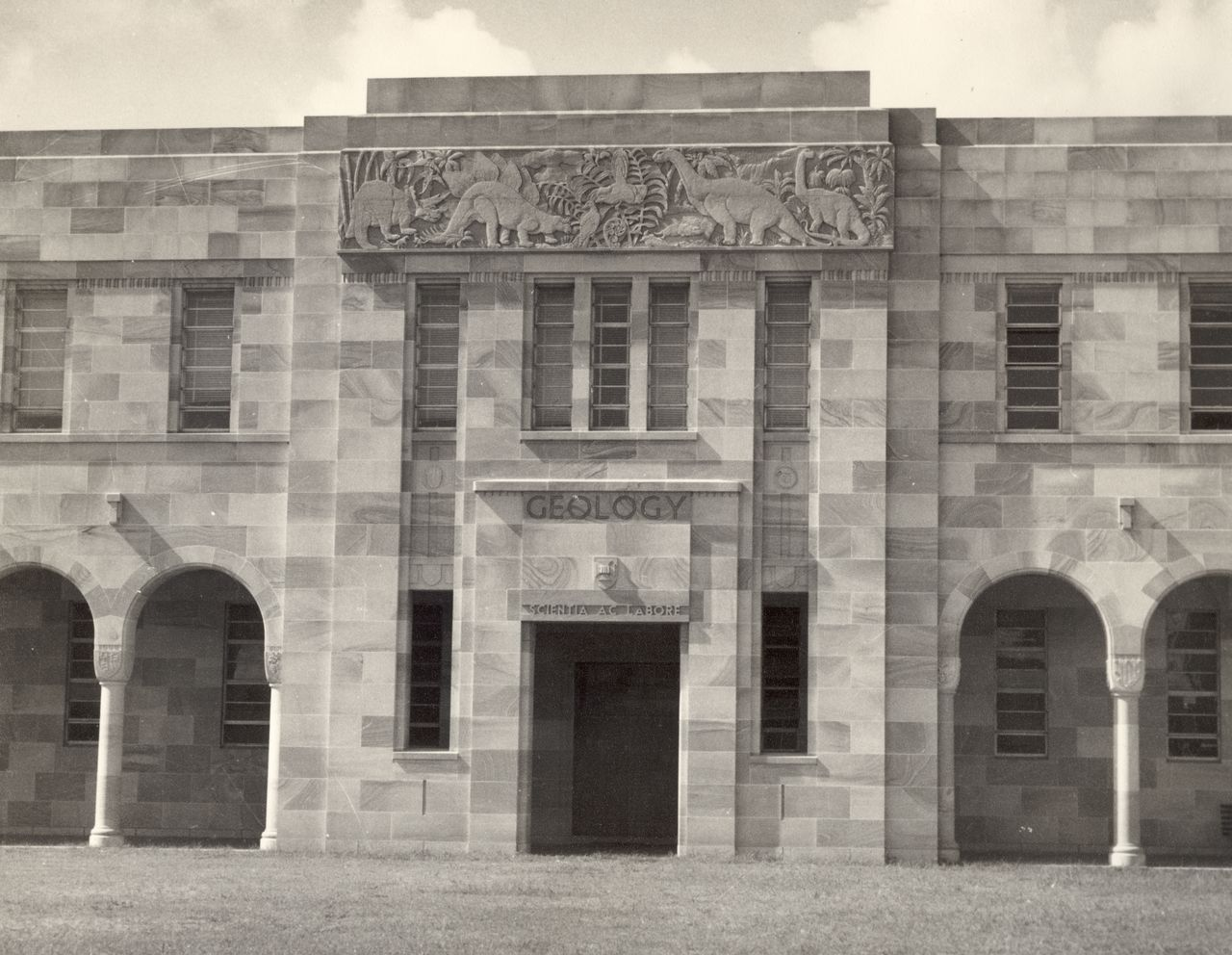
University of Queensland, Richards Building (geology) named for H. C. Richards. It depicts a frieze designed by the Geology staff. Photo used with the permission of the University of Queensland Fryer Library

Richards died in 1947 in Brisbane, survived by his wife Grace and two children. He was celebrated for his energy and industriousness, popularity with students and ability to foster cooperation between the university and the Queensland government.

== Legacy ==
Following his death, the new Geology Department building, which he had toiled over to establish at the new campus of St Lucia, was named in his honour. It fronts the Great Court. W.H. Bryan would succeed him in the position of professor. The H. C. Richards Memorial Prize was established in geology, in acknowledgement of his contribution to the University of Queensland. It was an annual prize in art from 1954–1972. A bas-relief was sculpted of him in the entrance stones of the geology building, and an ammonite fossil, carved into the entrance to the building, was similarly named for him.

Richards Street, in the ACT suburb of Hackett, is named in his honour.

== Published works ==
Richards, H. C. (1916). The volcanic rocks of south-eastern Queensland. Proceedings of the Royal Society of Queensland, 27: 105–124.

Richards, H. C. (1918). The building stones of Queensland. Proceedings of the Royal Society of Queensland, 30: 97–157.

Richards, H. C. (1918). The volcanic rocks of Springsure, Central Queensland. Proceedings of the Royal Society of Queensland, 30: 179–198.

Richards, H. C. (1920). Notes on the vent structures and jointing of the municipal quarry, Toowooomba, Queensland. Queensland naturalist, 2: 94–96.

Richards, H. C. (1922). Anorthoclase Basalt from Mapleton, Blackall Range, south-eastern Queensland. Proceedings of the Royal Society of Queensland, 34: 161–167.

Richards, H. C. and Bryan, W. H. (1924). The geology of the Silverwood-Lucky Valley area. Proceedings of the Royal Society of Queensland, 36: 44–108.

Richards, H. C. and Bryan, W. H. (1926). Note on the Devonian rocks of central and southern Queensland. Reports of the Australian Australasian Association for the Advancement of Science, 18: 286–290.

Richards, H. C. and Bryan, W. H. (1927). Volcanic mud balls from the Brisbane Tuff. Proceedings of the Royal Society of Queensland, 39: 54–60.

Richards, H. C. and Bryan, W. H. (1932). Algal Limestones from Gigoomgan, Queensland. Geological magazine, 69: 289–301.

Richards, H. C. and Bryan, W. H. (1934). The problem of the Brisbane Tuff. Proceedings of the Royal Society of Queensland, 45: 50–62.

Richards, H. C. and Hill, D. (1942). Great Barrier Reef bores, 1926 and 1937-descriptions, analyses, interpretations. Report of the Great Barrier Reef Committee, 5: 1–111.

== Bibliography ==
- Dorothy Hill, 'Richards, Henry Caselli (1884–1947)', Australian Dictionary of Biography, Volume 11, MUP, 1988, pp 373–374.

Awards
Preceded by John Thomas Jutson	Clarke Medal; 1938	Succeeded by Carl Süssmilch
