= Sustainable Minerals Institute =

Research institute in Queensland, Australia

- Formation: 2001
- Founder: Don McKee
- Headquarters: Level 4, Sir James Foots Building (No. 47A) The University of Queensland, St Lucia, Queensland 4067
- Location: Brisbane, Australia
- Coordinates: 27.50055°S 153.01417°E

The Sustainable Minerals Institute (SMI) at the University of Queensland (UQ) is a research institute focused on understanding and implementing the principles of sustainable development through engagement with industry contacts from geology to mining, processing and disposal. In 2022, the institute was awarded more than $1.2 million in grants to develop research into sustainable resources for the mining industry.

The founder, of one of the original centres that forms part of SMI (Julius Kruttschnitt Mineral Research Centre), Alban Lynch, died in 2021. Don McKee was SMI's inaugural director.

== Organisational structure ==
The Sustainable Minerals Institute is made up of 7 research centres, an international centre (SMI Chile) and a technology transfer company (JKTech).

=== Research centres ===
- Centre for Environmental Responsibility in Mining (CERM)
- Centre for Social Responsibility in Mining (CSRM)
- Global Centre for Mineral Security (GCMS)
- Julius Kruttschnitt Mineral Research Centre (JKMRC)
- Leading for High Reliability Centre (LHRC)
- Minerals Industry Safety and Health Centre (MISHC)
- WH Bryan Mining and Geology Research Centre (BRC)

=== International centre ===
- Sustainable Minerals Institute Chile (SMI Chile)

=== Technology transfer ===
- JKTech

== Leadership and governance ==
Since September 2022, the Sustainable Minerals Institute has been led by Professor Rick Valenta as Director. The institute operates within the governance framework of the University of Queensland.

== Notable people ==
- Bob Bryan, board member and son of WH Bryan.
- Saleem Ali (academic) – Director of CSRM, 2012–2015.
- David Brereton – Director of CSRM, 2001–2012.
- Martha Macintyre – Australian anthropologist, Honorary Professor.
