= Alcheringa (journal) =

- Discipline: Palaeontology
- Language: English
- Edited by: Benjamin Kear

Publication details
- History: 1975-present
- Publisher: Taylor & Francis
- Frequency: Quarterly
- Impact factor: 1.2 (2023)

Standard abbreviations
- ISO 4: Alcheringa

Indexing
- ISSN: 0311-5518 (print); 1752-0754 (web)
- LCCN: 2007247629
- OCLC no.: 321020127

Links
- Journal homepage; Online access; Online archive

Alcheringa: An Australasian Journal of Palaeontology is a quarterly peer-reviewed scientific journal covering all aspects of palaeontology and its ramifications into the Earth and biological sciences, especially the disciplines of taxonomy, biostratigraphy, micropalaeontology, vertebrate palaeontology, palaeobotany, palynology, palaeobiology, palaeoanatomy, palaeoecology, biostratinomy, biogeography, chronobiology, biogeochemistry and palichnology. It is the official journal of the Association of Australasian Palaeontologists and is published by Taylor & Francis.

The journal was established in 1975. The name "Alcheringa" is derived from the Arrernte language of the Arrernte Aboriginal people of the Alice Springs area of central Australia, Northern Territory. "Alcheringa" (also spelled altjeringa) is the popularised English version of an Arrernte expression that means "in the beginning" or "from all eternity". Alcheringa is also the name given to a 2.7-2.8 billion-year-old stromatolite from the Pilbara region of Western Australia and symbolises the antiquity of life and its record in sedimentary rocks. An image of the stromatolite is illustrated on the cover of the journal.
