= W. R. Browne Medal =

The W. R. Browne Medal is awarded by the Geological Society of Australia "to a person distinguished for contributions to the geological sciences in Australia." The medal is named after William Rowan Browne.

== Recipients ==
- 1979: Edwin Sherbon Hills
- 1981: Dorothy Hill
- 1981: Norman Henry Fisher
- 1984: Haddon King
- 1986: Germaine Joplin
- 1988: Basil Balme
- 1992: David Brown
- 1994: Allan White
- 1996: John R. De Laeter
- 1998: Cecil George Murray
- 2000: Alfons VandenBerg
- 2002: Brenda Franklin
- 2004: Ian Withnall
- 2006: Ken Campbell
- 2008: Jim Ross
- 2010: Anthony Cockbain
- 2012: John Foden
- 2014: Gavin Young
- 2016: Bryan Smith
- 2018: Neville Exon
- 2021: Peter Betts
- 2023: Anita Andrew
- 2026: Wolfgang Preiss
