= John Thomas Jutson =

Australian geologist and lawyer

John Thomas Jutson (1874 – 14 November 1959) was an Australian geologist and lawyer.

Jutson was born in Melbourne and while working as a clerk in a law firm, studied geology part-time. He became geological research scholar, University of Melbourne 1909-10 and then worked for the Geological Survey of Western Australia 1911–18. He published The Physiography of Western Australia in 1916.

Jutson was awarded the Clarke Medal by the Royal Society of New South Wales in 1937.

Awards
Preceded by Douglas Mawson	Clarke Medal; 1937	Succeeded by Henry Caselli Richards
