= Germaine Joplin =

Australian geologist

Germaine Joplin AM
- Born: 26 February 1903; Strathfield, New South Wales, Australia
- Died: 18 July 1989 (aged 86); Sydney, New South Wales, Australia
- Education: University of Sydney, University of Cambridge
- Awards: Clarke Medal, Browne Medal, Order of Australia
- Scientific career
- Fields: Geologist

Germaine Anne Joplin AM (26 February 1903 – 18 July 1989) was an Australian geologist and winner of the Clarke Medal in 1963.

== Early life ==
Joplin, born in Strathfield, New South Wales in 1903, was educated at Presbyterian Ladies' College in Croydon, Sydney. She initially trained as a nurse on leaving school, but at age 23 commenced studies at the University of Sydney, graduating with a B.Sc. and First Class Honours, the University Medal in Geology, the Science Research Scholarship, the Deas-Thomson Scholarship for Mineralogy and Professor Cotton's Prize in 1930. Joplin then pursued study in England, earning a Junior Fellowship of the World Federation of University Women to study petrology at Newnham College, University of Cambridge with Cecil Edgar Tilley. A number of Australian women were studying with her at Newnham College during the 1930s, including Dorothy Hill and Betty Ripper. Joplin attained her Ph.D. in 1936.

== Career ==
After returning from England, Joplin took up an assistant lectureship in petrology at the University of Sydney. She resigned from this position in 1941 when she received a full time Linnean Macleay Research Fellowship to research the geology of the Cooma district. In 1945 she returned to lecturing on igneous and metamorphic petrology, publishing studies of granites at Hartley, the skarns at Ben Bullen and metamorphic rocks around Albury. She took a D.Sc. from the University of Sydney in 1950 for her thesis 'On the question of interaction between primary granitic and primary basaltic magma under varying tectonic conditions'. Simultaneous to her teaching and research, Joplin was taking night classes to earn a B.A and a Diploma in Social Studies from the University of Sydney in 1950. After graduation, she left geology and the university for a time to join the NSW Society of Crippled Children as a social worker.

In 1951 Joplin moved to Canberra and worked for the Bureau of Mineral Resources for a year, before commencing a permanent research position as a Fellow in the recently established Department of Geophysics at the Australian National University. Joplin was the first academic appointed by J. C. Jaegar who had been tasked with setting up the Department of Geophysics. This was her first permanent position, and the beginning of a long career at the Australian National University. She was appointed to Fellow of the governing body of University House, a residential college, in 1953, and served on the University Council between 1969 and 1975. Joplin also served as Divisional chair of the Canberra branch of the Geological Society of Australia in 1955, ran the Standing Committee on Collection and Recording of Chemical Analyses of Australian Rocks from 1964 to 1969, and was a foundation member of the Geological Society of Australia Specialist Group in Geochemistry, Mineralogy and Petrology.

Joplin's principal works were three critical compilations of analytical data on Australian rocks, commenced during her short time with the Bureau of Mineral Resources and published in their Bulletin series, plus two petrology monographs and a book for high school readers. A Petrology of Australian Igneous Rocks (1964; 2nd Ed. 1968; 3rd Ed. 1971) was also published in New York and later A Petrology of Australian Metamorphic Rocks (Sydney, 1968) was published. Finding the Age of Rocks (Sydney, 1972) was written in collaboration with John Richards and Christine Joplin.

== Awards ==
In 1963 Joplin was awarded the Clarke Medal by the Royal Society of New South Wales. In 1986 Joplin was awarded the W. R. Browne Medal by the Geological Society of Australia 'for distinguished contributions to the Geological Sciences of Australia'. Also in 1986, she became a Member of the General Division of the Order of Australia (AM) 'for service to science, particularly in the field of geology'.

Joplin died in Sydney in 1989.

After her death, the Australian National University honoured her by giving her name to both the library at University House and a street in the Kambri precinct.

Awards
Preceded by Horace Waring	Clarke Medal; 1963	Succeeded by Joyce Winifred Vickery
