= Johannes Christian Brunnich =

Johannes Christian Brünnich FRIC (11 September 1861 – 3 July 1933) was an Australian agricultural chemist.

== Biography ==
Brünnich was the son of Christian Christoph Brünnich, a Lutheran pastor and mathematician, and his wife Pauline Therese, née Kühnehe. He was born at Gorizia, then in Austria-Hungary, now Italy. Raised in Bohemia, he was educated in Switzerland after his family moved there in 1874. He travelled in Russia and for a period was chemist in a sugar-mill in Bohemia. While performing Swiss military service in 1884, he met Dr J. J. Mueller of Gayndah, Queensland, and decided to emigrate to Australia, arriving in Brisbane early in 1885.

In 1897, he was appointed government agricultural chemist in the new Queensland Department of Agriculture.

He was vice-president of the Royal Society of Queensland in 1907, president in 1908 and treasurer in 1909 to 1914.

He was a foundation member and fellow of the Royal Australian Chemical Institute and was elected a fellow of the Royal Institute of Chemistry of Great Britain in 1905. In 1908, he was president of the Royal Society of Queensland.
