= Elizabeth Ripper =

Australian geologist

Elizabeth Arnold Ripper (7 September 1909 – June 2004) was an Australian geologist, significant for her work in stromatoporoids.

Elizabeth or Betty, as she was generally referred to, was born in Melbourne. She attended Melbourne High School from 1925 to 1927. Ripper became interested in geology after attending classes in it at school in 1925. Her family were unable to dissuade her from pursuing it at university.

== Research ==
Ripper attended the University of Melbourne, taking a B.Sc. in geology from 1928 to 1931, winning the J.F.W. Payne exhibition in botany and Argus exhibition in geology in 1928. She was a Kernot and Wyselaskie Scholar in geology in 1932, while she undertook her M.Sc. While the Geology Department at the university was heavily influenced by the petrological studies of Ernest W. Skeats, Ripper was attracted to the palaeontological programs of Frederick A. Singleton. She attended geology field trips in company with a number of female students of the department, as well as Edwin Sherbon Hills. Ripper was first interested in Ordovician and Silurian graptolites, and would also write on Silurian (Lilydale Limestone) stromatoporoids for her Masters thesis. Frederick Chapman of the National Museum of Victoria was her mentor during this research. Her work impressed her supervisors, and Ripper was encouraged to go to Cambridge and study with Gertrude Elles at the Sedgwick Museum, University of Cambridge, who was an expert on graptolites in 1933. Ripper would win an Orient free passage and take with her materials she had collected around Victoria, as well as stromatoporoids from Lilydale and Buchan. Elles was nearing retirement in 1933, and her supervision of her new Australian student, was fairly minimal. Elles had also supervised another Australian student, Dorothy Hill who took her PhD at Cambridge in 1933 and remained at Cambridge for another four years as a Fellow. Hill and Ripper would work in close quarters at the Sedgwick Museum of Earth Sciences, Newnham College and out in the field, collecting specimens in Wales. Ripper's research deviated from graptolites, and instead focussed on the stromatoporoids she had brought from Australia. She was also able to use materials within the British Museum (Natural History) and the Sedgwick Museum with the support of mentors, W. D. Lang and H. Dighton Thomas. She was awarded her PhD in 1936. Ripper published her research in Australian journals.

== Later life ==
After returning to Australia following the completion of her PhD, Ripper went back to England to marry fellow geologist, Stanley C.A. Holmes who was attached to the Great Britain Geological Survey. The Great Depression had a significant effect on employment options for both men and women, and positions for women in geology were extremely rare. Ripper joined the Geological Society of London, but was unable to find work, and with the advent of World War II, and a family, her options for pursuing research and employment were low.

She continued to maintain an interest in stromatoporoid research and the affairs of the Geological Association until the 1990s.

Ripper died in Ewell, Surrey in June 2004.

== Legacy ==
Ripper's study of Victorian Lower Devonian stromatoporoids still holds today, and two were named for her- Pseudotrupetostroma ripperae from Jesse Limestone (New South Wales) and Hermatostromella holmesae from Lilydale Limestone (Victoria). Nearly all of the species and subspecies she named in her papers from 1933, 1937a and 1937c have held up to current study.

== Publications ==
- Ripper, E. A., 1932. The distribution of the Zones of the Castlemaine and Darriwil Series near Ingliston. Proceedings of the Royal Society of Victoria 44: 200–211, pi. xx + 1 text-fig.
- Ripper, E. A., 1933. The stromatoporoids of the Lilydale Limestone. Part I. Actinostroma and Clathrodictyon. Proceedings of the Royal Society of Victoria 45: 152–164, 6 text-figs.
- Rjpper, E. A., 1936. Some Victorian graptolite and stromatoporoid faunas. Dissertations of the University of Cambridge 1935–36, Abstract: 68–69.
- Rjpper, E. A., 1937a. A note on the occurrence of Didymograptus protobifidus Elies in the Lower Ordovician of Victoria. Proceedings of the Royal Society o f Victoria 49: 153–164, 9 figs.
- Rjpper, E. A., 1937b. The stromatoporoids of the Lilydale Limestone. Part II. Syringostroma, Stromatopora and other Genera. Proceedings of the Royal Society of Victoria 49: 178–205, 2 pis, 4 figs.
- Ripper, E. A., 1937c. On some stromatoporoids from Griffith's Quarry, Loyola, Victoria. Proceedings of the Royal Society of Victoria 50: 1-8 + 1 pi.
- Ripper, E. A., 1937d. On the stromatoporoids of the Buchan District, Victoria. Proceedings of the Royal Society of Victoria 50: 11–15, 4 pis.
- Ripper, E. A., 1937e. A note on the occurrence of Amphipora ramosa (Phillips) in Western Australia. Journal of the Royal Society of Western Australia 23: 37–41.
- Ripper, E. A., 1938. Notes of the Middle Palaeozoic stromatoporoid faunas of Victoria. Proceedings of the Royal Society of Victoria 50: 221–243, 4 figs.
