= Association of Australasian Palaeontologists =

Defunct group of the Geological Society of Australia

Australasian Palaeontologists was formerly known as The Association of Australasian Palaeontologists, which was a specialist group of the Geological Society of Australia for palaeontologists in Australia. In 2015 members elected to shorten the name from The Association of Australasian Palaeontologists to Australasian Palaeontologists.

== Publications ==
- Alcheringa - quarterly publication of the AAP (published through Taylor & Francis)
- Memoirs of the AAP - occasional publication covering large paleontological articles
- Nomen Nudum - newsletter of the AAP
