= Dorothy Hill =

Australian geologist and palaeontologist (1907–1997)

Dorothy Hill AC CBE FAA FRS
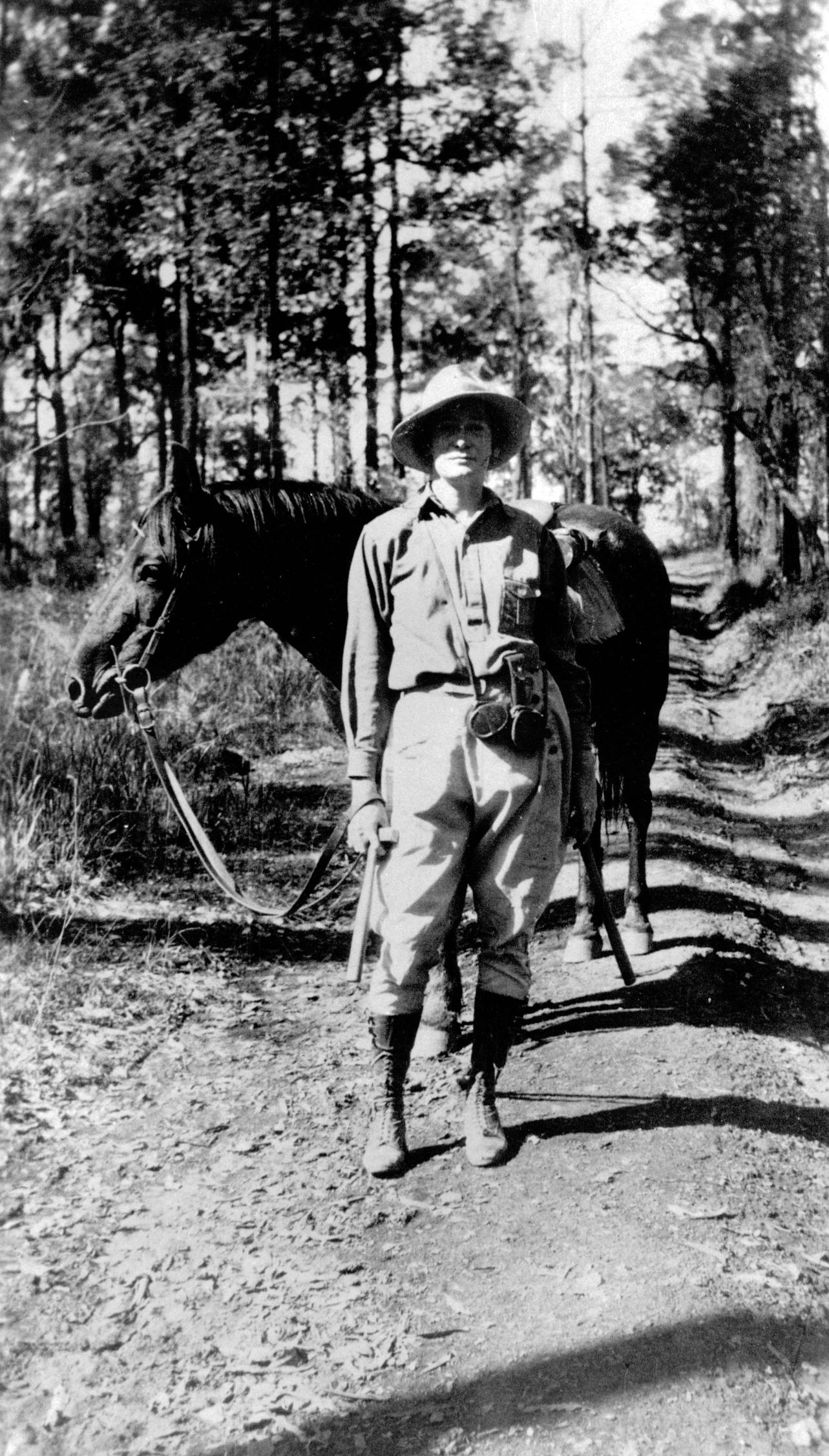
- Hill, with horse, Walter, c.1929
- Born: 10 September 1907; Brisbane, Queensland, Australia
- Died: 23 April 1997 (aged 89); Brisbane, Australia
- Education: Coorparoo State School, Brisbane Girls Grammar School, University of Queensland, Newnham College, Cambridge
- Awards: Lyell Medal (1964); Clarke Medal (1966); Mueller Medal (1967); CBE (1971); W. R. Browne Medal (1981); ANZAAS Medal (1983); AC (1993)
- Scientific career
- Fields: Geology, Palaeontology
- Workplaces: University of Queensland
- Doctoral advisor: Gertrude Elles
- Other academic advisors: Henry Caselli Richards

Dorothy Hill (10 September 1907 – 23 April 1997) AC CBE FAA FRS was an Australian geologist and palaeontologist, the first female professor at an Australian university, and the first female president of the Australian Academy of Science.

== Education ==
Dorothy Hill was born in Taringa, the third of 7 children, and grew up in Coorparoo in Brisbane. She attended Coorparoo State School, and then won a scholarship to attend Brisbane Girls Grammar School. She received the Lady Lilley Gold Medal, and the Phyllis Hobbs Memorial Prize in English and History, in 1924.

Hill was an enthusiastic sportswoman, who pursued athletics and netball at high school, and was an accomplished horsewoman at home. At the University of Queensland, she participated in hurdles, running, hockey and rowing. She played on the University of Queensland, Queensland state and Australian universities hockey teams. While at Cambridge University, she took a pilot's licence.

Following high school, she considered studying medicine and pursuing studies in medical research; however, at the time, the University of Queensland did not offer a medical degree, and the Hill family could not afford to send Dorothy to Sydney. Fortunately, she won one of twenty entrance scholarships to the University of Queensland in 1924 (after receiving the highest pass in the Senior Public Matriculation Exam), where she decided to study science, in particular chemistry. She chose to study geology as an elective, and under the guidance of Professor Henry Caselli Richards she graduated in 1928 with a First Class Honours degree in Geology and the university's Gold Medal for Outstanding Merit. Hill continued to work as a UQ Fellow through 1929–30 on scholarship while she was studying her Master of Science, conducting research in the Brisbane Valley on the stratigraphy of shales in Esk and sediments in the Ipswich basin. She began to collect fossils after she was introduced to them in the local limestone of a farm, where she was holidaying in Mundubbera. She was put forward for a UQ Foundation Travelling Scholarship by Professor Richards to study at the University of Cambridge's Sedgwick Museum, in residence at Newnham College, just as the Great Depression was taking effect.

At Cambridge, Hill was a Fellow of Newnham College and the Sedgwick Museum and was supported from 1931 to 1933 on an Old Students Research Fellowship while she worked on her PhD under supervisor, Gertrude Elles. Australian universities did not begin awarding PhDs until 1948 (with the first at UQ being awarded in 1950). Hill continued to explore the theory that Australia had once been covered from north to south by an inland sea, as evidenced by the fossil corals she found in Mundubbera. She received a further scholarship, Senior Student of the Exhibition of 1851 for two years and the Daniel Pidgeon Fund award from the Geological Society of London which enabled her to remain in England until 1936. A number of Australian students were at Newnham College with Hill in this era, including Elizabeth "Betty" Ripper, who was also studying palaeontology, and Germaine Joplin. She worked with Drs William Dickson Lang and Stanley Smith on Palaeozoic coral taxonomy, at the Natural History Museum in London. After Hill's return to Australia, she continued to study at the University of Queensland and took a Doctor of Science in 1942.

== Early career ==
Hill remained in England for seven years, publishing several important papers systematising the terminology for describing Rugose corals, and describing their structure and morphology. When Hill returned to Australia she took on the huge task of dating the limestone coral faunas of Australia, using them to outline wide-ranging stratigraphy, and producing papers on the coral faunas of all states except South Australia, some of these with Dr Walter Heywood Bryan. Her work on corals became the worldwide standard.

From 1937 to 1942, Hill was the recipient of a Council for Scientific and Industrial Research (CSIR) grant and worked as a research fellow at the University of Queensland. In 1939, Hill was involved with the Geological Survey of Queensland, consulted for the Shell Corporation and was secretary of the Royal Society of Queensland. Before the outbreak of World War II, she was leading geological field trips around Moreton Bay, and was studying the first core drills of the Great Barrier Reef with the Great Barrier Reef Committee. She won a Lyell Fund award in 1940, the first Queenslander and only the ninth Australian to do so, for her work on corals.

== World War II ==
During World War II, Hill enlisted in the Women's Royal Australian Naval Service, serving in the Naval Office in Brisbane, a division of HMAS Moreton. She worked 80–90 hours a week in between her coral research and in the cipher and coding of shipping orders in General Douglas MacArthur's division. She rose to the office of 2nd operations officer in the division, and also served on the demobilisation planning committee for women's services following the war.

== Later career ==
From 1946 to 1955, Hill served as the third secretary of the Great Barrier Reef Committee. She was instrumental in getting facilities at the Heron Island Research Station constructed. Her efforts included raising money, shipping in materials, and even building items for the facilities such as water tanks. Through campaigning, she was able to receive grants from the Rockefeller Foundation and the Australian Research Grants Committee. The money was used to improve the laboratory facilities and provide accommodation for visitors. She appointed Dr. W.G.H. Maxwell to a lecturing position in the department of geology, and he made several contributions to further benefit the Reef. Hill was appointed a full lecturer at UQ in 1946. In 1952, she was appointed senior lecturer before becoming chief lecturer in 1956, reader in geology in 1958, and research professor in 1959. She became a full professor in 1960.

During 1952, Professor John W. Wells of Cornell University visited the University of Queensland as a Fulbright Scholar. He was also a world authority on coelenterates. As a result of their meeting, Hill and Wells were able to work together on eight sections on coelenterates for the 1956 publication, Treatise on Invertebrate Paleontology, which continues to be updated today. Hill wrote a second volume for the treatise on Archaeocyatha in 1972.

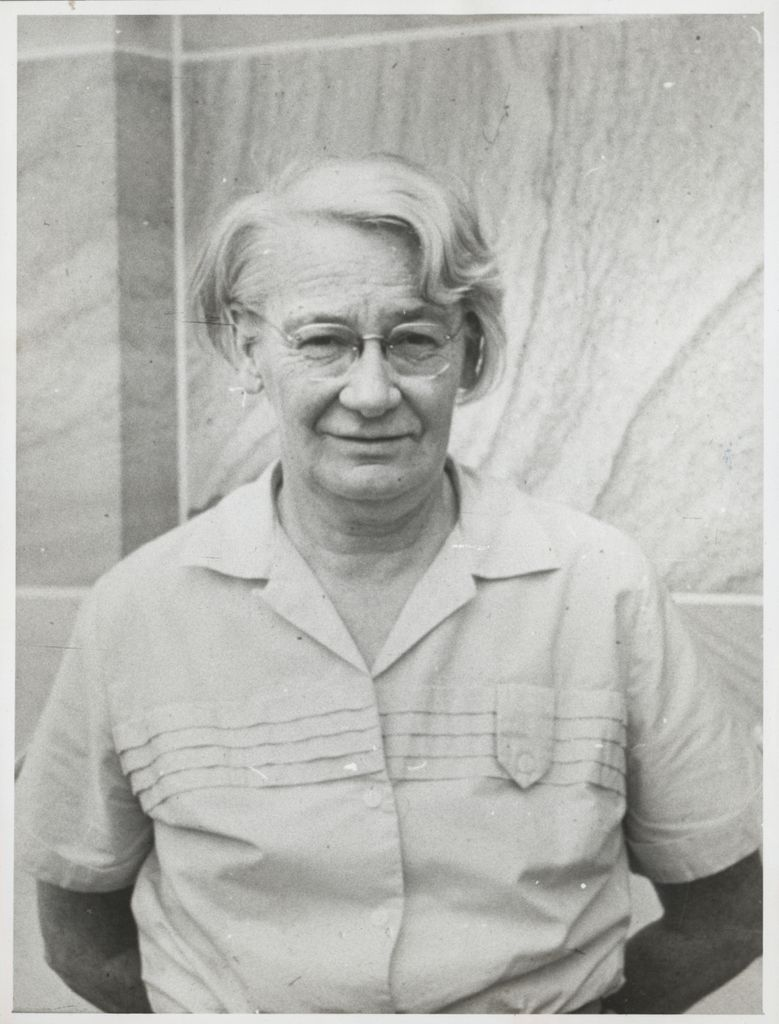
Dorothy Hill, of the University of Queensland (Photo used with the permission of the University of Queensland Fryer Library)

In 1947, Hill was president of the Royal Society of Queensland. In 1952, she was chairman of the Geological Society of Australia, Queensland Division. In 1956 Hill became the first female fellow of the Australian Academy of Science. From 1958 to 1964, she was editor of the Journal of the Geological Society of Australia. In 1964, Hill was awarded the Lyell Medal for scientific research and became the first Australian woman to be a Fellow of the Royal Society (of London). In 1968, she formed the Association of Australasian Palaeontologists. Hill served on the Australian Academy of Science committees, becoming vice-president in 1969 and the first female president in 1970, following the death of David Forbes Martyn. At the end of her term of office she did not seek re-election. She also made statements in the late 1960s and early 1970s, to promote female enrolments in science, discouraged by the slow growth in the area, and push toward a campaign aimed at parents.

In 1971, Hill became president of the Professorial Board of the University of Queensland, the first woman to be so recognised. In her interview with John Cole for his history of the university in 1980, she indicated-

"It seemed to me that having been considered incapable of administration when the Head of the Department (became available), knowing I would have made a success of it...here's a chance anyhow to prove that women can administer and research people can administer and in two capacities I could prove (myself)...I couldn't really see why a woman couldn't run a university."

She retired from the university in late 1972 to let younger academics have their turn in administration and to return to research, and the Dorothy Hill chair was established in her honour in Palaeontology and Stratigraphy. She continued to come into the university to pursue research, long after her official retirement, until about 1987. She was recognised with an Honorary Doctor of Laws from the university in 1974, in acknowledgement of her time on the Professorial Board.

Hill published over 100 research publications in Australian and international journals and books. In 1978, Hill completed the comprehensive Bibliography and Index of Australian Paleozoic Coral.

Hill had strong views on the value of a library to a university. Her experience of the profound benefit the University of Cambridge libraries gave its academics, and the poor state of the University of Queensland Library up until 1949, led to the development of the University of Queensland Geology Department's Library. The Geology Library was merged with the university's Physical Sciences and Engineering Library in 1997, which now bears her name. Eighty boxes of her papers were donated to the University of Queensland Fryer Library after her death. An online exhibition of her life and access to selected professional papers is accessible from the University of Queensland Library. Her considerable geological collection, of thousands of thin rock sections on glass slides, is housed in the University of Queensland's Geology Museum and in museums around the world. Her name was given to the Acanthastrea hillae, Australomya hillae, Filiconcha hillae, Reticulofenestra hillae, Striatopora? hillae, Yacutiopora hillae and Mesoplica? hillae.

Hill died in 1997.

== Awards ==
- 1932: Old Students' Research Fellowship of Newnham College, Cambridge
- 1934: Daniel Pidgeon Fund, Geological Society of London
- 1935: 1851 Research Fellowship, Senior Studentship, Newnham College, Cambridge
- 1940: Lyell Geological Fund award
- 1956: Fellow of the Australian Academy of Science (first female)
- 1965: Fellow of the Royal Society (of London) (with Lyell Medal) (first Australian female)
- 1966: Clarke Medal by the Royal Society of New South Wales
- 1967: Mueller Medal from the Australian and New Zealand Association for the Advancement of Science (ANZAAS)
- 1967: Bancroft Medal from the Australian Medical Association, Queensland branch
- 1967: Portrait commissioned. This portrait by Lola McCausland hangs in the Dorothy Hill Engineering and Sciences Library at UQ.
- 1970: President of the Australian Academy of Science (first female)
- 1971: CBE, for services to geology and palaeontology
- 1972: Queenslander of the Year (award from the National Party of Queensland)
- 1974: Honorary Doctorate of Laws for work in university administration, The University of Queensland
- 1977: Queen Elizabeth II Silver Jubilee Medal
- 1981: W.R. Browne Medal
- 1983: ANZAAS Medal
- 1993: A.C. (Companion of the Order of Australia) from the Australian government
- 2001: Victorian Honour Roll of Women

== Legacy ==
Hill made significant contributions to Australian earth science and was a pivotal role model in opening a whole new world of education to women. She mentored many students who went on to great success in the field of earth sciences, including Ken Campbell and Graham Maxwell. Malcolm Thomis in his history of the University of Queensland, described Hill as the "most outstanding graduate in the first 75 years of the University". The Great Court at the University of Queensland features a stone grotesque carved in her likeness by Rhyl Hinwood in 1982. There is also a bust of Hill, sculpted by Rhyl Hinwood at Brisbane Girls Grammar School. Coorparoo State School named a portion of their school for Hill in 2015.

In 1997 the University of Queensland's Physical Sciences and Engineering Library was named the Dorothy Hill Physical Sciences and Engineering Library in her honour.

In 2014, the School of Earth Sciences at the University of Queensland named their research vessel, RV D Hill, to honour her legacy to fossil coral research.

Since 2002, the Australian Academy of Science has awarded the Dorothy Hill Award for female researchers in earth sciences. The Queensland Division of the Geological Society of Australia also awards a Dorothy Hill Medal to individuals who have made significant contributions to the advancement of knowledge of Queensland geology.

In 2016 Dr Gilbert Price and colleagues at the University of Queensland School of Earth Sciences located Hill's rock hammer and created a 3D model of it for an exhibition to celebrate her life. Gilbert Price included the 3D image in an article about Hill and her hammer.

The electoral district of Hill created in the 2017 Queensland state electoral redistribution was named after her, in recognition of her work for the Great Barrier Reef.

The University of Queensland's School of Earth and Environmental Sciences hosted the biannual Dorothy Hill Women in Earth Sciences Symposium in 2017, 2019 and will again 2021.

A street in the village designed for the 2018 Gold Coast Commonwealth Games, has also been named in her honour.

An astronomical observatory is being named for Hill at the Brisbane Girls Grammar School's Marrapatta Open Education Campus.

Dorothy Hill was the subject of a Google Doodle on 10 September 2018, the 111th anniversary of her birth.

== Comprehensive bibliography ==
1. Hill, D., 1930. The stratigraphical relationship of the shales about Esk to the sediments of the Ipswich Basin. Proceedings of the Royal Society of Queensland, 41, 162–191.
2. Hill, D., 1930. The development of the Esk Series between Esk and Linville. Proceedings of the Royal Society of Queensland, 42, 28–48.
3. Hill, D., 1934. The Lower Carboniferous corals of Australia. Proceedings of the Royal Society of Queensland, 45, 63–115.
4. Hill, D., 1935. British terminology for rugose corals. Geological Magazine, 72, 481–519.
5. Hill, D., Butler, A.J., Oakley, K.P. & Arkell, W. J., 1936. Report of 'Coral Reef' meeting at Wenlock Edge, the Dudley district and the Oxford district. Proceedings of the Geologists' Association, 47, 130–139.
6. Hill, D., 1936. Upper Devonian corals from Western Australia. Journal of the Royal Society of Western Australia, 22, 25–39.
7. Hill, D., 1936. The British Silurian rugose corals with acanthine septa. Philosophical Transactions of the Royal Society of London, ser. B, 226, 189–217.
8. Hill, D. & Butler, A.J., 1936. Cymatelasma, a new genus of Silurian rugose corals. Geological Magazine, 73, 516–527.
9. Hill, D., 1937. Type specimens of Palaeozoic corals from New South Wales in W.B. Clarke's First Collection, and in the Strzelecki Collection. Geological Magazine, 74, 145- 153.
10. Hill, D., 1937. The Permian corals of Western Australia. Journal of the Royal Society of Western Australia, 23, 43–63.
11. Hill, D., 1938. Euryphyllum: a new genus of Permian zaphrentoid rugose corals. Proceedings of the Royal Society of Queensland, 49, 23–28.
12. Hill, D., 1938. A scientific expedition to Moreton Bay. Australian Journal of Science, 1, 28–30.
13. Hill, D. & Smyth, L.B., 1938. On the identity of Monilopora Nicholson and Etheridge, 1879, with Cladochonus McCoy, 1847. Proceedings of the Royal Irish Academy, sec. B, 45, 125–138.
14. Hill, D., 1938–41. A monograph on the Carboniferous rugose corals of Scotland: Pt 1, 1937 (1938), 1–78; Pt 2, 1938 (1939), 79–114; Pt 3, 1940, 115–204; Pt 4, 1941, 205–213. Palaeontographical Society, London.
15. Hill, D., 1939. The Middle Devonian rugose corals of Queensland, I. Douglas Creek and Drummond Creek, Clermont district. Proceedings of the Royal Society of Queensland, 50, 55–65.
16. Hill, D., 1939. The Devonian rugose corals of Lilydale and Loyola, Victoria. Proceedings of the Royal Society of Victoria, 51, 219–256.
17. Hill, D., 1939. Western Australian Devonian corals in the Wade Collection. Journal of the Royal Society of Western Australia, 25, 141–151.
18. Hill, D., 1940. The Middle Devonian rugose corals of Queensland, II. The Silverwood-Lucky Valley area. Proceedings of the Royal Society of Queensland, 51, 150–168.
19. Hill, D. (Jones, O.A. & Hill, D.), 1940. The Heliolitidae of Australia, with a discussion of the morphology and systematic position of the family. Proceedings of the Royal Society of Queensland, 51, 183–215.
20. Hill, D., 1940. The Silurian Rugosa of the Yass-Bowning district, NSW. Proceedings of the Linnean Society of New South Wales, 65, 388–420.
21. Hill, D. & Jones, O.A., 1940. The corals of the Garra Beds, Molong district, New South Wales. Journal and Proceedings of the Royal Society of New South Wales, 74, 175–208.
22. Hill, D., 1940. The lower Middle Devonian rugose corals of the Murrumbidgee and Goodradigbee Rivers, N.S.W. Journal and Proceedings of the Royal Society of New South Wales, 74, 247–276.
23. Hill, D., 1940. Geology of the Darling Downs. In: Centenary Souvenir, Darling Downs, 1840–1940, Toowoomba, 25–27.
24. Hill, D. & Edwards, A.B., 1941. Note on a collection of fossils from Queenstown, Tasmania. Proceedings of the Royal Society of Victoria, 53, 22–230.
25. Hill, D. (Bryan, W.H. & Hill, D.), 1941. Spherulitic crystallisation as a mechanism of skeletal growth in the hexacorals. Proceedings of the Royal Society of Queensland, 52, 78–91.
26. Hill, D., 1942. Further Permian corals from Western Australia. Journal of the Royal Society of Western Australia, 27, 57–75.
27. Hill, D., 1942. The Middle Devonian rugose corals of Queensland, III. Burdekin Downs, Fanning R., and Reid Gap, north Queensland. Proceedings of the Royal Society of Queensland, 53, 229–268.
28. Hill, D. (Richards, H.C. & Hill, D.), 1942. Great Barrier Reef bores, 1926 and 1937. Descriptions, analyses and interpretations. Report of the Great Barrier Reef Committee, 5, 1–111.
29. Hill, D., 1942. Some Tasmanian Palaeozoic corals. Papers and Proceedings of the Royal Society of Tasmania, 1941, 3–12.
30. Hill, D., 1942. The Lower Devonian rugose corals from the Mt. Etna Limestone, Qld. Proceedings of the Royal Society of Queensland, 54, 13–22.
31. Hill, D., 1942. The Devonian rugose corals of the Tamworth district, N.S.W. Journal and Proceedings of the Royal Society of New South Wales, 76, 142–164.
32. Hill, D., 1942. Middle Palaeozoic rugose corals from the Wellington district, N.S.W. Journal and Proceedings of the Royal Society of New South Wales, 76, 182–189.
33. Hill, D., 1943. A re-interpretation of the Australian Palaeozoic record, based on a study of the rugose corals. Proceedings of the Royal Society of Queensland 54, 53–66.
34. Hill, D., 1947. Notes on the geology of the Noosa district, Queensland Naturalist, 13, 43–46.
35. Hill, D., 1947. Report on tabulate corals from Eildon Dam spillway, Victoria. Memoirs of the Geological Survey of Victoria, 16, Appendix 1, p. 41.
36. Hill, D., 1947. Robert Logan Jack: a memorial address. Proceedings of the Royal Society of Queensland, 58, 113–124.
37. Hill, D., 1948. Notes on the geology of Somerset Dam. Queensland Naturalist, 13, 90–94.
38. Hill, D., 1948. The distribution and sequence of Carboniferous coral faunas. Geological Magazine, 85, 121–148.
39. Hill, D., 1949. Jack, Robert Logan (1845–1921). In Dictionary of Australian biography, vol. 1, P. Serle, (ed.), Angus & Robertson, Sydney & London, 469.
40. Hill, D., 1950. The Productinae of the Artinskian Cracow Fauna of Queensland. Papers Department of Geology, University of Queensland, 3 (2), 1–27.
41. Hill, D., 1950. Middle Devonian corals from the Buchan district, Victoria. Proceedings of the Royal Society of Victoria. 62, 137–164.
42. Hill, D., 1951. Geology. In: Handbook of Queensland. 28th Meeting, Australian and New Zealand Association for the Advancement of Science, Brisbane, 12–24.
43. Hill, D., 1951. The Ordovician corals. Proceedings of the Royal Society of Queensland, 62, 1–27.
44. Hill, D., 1952. Some late Palaeozoic corals from Southland, New Zealand. New Zealand Geological Survey Palaeontological Bulletin, 19, 18–25.
45. Hill, D., 1952. The Gondwana System in Queensland. Report of the 19th International Geological Congress, Algiers, 35–49.
46. Hill, D., 1953. The Middle Ordovician of the Oslo region, Norway. 2. Some rugose and tabulate corals. Norsk Geologisk Tidsskrift, 31, 143–168.
47. Hill, D., Tweedale, G.W., Campbell, K.S.W. & Hawthorne, W.L., 1953. Geological Map of Queensland, 40 miles to 1 inch. Queensland Department of Mines, Brisbane.
48. Hill, D., 1953. Outline of the geology of Queensland. 5th Empire Mining Metallurgical Congress Handbook, Australia and New Zealand, 117–123.
49. Hill, D., 1954. The care of type specimens. News Bulletin, Geological Society of Australia, 2, 2–3.
50. Hill, D., 1954. Coral faunas from the Silurian of New South Wales and the Devonian of Western Australia. Bulletin of the Bureau of Mineral Resources, Geology and Geophysics, Australia, 23, 1–51.
51. Hill, D., 1954. Devonian corals from Waratah Bay, Victoria. Proceedings of the Royal Society of Victoria, 66, 105–118.
52. Hill, D., 1955. Contributions to the correlation and fauna of the Permian in Australia and New Zealand. Journal of the Geological Society of Australia, 2, 83–107.
53. Hill, D. & Tweedale, G.W., 1955. Geological Map of Moreton District, S.E. Q. 6 miles to 1 inch. Queensland Department of Mines, Brisbane.
54. Hill, D., 1955. Ordovician corals from Ida Bay, Queenstown and Zeehan, Tasmania. Papers and Proceedings of the Royal Society of Tasmania, 89, 237–254.
55. Hill, D., 1956. The Devonian corals of Reefton, New Zealand. New Zealand Geological Survey Palaeontological Bulletin, 25, 5–14.
56. Hill, D. & Wells, J.W., 1956. Cnidaria – general features. In : Treatise on invertebrate palaeontology. Part F, Coelenterata, Moore, R.C. (ed.), Geological Society of America and University of Kansas Press, Lawrence, Kansas, F5-9.
57. Hill, D. & Wells, J.W., 1956. Hydrozoa – general features. In : Treatise on invertebrate palaeontology, Part F, Coelentarata, Moore, R.C. (ed.), Geological Society of America and University of Kansas Press, Lawrence, Kansas, F 67.
58. Hill, D. & Wells, J.W., 1956. Hydroida and Spongiomorphida. In : Treatise on invertebrate palaeontology, Part F, Coelenterata, Moore, R.C. (ed.), Geological Society of America and University of Kansas Press, Lawrence, Kansas, F81-89.
59. Hill, D. (Wells, J.W. & Hill, D.), 1956. Anthozoa – general features. In : Treatise on invertebrate palaeontology, Part F, Caelenterata, Moore, R.C. (ed.), Geological Society of America and University of Kansas Press, Lawrence, Kansas, F161-165.
60. Hill, D. (Wells, J.W. & Hill, D.), 1956. Ceriantipatharia. In : Treatise on invertebrate palaeontology, Part F, Coelenterata, Moore, R.C. (ed.), Geological Society of America and University of Kansas Press, Lawrence, Kansas, F165-166.
61. Hill, D. (Wells, J.W. & Hill, D.), 1956. Zoantharia – general features. In : Treatise on invertebrate palaeontology, Part F, Coelenterata, Moore, R.C. (ed.), Geological Society of America and University of Kansas Press, Lawrence, Kansas, F231-232.
62. Hill, D. (Wells, J.W. & Hill, D.), 1956. Zoantharia, Corallimorpharia, and Actiniaria. In : Treatise on invertebrate palaeontology, Part F, Coelenterata, Moore, R.C. (ed.), Geological Society of America and University of Kansas Press, Lawrence, Kansas, F232-233.
63. Hill, D., 1956. Rugosa. In : Treatise on invertebrate palaeontology, Part F, Coelenterata, Moore, R.C. (ed.), Geological Society of America and University of Kansas Press, Lawrence, Kansas, F233-324.
64. Hill, D., 1956. Heterocorallia. In : Treatise on invertebrate palaeontology, Part F, Coelenterata, Moore, R.C. (ed.), Geological Society of America and University of Kansas Press, Lawrence, Kansas, F324-327.
65. Hill, D. & Stumm, E.C., 1956. Tabulata. In : Treatise on invertebrate palaeontology, Part F, Coelenterata, Moore, R.C. (ed.), Geological Society of America and University of Kansas Press, Lawrence, Kansas, F444-477.
66. Hill, D., 1956. Zoantharia incertae sedis. In : Treatise on invertebrate palaeontology, Part F, Coelenterata, Moore, R.C. (ed.), Geological Society of America and University of Kansas Press, Lawrence, Kansas, F477.
67. Hill, D. (Wells, J.W. & Hill, D.), 1956. Ctenophora. In : Treatise on invertebrate palaeontology, Part F, Coelenterata, Moore, R.C. (ed.), Geological Society of America and University of Kansas Press, Lawrence, Kansas, F478.
68. Hill, D., 1956. Springsure – 4-mile geological series sheet G/55-3, Australian National Grid. Bureau of Mineral Resources, Geology and Geophysics, Australia, Canberra.
69. Hill, D., 1956. The sequence and distribution of upper Palaeozoic coral faunas. Australian Journal of Science, 19, 42–61.
70. Hill, D., 1957. Ordovician corals from New South Wales. Journal and Proceedings of the Royal Society of New South Wales, 91, 97–107.
71. Hill, D., 1957. Explanatory notes to the Springsure 4-mile geological series sheet G/55-3, Australian National Grid. Bureau Mineral Resources Australia Notes, 5, 1–19.
72. Hill, D., 1958. Introduction (An outline of the geology of Queensland). In Lexicon de Stratigraphie – vol. 6 Océanie – Fasc. 5 Australie – Fasc. 5a Queensland. Lexique Stratigraphique International – Commission de Stratigraphie, Centre national de la Recherche Scientifique, Paris, 9–12.
73. Hill, D., 1959. Sakmarian geography. Geologischen Rundschau, 47, 590–629.
74. Hill, D., 1959. Distribution and sequence of Silurian coral faunas. Journal and Proceedings of the Royal Society of New South Wales, 92, 151–173.
75. Hill, D., 1959. Some Ordovician corals from New Mexico, Arizona and Texas. Bulletin of the State Bureau of Mines and Mineral Resources New Mexico, 64, 1–25.
76. Hill, D., 1960. Geology as a subject for secondary schools. Australian Science Teachers Journal, 6, 59–60.
77. Hill, D., 1960. Possible intermediates between Alcyonaria and Tabulata, Tabulata and Rugosa, and Rugosa and Hexacoralla. Report of the 21st International geological Congress, Copenhagen, 22, 51–58.
78. Hill, D. & Denmead, A.K. (eds),1960. The geology of Queensland. Journal of the Geological Society of Australia, 7, 1–474. [Chapter 1, Geological Structure, and parts of Chapters 5 Devonian, 7 Permian, 8 Triassic, 10 Cretaceous and 13 Upper Cainozoic were contributed by D. Hill.]
79. Hill, D., 1960. Contribution to the stratigraphical colloquium. In Compte Rendu du quatriéme Congrés pour l'advacement des études de Géologie du Carbonifère, Heerlen, 1958, vol. 1, Ernst von Aelst, Maestricht, 289–292.
80. Hill, D., 1961. Geology of south-eastern Queensland. In Handbook for Queensland, 35th Meeting, Australian and New Zealand Association for the Advancement of Science, Brisbane, 1–11.
81. Hill, D., 1961. Circum- or Trans-Pacific correlation of Palaeozoic coral faunas. Proceedings of the Ninth Pacific Science Congress, 12, 246–248.
82. Hill, D., 1961. Contributions to Canadian palaeontology part I. On the Ordovician corals Palaeophyllum rugosum Billings and Nyctopora billingsii Nicholson. Bulletin of the Geological Survey of Canada, 80, 1–7.
83. Hill, D. & Wilson, A.F., 1961. Obituary notice – Richard Gradwell. Proceedings of the Geological Society of London, 1592, 146.
84. Hill, D. & Maxwell, W.G.H., 1962. Elements of the stratigraphy of Queensland. University of Queensland Press, Brisbane, 71 p.
85. Hill, D. & Woods, J.T., (eds), 1964. Permian index fossils of Queensland. Queensland Palaeontographical Society, Brisbane, 1–32.
86. Hill, D., 1964. Archaeocyatha from the Shackelton Limestone of the Ross System, Nimrod Glacier area, Antarctica. Transactions of the Royal Society of New Zealand (Geology), 2, 137–146.
87. Hill, D., 1964. The phylum Archaeocyatha. Biological Reviews, 39, 232–258.
88. Hill, D. & Woods, J.T. (eds), 1964. Carboniferous fossils of Queensland. Queensland Palaeontographical Society, Brisbane, 1–32.
89. Hill, D., 1964. Archaeocyatha from loose material at Plunket Point at the head of Beardmore Glacier. In Antarctic geology. Proceedings of the First International Symposium on Antarctic Geology, Cape Town, 15–21 September 1963, R.J. Adie, ed., North-Holland Publishing Co., Amsterdam, 609–619.
90. Hill, D., 1965. Archaeocyatha from Antarctica and a review of the phylum. Trans-Antarctic Expedition 1955–1958, Scientific Reports 10 (Geol. 3), 1–151.
91. Hill, D., 1965. Determinations of Palaeozoic faunas. Bulletin of the Bureau of Mineral Resources, Geology and Geophysics, Australia, 71, Appendix 2, 151.
92. Hill, D. & Jull, R.K., 1965. Note on Campophyllum flexuosum (Goldfuss). Geological Magazine, 102, 206–212.
93. Hill, D., Playford, G. & Woods, J.T. (eds), 1965. Triassic fossils of Queensland. Queensland Palaeontographical Society, Brisbane, 1–32.
94. Hill, D., Playford, G. & Woods, J.T. (eds), 1966. Jurassic fossils of Queensland. Queensland Palaeontographical Society, Brisbane, 1–32.
95. Hill, D., 1966. Memorial Walter Heywood Bryan, M.C., D.Sc. 1891–1966. Journal of the Geological Society of Australia, 13, 613–618.
96. Hill, D., Playford, G. & Woods, J.T. (eds), 1967. Devonian fossils of Queensland, Queensland Palaeontographical Society, Brisbane, 1–32.
97. Hill, D. & Maxwell, W.G.H., 1967. Elements of the stratigraphy of Queensland. 2nd ed., University of Queensland Press, Brisbane, 1–78.
98. Hill, D., 1967. Obituary Walter Heywood Bryan. Proceedings of the Royal Society of Queensland, 78, 113–114.v
99. Hill, D., 1967. The sequence and distribution of Ludlovian, Lower Devonian, and Couvinian faunas in the Union of Soviet Socialist Republics. Palaeontology, 10, 660–693.
100. Hill, D., 1967. Phylum Archaeocyatha Vologdin 1937. In: Harland, W. B. et al. (eds) The fossil record, Geological Society of London, London, 341–345.
101. Hill, D., 1967. Devonian of eastern Australia. In : International symposium on the Devonian System, Calgary, 1967, vol. 1, Oswald, D.H. (ed.), Alberta Society of Petroleum Geologists, Calgary, 613–630.
102. Hill, D., 1968. The earth beneath Queensland. Queensland Naturalists, 18, 97–105.
103. Hill, D., 1968. Archaeocyatha. In : Developments, trends and outlooks in palaeontology, Moore, R.C. (ed.), Journal of Paleontology, 42, 1358–1359.
104. Hill, D., 1968. Palaeozoic corals. In Developments, trends and outlooks in palaeontology, Moore, R.C. (ed.), Journal of Paleontology, 42, 1361.
105. Hill, D., Playford, G. & Woods, J.T. (eds), 1968. Cretaceous fossils of Queensland. Queensland Palaeontographical Society, Brisbane, 1–35.
106. Hill, D., & Jell, J.S., 1969. On the rugose coral genera Rhizophyllum Lindstrom, Platyphyllum Lindstrom and Calceola Lamarck. Neues Jarbuch fur Geologie und Palaontologie Monatshefte, 1969 (9), 534–551.
107. Hill, D., Playford, G. & Woods, J.T. (eds), 1969. Ordovician and Silurian fossils of Queensland. Queensland Palaeontographical Society, Brisbane, 1–32.
108. Hill, D. (Jell, J.S. & Hill, D.), 1969. Devonian corals from the Ukalunda district, north Queensland. Publications of the Geological Survey of Queensland, 340, Palaeontological papers 16, 1–27.
109. Hill, D. (Jell, J.S. & Hill, D.), 1970. Redescription of the lectotypes of the Devonian tabulate corals Roemeria infundibulifera (Goldfuss), Roemeripora minor (Schlüter) and Favosites goldfussi d'Orbigny. Geological Magazine, 107, 159–166.
110. Hill, D. (Jell, J.S. & Hill, D.), 1970. The Devonian coral fauna of the Point Hibbs Limestone, Tasmania. Papers and Proceedings of the Royal Society of Tasmania, 104, 1–16.
111. Hill, D. (Jell, J.S. & Hill, D.), 1970. Revision of the coral fauna from the Devonian Douglas Creek Limestone, Clermont, central Queensland. Proceedings of the Royal Society of Queensland, 81, 93–120.
112. Hill, D. (Jell, J.S. & Hill, D.), 1970. A redescription of the holotype of the Devonian rugose coral Utaratuia laevigata Crickmay. Journal of Paleontology, 44, 833–835.
113. Hill, D. 1970. The Great Barrier Reef. In : Badger, G.M. (ed.), Captain Cook, navigator and scientist. Australian Academy of Science, Canberra, 70–86.
114. Hill, D. & Jell, J.S., 1970. The tabulate coral families Syringolitidae Hinde, Roemeriidae Pocta, Neoroemeriidae Radugin and Chonostegitidae Lecompte, and Australian species of Roemeripora Kraicz. Proceedings of the Royal Society of Victoria, 83, 171–190.
115. Hill, D., Playford, G. & Woods, J.T. (eds), 1970. Cainozoic fossils of Queensland. Queensland Palaeontographical Society, Brisbane, 36 p.
116. Hill, D. & Jell, J.S., 1970. Devonian corals from the Canning Basin, Western Australia. Bulletin of the Geological Survey of Western Australia, 121, 1–158.
117. Hill, D., 1970. The fossils of Mt. Etna Limestone. In : Sprent, J.K. (ed.), Mount Etna caves, University of Queensland Speleological Society, Brisbane, 37–38.
118. Hill, D., 1971. The bearing of some upper Palaeozoic reefs and coral faunas on the hypotheses of continental drift. Journal and Proceedings of the Royal Society of New South Wales, 103, 93–102.
119. Hill, D., Playford, G. & Woods, J.T. (eds), 1971. Cambrian fossils of Queensland. Queensland Palaeontographical Society, Brisbane, 1–32.
120. Hill, D., 1971. Tabulata. In : McGraw-Hill Encyclopedia of Science and Technology, 3rd Edition, McGraw-Hill, New York, 403.
121. Hill, D., 1971. Heterocorallia. In: McGraw-Hill Encyclopedia of Science and Technology, 3rd Edition, McGraw-Hill, New York, 483.
122. Hill, D., 1971. Spongiomorphida. In : McGraw-Hill Encyclopedia of Science and Technology, 3rd Edition, McGraw-Hill, New York, 9.
123. Hill, D., 1972. Archaeocyatha. In : Treatise on invertebrate palaeontology, Part E, Vol. 1 (of 2), Archaeocyatha, 2nd ed., Teichert, C. (ed.), Geological Society of America and University of Kansas Press, Boulder, Colorado & Lawrence, Kansas, E1-158.
124. Hill, D., 1972. Fossils. N.S.C.M. Geology Series, G14, Jacaranda Press, Brisbane, 91p.
125. Hill, D., Playford, G. & Woods, J.T. (eds), 1972. Permian fossils of Queensland. (Revised edition), Queensland Palaeontographical Society, Brisbane, 1–32.
126. Hill, D., 1972. Edward Oswald Marks 1882–1971. Queensland Naturalist, 20, 124–129.
127. Hill, D., 1972. The scientific work of Martin F. Glaessner, palaeontologist and historical geologist. Special Papers Centre Pre-Cambrian Research, University of Adelaide, 1, 1–11.
128. Hill, D., Playford, G. & Woods, J.T. (eds), 1972. Select bibliography of Queensland fossils. Queensland Palaeontographical Society, Brisbane, 1–15.
129. Hill, D., 1973. Lower Carboniferous corals. In : Hallam, A. (ed.), Atlas of palaeobiogeography, Elsevier, Amsterdam, 133–142.
130. Hill, D., 1974. Carpentaria, Gulf of. Encyclopædia Britannica, 15th ed., Macropaedia 3, 951–952.
131. Hill, D., 1974. Coral islands, coral reefs and atolls. Encyclopædia Britannica, 15th ed., Macropaedia 5, 162–167.
132. Hill, D., 1974. Eyre, Lake. Encyclopædia Britannica 15th ed., Macropaedia 7, 125–126.
133. Hill, D., 1974. Great Barrier Reef. Encyclopædia Britannica, 15th ed., Macropaedia 8, 299–300.
134. Hill, D., 1974. Physiotherapy as a university subject in Queensland. Australian Journal of Physiotherapy, 20, 117–128.
135. Hill, D., 1974. An introduction to the Great Barrier Reef. In : Cameron, A.L. et al. (eds), Proceedings of the 2nd International Symposium on Coral Reefs, vol. 2, The Great Barrier Reef Committee, Brisbane, 723–731.
136. Hill, D. (Jell, J.S. & Hill, D.), 1974. The microstructure of corals. Trudy Instituta Geologii Geofiziki, 201(1), 8–14, 267–268.
137. Hill, D., 1975. Australia – Queensland. In : Encyclopaedia of Earth Sciences vol. 8, of World Regional Geology. Part 1, Western Hemisphere, Fairbridge, R.W. (ed.), Dowden, Hutchinson & Ross, Inc., Stroudsburg, Pennsylvania, 56–61.
138. Hill, D., 1976. A personal view of this university's history. Queensland University News, 66, 2–3.
139. Hill, D., 1976. The history and contemporary state of life sciences in Australian Universities. I. Geology. The Australian University, 14, 84–98.
140. Hill, D., 1978. Bibliography and index of Australian Palaeozoic corals. Paper Department of Geology University of Queensland, 8(4), 1–38.
141. Hill, D. & Willadsen, C., 1980. Bibliography of Australian geological serials and of other Australian periodicals that include geological papers. Papers Department of Geology University of Queensland, 9(3), 1–76.
142. Hill, D., 1980. Coral bibliographies of some 20th century British geologists including their coral, biostratigraphical and palaeontological papers. Fossil Cnidaria, 9(2), 27–38.
143. Hill, D., 1981. Rugosa and Tabulata. In: Teichert, C. (ed.), Treatise on invertebrate palaeontology, Part F, Coelenterata, Supplement 1, 2 vols, Geological Society of America and University of Kansas Press, Boulder, Colorado & Lawrence, Kansas, xi + 762 p.
144. Hill, D., 1981. The first fifty years of the department of geology of the University of Queensland. Papers Department of Geology, University of Queensland, 10 (1), 1–68.
145. Hill, D., 1981. Select list of biographies and bibliographies of workers on the taxonomy and biostratigraphy of Palaeozoic corals. Fossil Cnidaria, 10 (2), 16–30.
146. Hill, D., 1984. The Great Barrier Reef Committee, 1922–1982: The first thirty years. Historical Records of Australian Science, 6, 1–18.
147. Hill, D., 1985. The Great Barrier Reef Committee, 1922–82. Part II: The last three decades. Historical Records of Australian Science, 6, 195–221.
148. Hill, D., 1987. Edwin Sherbon Hills: 31 August 1906 – 2 May 1986. Elected F.R.S. 1954. Biographical Memoirs of Fellows of the Royal Society, 33, 291–323.

== See also ==
- Timeline of women in science

== Bibliography ==
- Turner, Susan (1970–1980). "Hill, Dorothy". Dictionary of Scientific Biography. Vol. 21. New York: Charles Scribner's Sons. pp. 315–320. ISBN 978-0-684-10114-9.

Awards
Preceded by Mabel Josephine Mackerras	Clarke Medal; 1966	Succeeded by Spencer Smith-White
