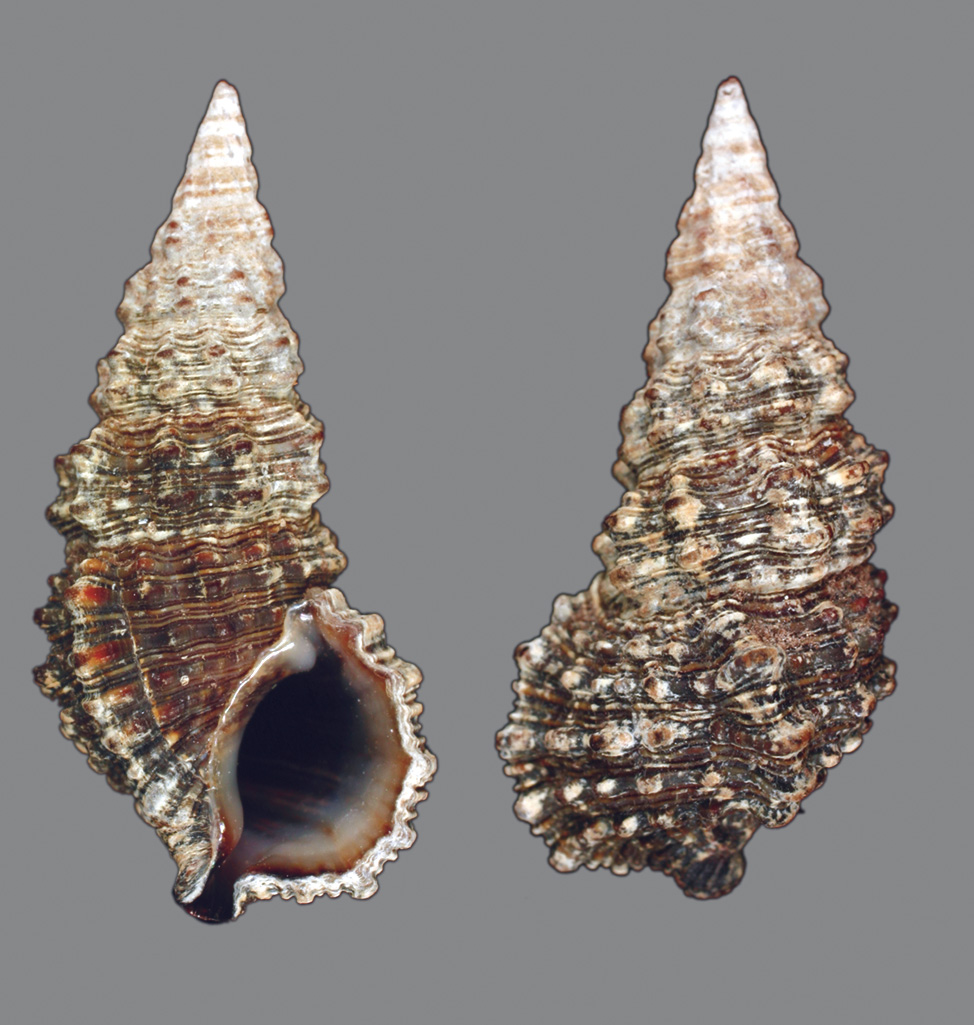
- Shell of Clypeomorus pellucida (specimen at MNHN, Paris)

Scientific classification
- Kingdom: Animalia
- Phylum: Mollusca
- Class: Gastropoda
- Subclass: Caenogastropoda
- Order: incertae sedis
- Family: Cerithiidae
- Genus: Clypeomorus; Jousseaume, 1888

Type species
- Clypeomorus clypeomorus Jousseaume, F.P., 1888

Synonyms
- Cerithium (Clypeomorus) Jousseaume, 1888

= Clypeomorus =

Genus of gastropods

Clypeomorus is a genus of sea snails, marine gastropod mollusks in the subfamily Cerithiinae of the family Cerithiidae.

== Distribution ==
The species of this marine genus occurs in the Indo-West Pacific, from the Red Sea to the Marshall Islands: off Australia (New South Wales, Northern Territory, Queensland and Western Australia)

== Species ==
Species within the genus Clypeomorus include:

- Clypeomorus admirabilis Houbrick, 1985
- Clypeomorus adunca (Gould, 1849)
- † Clypeomorus alasaensis Wissema, 1947
- Clypeomorus batillariaeformis Habe & Kosuge, 1966
- Clypeomorus bifasciata (G.B. Sowerby II, 1855)
- Clypeomorus brevis (Quoy & Gaimard, 1834)
- Clypeomorus inflata (Quoy & Gaimard, 1834)
- Clypeomorus irrorata (Gould, 1849)
- Clypeomorus isselii (Pagenstecher, 1877)
- Clypeomorus mccooli Poppe & Tagaro, 2026
- Clypeomorus nympha Houbrick, 1985
- Clypeomorus pellucida (Hombron & Jacquinot, 1852)
- Clypeomorus petrosa (Wood, 1828)
- Clypeomorus purpurastoma Houbrick, 1985
- Clypeomorus subbrevicula (Oöstingh, 1925)
- † Clypeomorus tjilonganensis (K. Martin, 1899)
- † Clypeomorus verbeekii (Woodward, 1880)

Species brought into synonymy

- Clypeomorus bifasciatum [sic]: synonym of Clypeomorus bifasciatus (G.B. Sowerby II, 1855)
- Clypeomorus caeruleum (G.B. Sowerby II, 1855): synonym of Cerithium caeruleum G.B. Sowerby II, 1855
- Clypeomorus chemnitziana (Pilsbry, 1901): synonym of Clypeomorus petrosa chemnitziana (Pilsbry, 1901)
- Clypeomorus clypeomorus Jousseaume, 1888: synonym of Clypeomorus bifasciatus (G.B. Sowerby II, 1855)
- Clypeomorus concisus (Hombron & Jacquinot, 1852): synonym of Clypeomorus bifasciatus (G.B. Sowerby II, 1855)
- Clypeomorus coralium (Kiener, 1841): synonym of Cerithium coralium Kiener, 1841
- Clypeomorus gennesi (H. Fischer & Vignal, 1901): synonym of Clanculus tonnerrei (G. Nevill & H. Nevill, 1874)
- Clypeomorus moniliferus (Kiener, 1841): synonym of Clypeomorus batillariaeformis Habe & Kosuge, 1966
- Clypeomorus morus (Lamarck, 1822): synonym of Clypeomorus bifasciatus (G.B. Sowerby II, 1855)
- Clypeomorus penthusarus Iredale, 1929: synonym of Clypeomorus bifasciatus (G.B. Sowerby II, 1855)
- Clypeomorus petrosa (Wood, 1828): synonym of Clypeomorus petrosa petrosa (Wood, 1828)
- Clypeomorus traillii (G.B. Sowerby II, 1855): synonym of Cerithium traillii G.B. Sowerby II, 1855
- Clypeomorus tuberculatus (Linnaeus, 1767): synonym of Cerithium tuberculatum (Linnaeus, 1767)
- Clypeomorus zonatus (Wood, 1828): synonym of Cerithium zonatum (Wood, 1828)
