= Gourmya =

Scientific classification
- Kingdom: Animalia
- Phylum: Mollusca
- Class: Gastropoda
- Subclass: Caenogastropoda
- Order: incertae sedis
- Family: Cerithiidae
- Genus: Gourmya; Bayle, 1884

Type species
- Gourmya gourmyi Crosse, H., 1861

Genus of gastropods

Gourmya is a genus of sea snails, marine gastropod mollusks in the family Cerithiidae.

== Species ==
Species within the genus Gourmya include:

- Gourmya gourmyi (Crosse, 1861)
- Gourmya (Gladiocerithium) argutum (Monterosato, 1911)

Species brought into synonymy

- Gourmya echinata (Lamarck, 1822) accepted as Cerithium echinatum Lamarck, 1822
