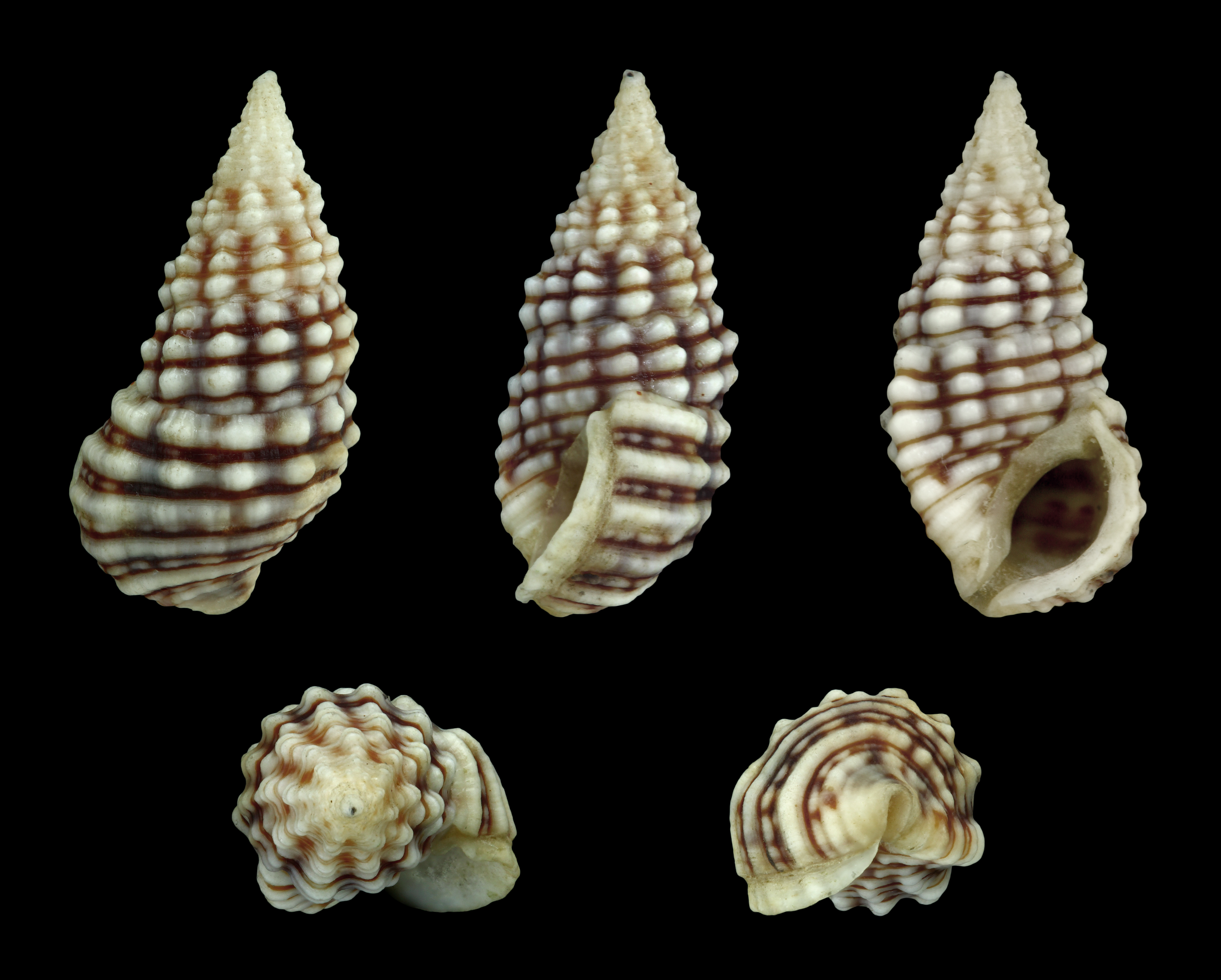

Scientific classification
- Kingdom: Animalia
- Phylum: Mollusca
- Class: Gastropoda
- Subclass: Caenogastropoda
- Order: incertae sedis
- Family: Cerithiidae
- Genus: Clypeomorus
- Species: C. bifasciata
- Subspecies: C. b. persica

Trinomial name
- Clypeomorus bifasciata persica Houbrick, 1985

= Clypeomorus bifasciata persica =

Species of gastropod

Clypeomorus bifasciata persica is a subspecies of sea snail, a marine gastropod mollusc in the family Cerithiidae.

== Description ==
The size of the shell varies between 9 mm and 15 mm.

== Distribution ==
This marine species occurs in the Persian Gulf.
