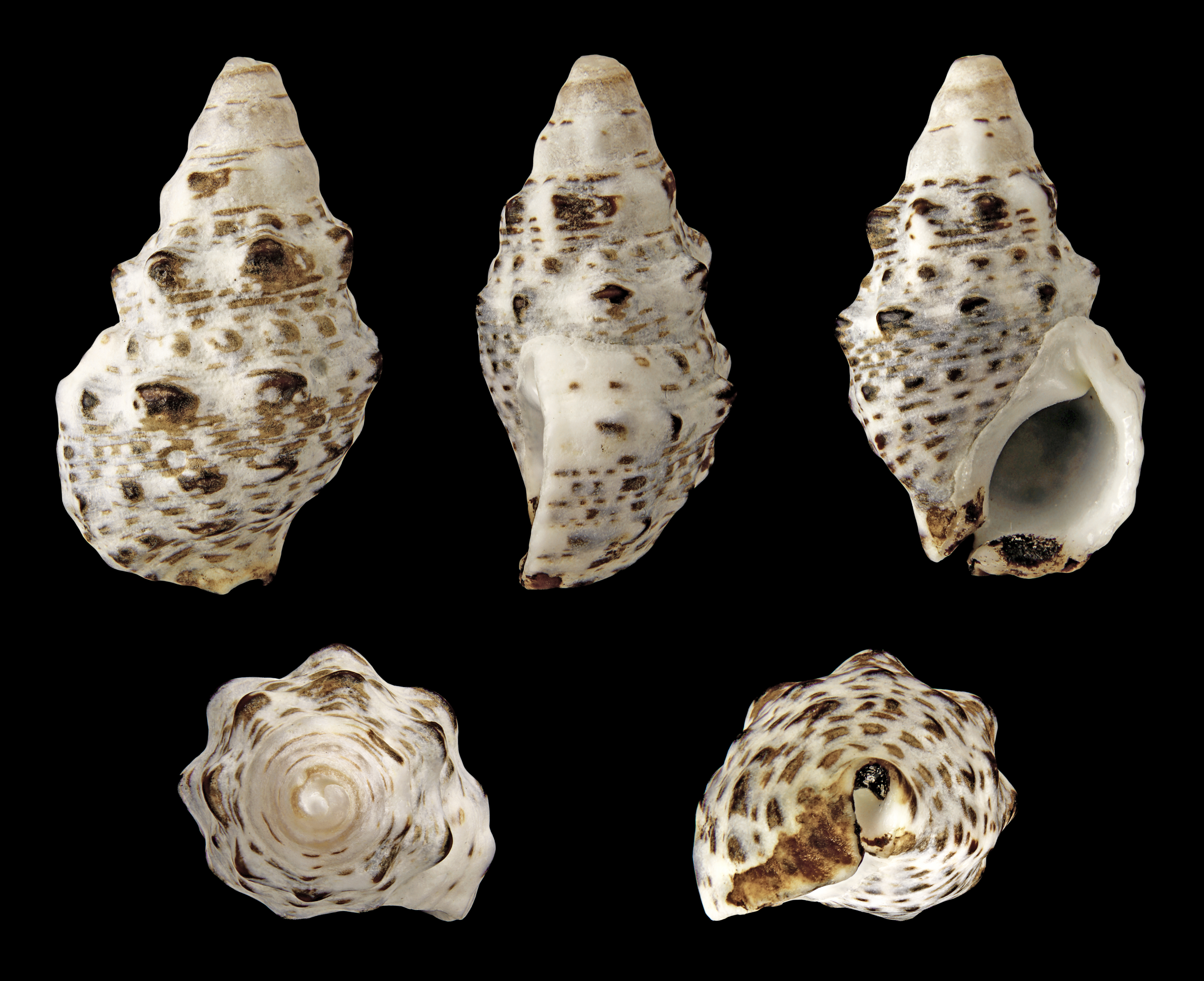
- Five views of a shell of Cerithium caeruleum

Scientific classification
- Kingdom: Animalia
- Phylum: Mollusca
- Class: Gastropoda
- Subclass: Caenogastropoda
- Order: incertae sedis
- Family: Cerithiidae
- Genus: Cerithium
- Species: C. caeruleum

Binomial name
- Cerithium caeruleum G.B. Sowerby II, 1855

Synonyms
- Cerithium caeruleum var. minima H. Fischer & Vignal, 1901; Cerithium tuberculatum Lamarck, 1822; Clypeomorus caeruleum (G.B. Sowerby II, 1855); Vertagus schroteri Mörch, 1852

= Cerithium caeruleum =

Cerith sand snail

Species of gastropod

Cerithium caeruleum, the Cerith sand snail, is a species of sea snail, a marine gastropod mollusk in the family Cerithiidae. It is generally found in large populations on intertidal rocky shores with a thin layer of sediments. They have large and solid shells, and their radula ribbon robust long about one-fifth the shell length. This species lives in the planktonic stage from 90 to 120 days and has a seven-year life history. This common intertidal species is confined to east Africa, Madagascar, and the Arabian Peninsula and is unlikely to be confused with any other Cerithium species. It is distinguished by its squat, knobby shape; and as indicated by its name, caeruleum, a grayish blue color with spiral rows of black tubercles.

== Description ==
=== 1. Shell ===
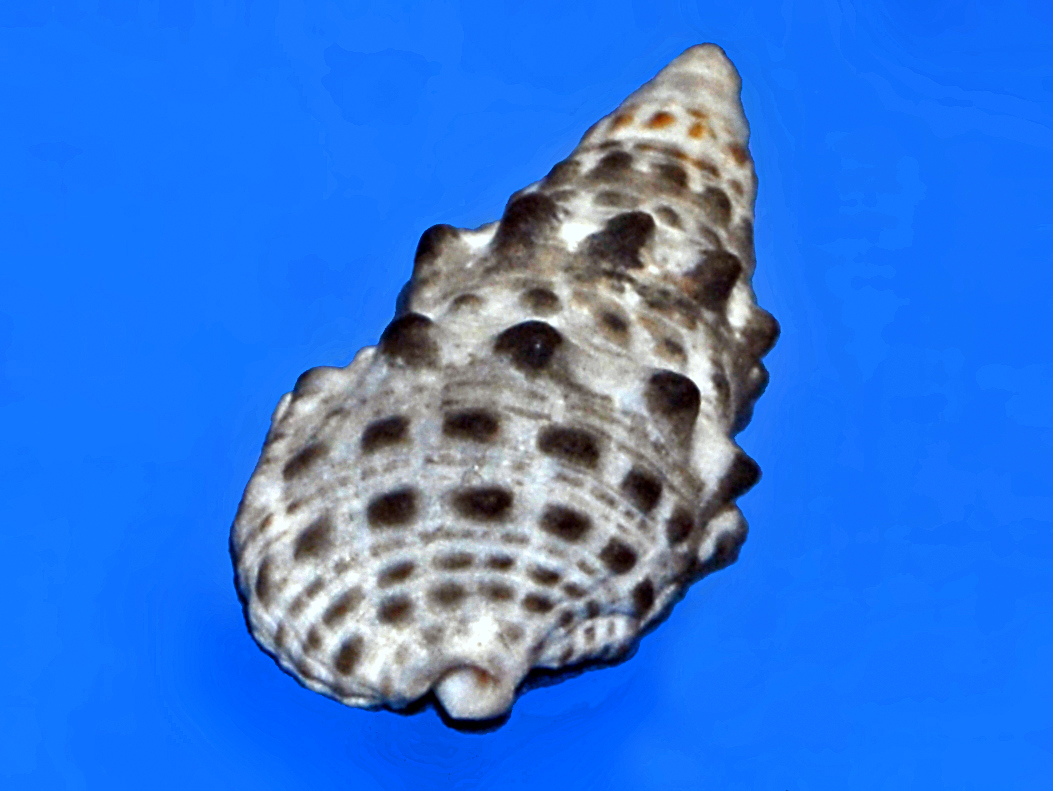
Shell of Cerithium caeruleum from Tanzania

This species is widespread in the tropical Indo-Pacific (Red Sea, Kenya, Madagascar, Mozambique, Tanzania and Western India). The shell of Cerithium caeruleum is large, solid, stocky, knobby, reaching 41.5 mm length and 19.2 mm width, and comprising 8–12 angulate, nodulose whorls. Early teleoconch whorls sculptured with 2 or 3 spiral cords, numerous fine spiral lirae, and weak axial ribs. Adult teleoconch whorls angulate, sculptured with numerous spiral lirae separated by incised spiral lines, fine, colabral axial lines, and with two dominant spiral cords— small, beaded, belt-like, subsutural cord, and very large, nodulose, median cord. A median spiral cord of penultimate whorl has 8-12 large nodes and a wide sutural ramp. Nodes are sometimes spiny and axially drawn out. The suture is slightly impressed. Body whorl large, wide, elongate, with weak siphonal constriction. Body whorl microsculpture same as on adult whorls, but with 4 or 5 major nodulose, beaded, or nearly smooth, spiral cords. The aperture is ovate, a little more than one-third the shell length. Columella concave with moderate thick callus. Anterior siphonal canal is short and strongly reflected left of shell axis. Anal canal is deep and folded into weak inner denticles. Shell color grayish-blue flecked with white; nodes black, early whorls white.

=== 2. Radula ===
Radular ribbon is robust, long, about one-fifth the shell length. Rachidian tooth is squarish; basal plate is with pair of posterior lunule-shaped ridges and weak, central, posterior projection. Cutting edge of rachidian has large, triangular, pointed main cusp, flanked on either side by two, sometimes three, blunt, very small denticles. The Lateral tooth has basal plate and large central ridge with pustule on central-basal portion of ridge and long, narrow outer posterior extension. Cutting edge of lateral tooth with large triangular major cusp, one inner flanking denticle and 2 or 3 outer flanking denticles. Marginal teeth is with wide shafts, narrow bases, and curved, hooked, blade-like apices bearing long pointed tips. Inner marginal tooth with 2 or 3 inner flanking denticles and 1 or 2 outer, flanking denticles; outer marginal tooth same, but lacking outer flanking denticles.

=== 3. Similar species ===
The overall shape and sculpture of C. caeruleum are much like those seen in members of the genus Clypeomorus Jousseaume, and several authors have assigned this species to Clypeomorus, but the resemblance is superficial, as pointed out earlier in this monograph. Cerithium caeruleum is generally much larger than most Clypeomorus species. In size and overall morphology, it most closely resembles the sympatric species, Clypeomorus petrosa gennesi, which is also an intertidal, hard-substrate species. However, Cerithium caeruleum is larger, less pupiform, lacks the whorl sculpture of three tightly beaded spiral cords, and is distinctly more angulate in outline than Clypeomorus petrosa gennesi. There are also significant differences in the radulae of these two species. There is a remarkable convergence in shell morphology between Cerithium caeruleum and the batallariid, Batillaria sordidia (family Potamididae). The overall color and shell sculpture of Cerithium caeruleum are very close to those observed in Batillaria sordida.

Intraspecific morphological variation occurs in shell size and strength of sculpture. Due to the harsh intertidal environment, protoconchs are normally eroded, as is much of the shell sculpture. Some morphs are quite knobby while others may be smoother, especially on the body whorl. Immature specimens are fusiform with large, wide body whorls and resemble immature specimens of Cerithium echinatum Lamarck.

== Growth and Reproduction ==
The egg capsules of C. caeruleum each have a diameter of 150 mm, and there is an incubation period of 4–5 days prior to hatching. Reproductive studies and growth statistics calculated by Ayal and Safriel provide evidence that this species lives from 90 to 120 days in the plankton and has a seven-year life history.

Examination of the protoconch shows a sinusigeral notch and sculpture indicative of planktotrophy. Hulings (1986) found the sex ratio of males to females in a Gulf of Aqaba population to be 1:6. The major period of reproduction was from April through August. The pale-yellow egg masses are arranged in a continuous linear series of tightly folded strings measuring 4 mm high and 50 mm long, and are deposited on clumps of algae or pebbles. Individual egg capsules, 0.15 mm in diameter, contain a zygote 0.09 mm in diameter and are suspended in a gelatinous matrix. Free swimming veligers hatched within 4 to 6 days following deposition.

Foraging fish are the major predators of juvenile Cerithium caeruleum in the Sinai Red Sea. Taylor and Reid found the muricid, Muricodrupa funiculus, to be the major predator of adult populations in the Sudanese Red Sea. They observed that aggregative feeding by Muricodrupa on adults of C. caeruleum was common, with as many as five predators being involved. Adult prey were attacked through the aperture, while smaller individuals were usually drilled through the spire. Due to the thick outer lip and heavily armored shell, it is unlikely that adults can be eaten by most crabs.

== Ecology ==
This species usually occurs in large populations on intertidal rocky shelfs with a thin covering of sediment and is frequently mentioned in ecological studies. It is common in the upper intertidal zone on beach stones and slabs in the Gulf of Aqaba. Ayal and Safriel found populations with densities as high as 300 per m^{2} along the Sinai coast, while Taylor and Reid recorded densities up to 54 per m^{2} near Port Sudan, Sudan. Chelazzi and Vannini documented its vertical zonation and algal associations on intertidal rocky platforms in southern Somalia. A comprehensive account of the ecology of C. caeruleum occurs in Ayal and Safriel, who studied cerithiid habitats in the Sinai peninsula, Red Sea. They recorded that C. caeruleum lived to the lee of wide platforms in solution basins and tidal pools on surfaces covered with sediment, and was very active during ebbs, but aggregated or burrowed during flows. Cerithium caeruleum occurs along a wide range of environmental gradients and occupies a wide vertical range.

=== Geographic distribution ===
This species is confined to the continental margins of the western Indian Ocean where it is found as far south as Natal and Madagascar. It also occurs on Aldabra Atoll and in the Red Sea and Persian Gulf, extending eastward to the coasts of Pakistan and western India.

== Taxonomy ==
The examination of the lectotype of Cerithium tuberculatum Lamarck, 1822 shows that it is conspecific with Cerithium caeruleum and that Lamarck's name has priority. However, Lamarck's taxon is a secondary homonym of Strombus tuberculatus Linne, 1758. Bruguière (1789:15) subsequently combined Linne's name, tuberculatus, with the genus Cerithium. The next available and valid name is Vertagus schroteri Mörch, 1852, of which the holotype is conspecific with Lamarck's Cerithium tuberculatum and which has the same type locality. The little-known name, schroteri, has never been applied to this species by subsequent authors. Cerithium caeruleum Sowerby, 1855 is the next available name and the one commonly used for this species.
