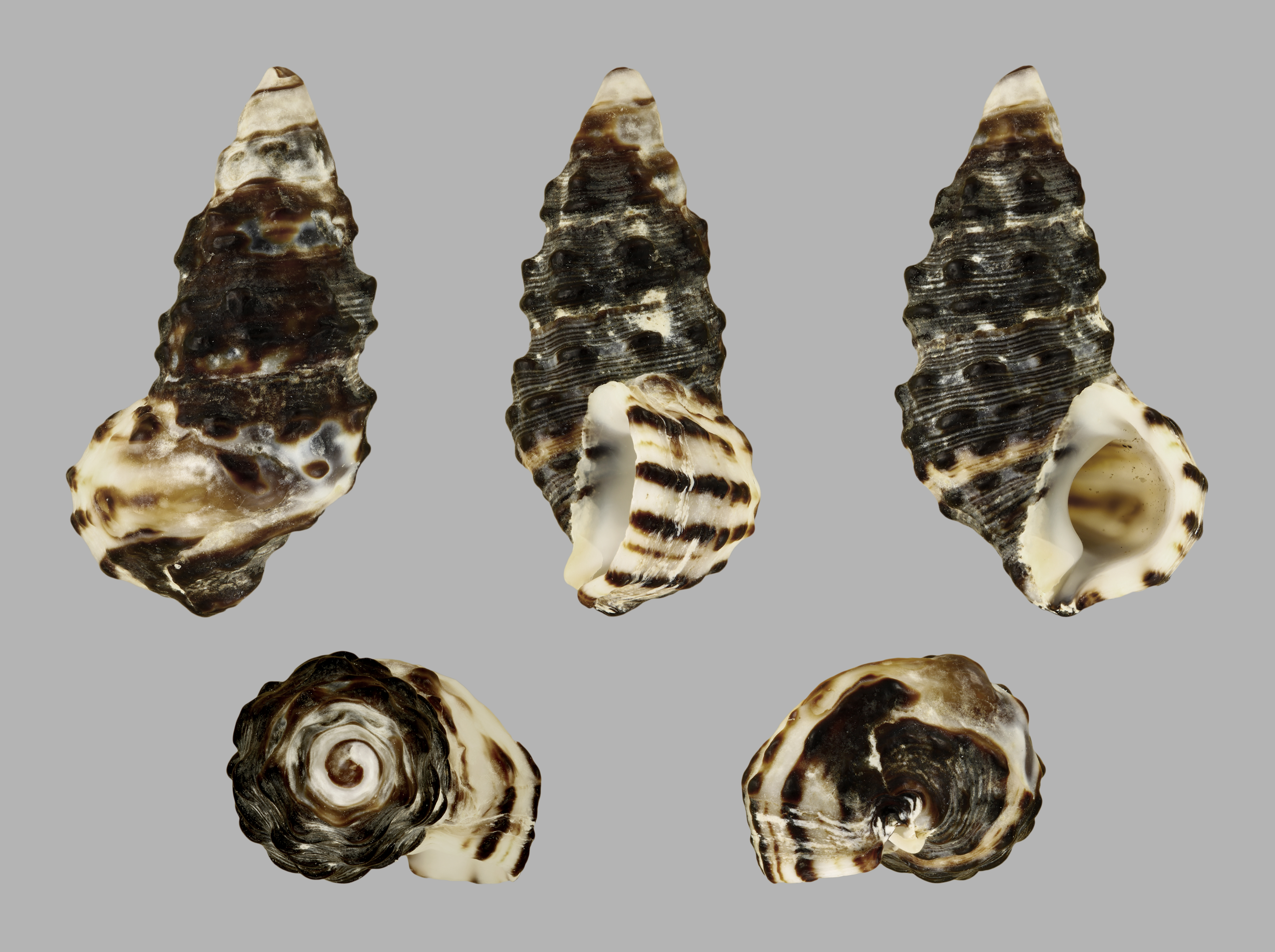

Scientific classification
- Kingdom: Animalia
- Phylum: Mollusca
- Class: Gastropoda
- Subclass: Caenogastropoda
- Order: incertae sedis
- Family: Cerithiidae
- Genus: Clypeomorus
- Species: C. pellucida

Binomial name
- Clypeomorus pellucida (Hombron & Jacquinot, 1852)

Synonyms
- Cerithium echinatiformis K. Martin, 1884; Cerithium gibberosum Frauenfeld, 1867; Cerithium patulum G.B. Sowerby II, 1855; Cerithium patulum var. depauperata Dautzenberg & Fischer, 1905; Cerithium pellucidum Hombron & Jacquinot, 1852

= Clypeomorus pellucida =

Species of gastropod

Clypeomorus pellucida, common name the pellucid clitus, is a species of sea snail, a marine gastropod mollusk in the family Cerithiidae.

== Description ==
The size of the shell varies between 20 mm and 30 mm.

== Distribution ==
This marine species occurs in the Western Pacific from the Nicobar Islands to New Caledonia: off Australia (Queensland).
