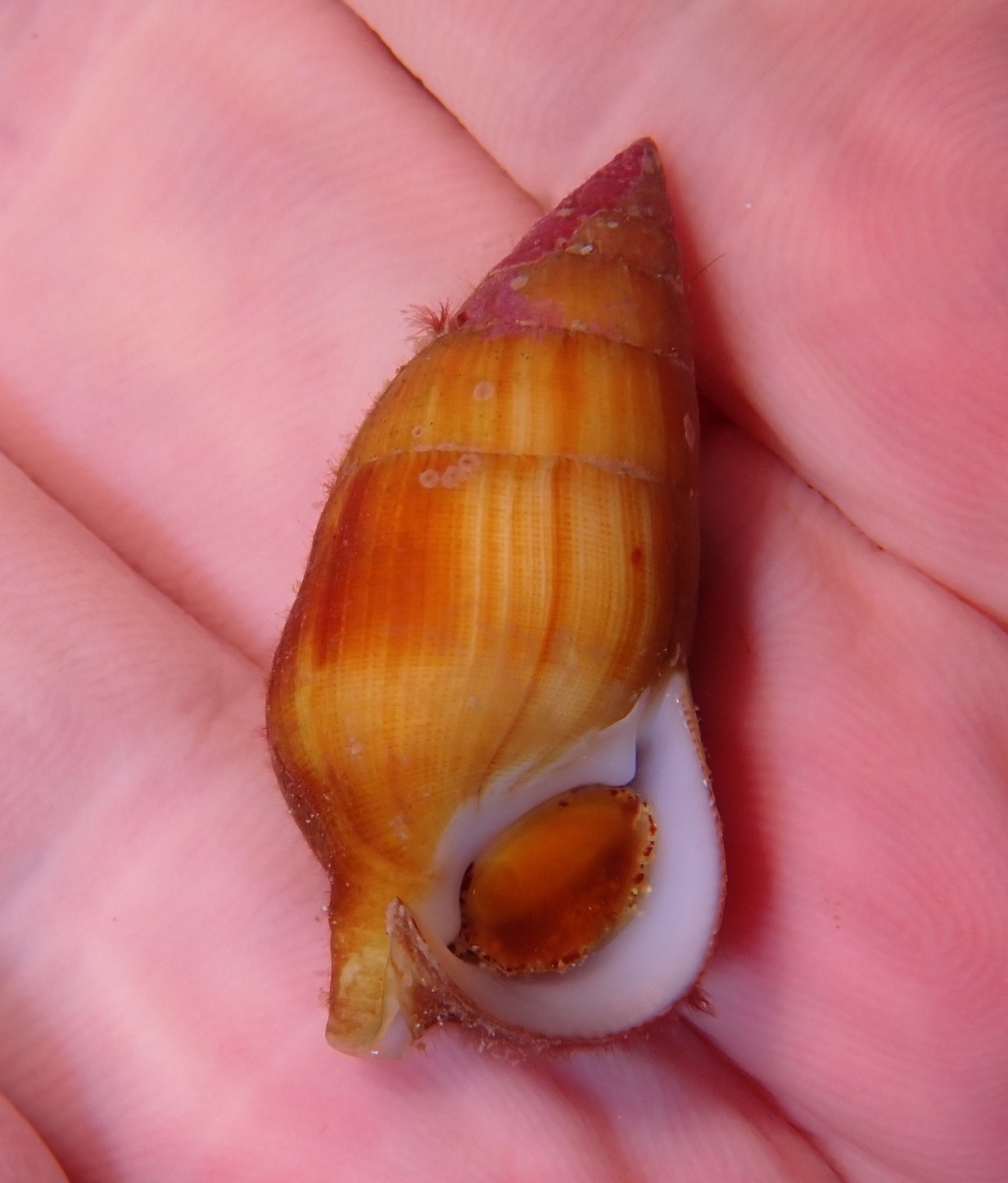

Scientific classification
- Kingdom: Animalia
- Phylum: Mollusca
- Class: Gastropoda
- Subclass: Caenogastropoda
- Order: incertae sedis
- Family: Cerithiidae
- Genus: Gourmya
- Species: G. gourmyi

Binomial name
- Gourmya gourmyi (Crosse, 1861)

Synonyms
- Cerithium gourmyi Crosse, 1861

= Gourmya gourmyi =

Species of gastropod

Gourmya gourmyi, commonly known as gourmya cerith, is a species of sea snail, a marine gastropod mollusk in the family Cerithiidae.

== Description ==
The shell size varies between 30 mm and 75 mm.

== Distribution ==
This species is distributed in the Pacific Ocean along New Caledonia and the New Hebrides.
