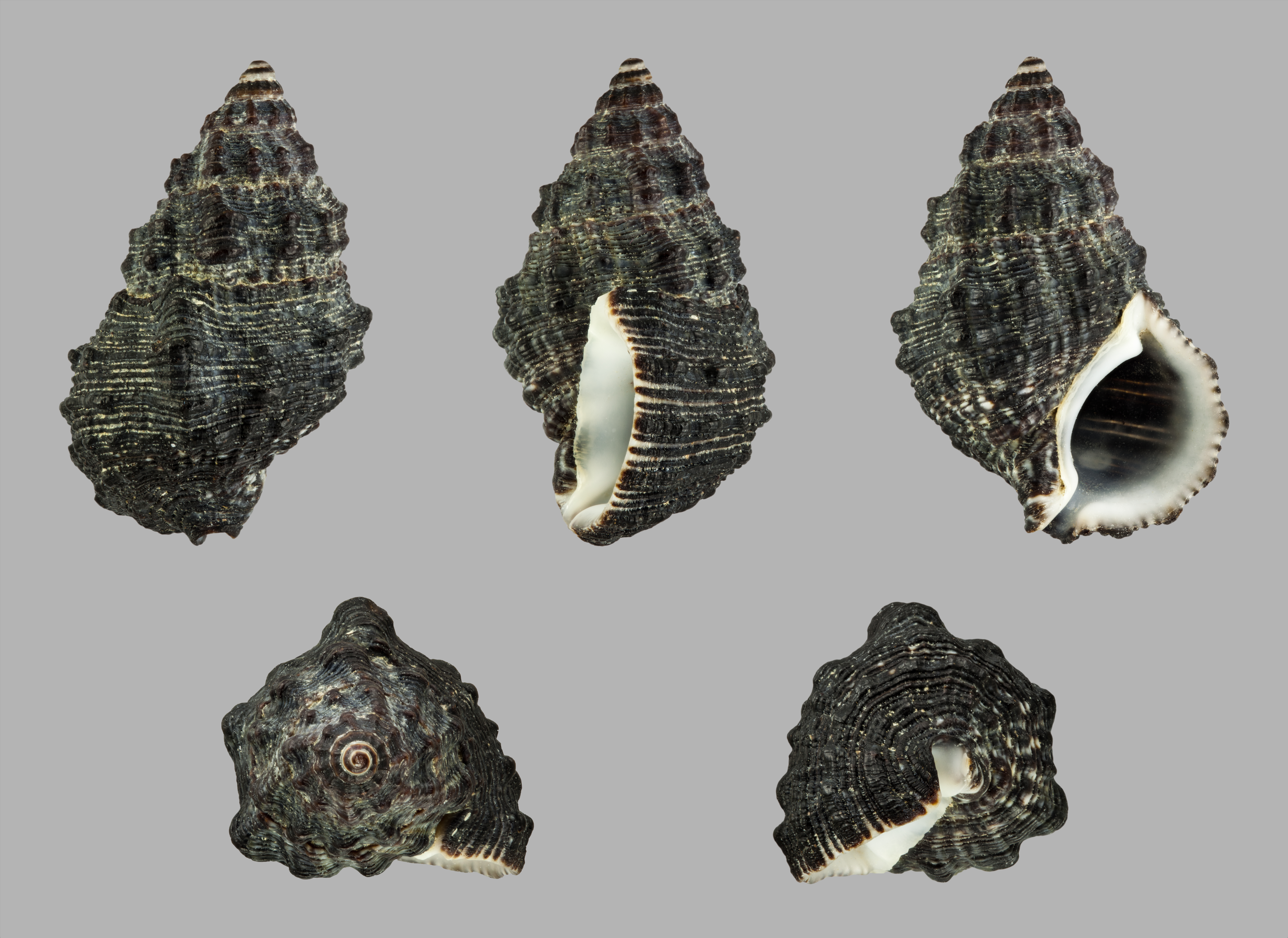

Scientific classification
- Kingdom: Animalia
- Phylum: Mollusca
- Class: Gastropoda
- Subclass: Caenogastropoda
- Order: incertae sedis
- Family: Cerithiidae
- Genus: Clypeomorus
- Species: C. inflata

Binomial name
- Clypeomorus inflata (Quoy & Gaimard, 1834)

Synonyms
- Cerithium inflatum Quoy & Gaimard, 1834

= Clypeomorus inflata =

Species of gastropod

Clypeomorus inflata is a species of sea snail, a marine gastropod mollusk in the family Cerithiidae.
