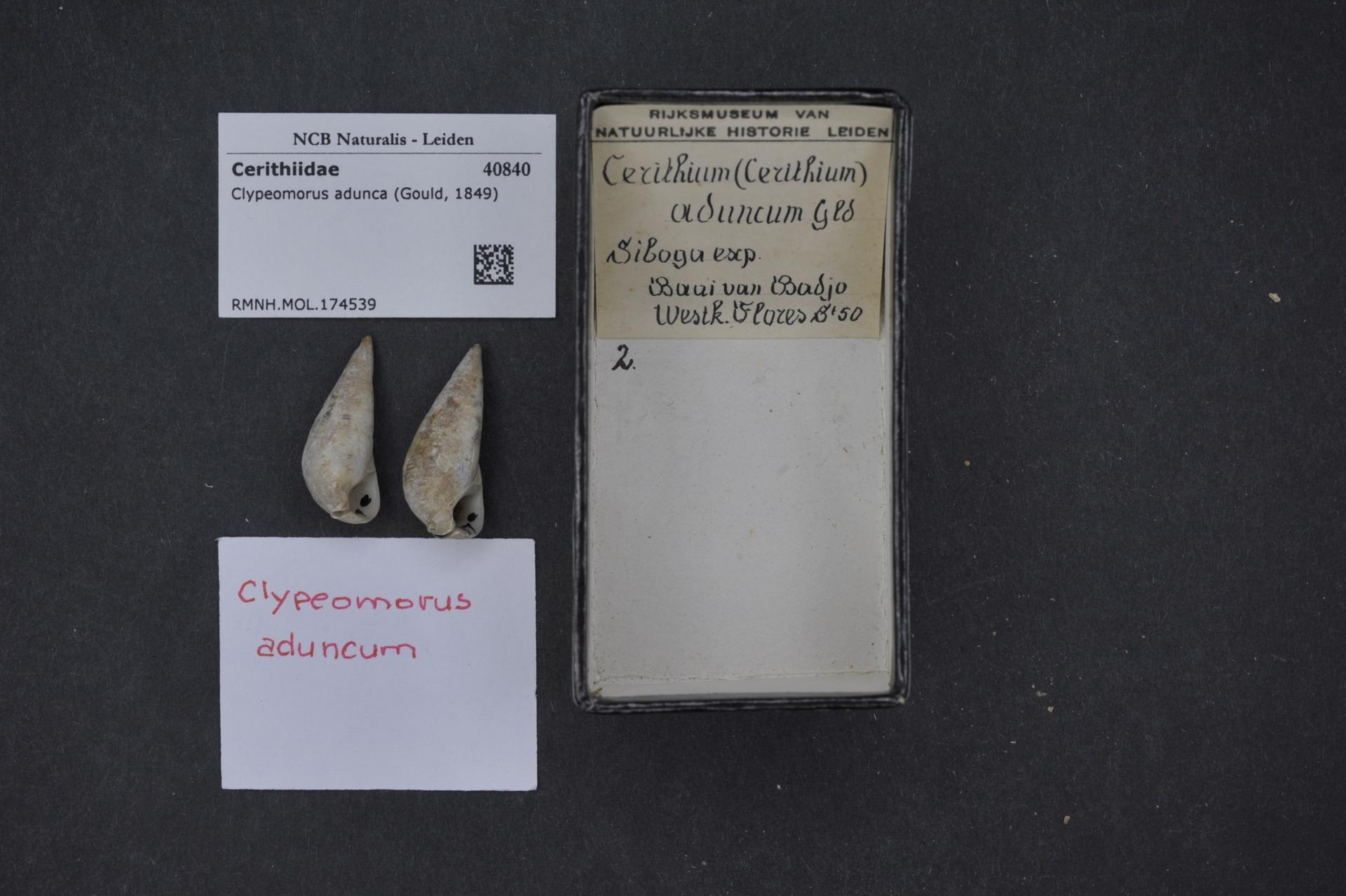
- Clypeomorus adunca

Scientific classification
- Kingdom: Animalia
- Phylum: Mollusca
- Class: Gastropoda
- Subclass: Caenogastropoda
- Order: incertae sedis
- Family: Cerithiidae
- Genus: Clypeomorus
- Species: C. adunca

Binomial name
- Clypeomorus adunca (Gould, 1849)

Synonyms
- Cerithium aduncum Gould, 1849; Cerithium dorsuosum A. Adams, 1855

= Clypeomorus adunca =

Species of gastropod

Clypeomorus adunca, or C. adunca is a species of sea snail, a marine gastropod mollusk in the family Cerithiidae. It is native to the Benthic zone of Western Central Pacific Ocean and the tropics of the Philippines. C adunca was first identified under a taxon by Augustus Addison Gould in 1849.
