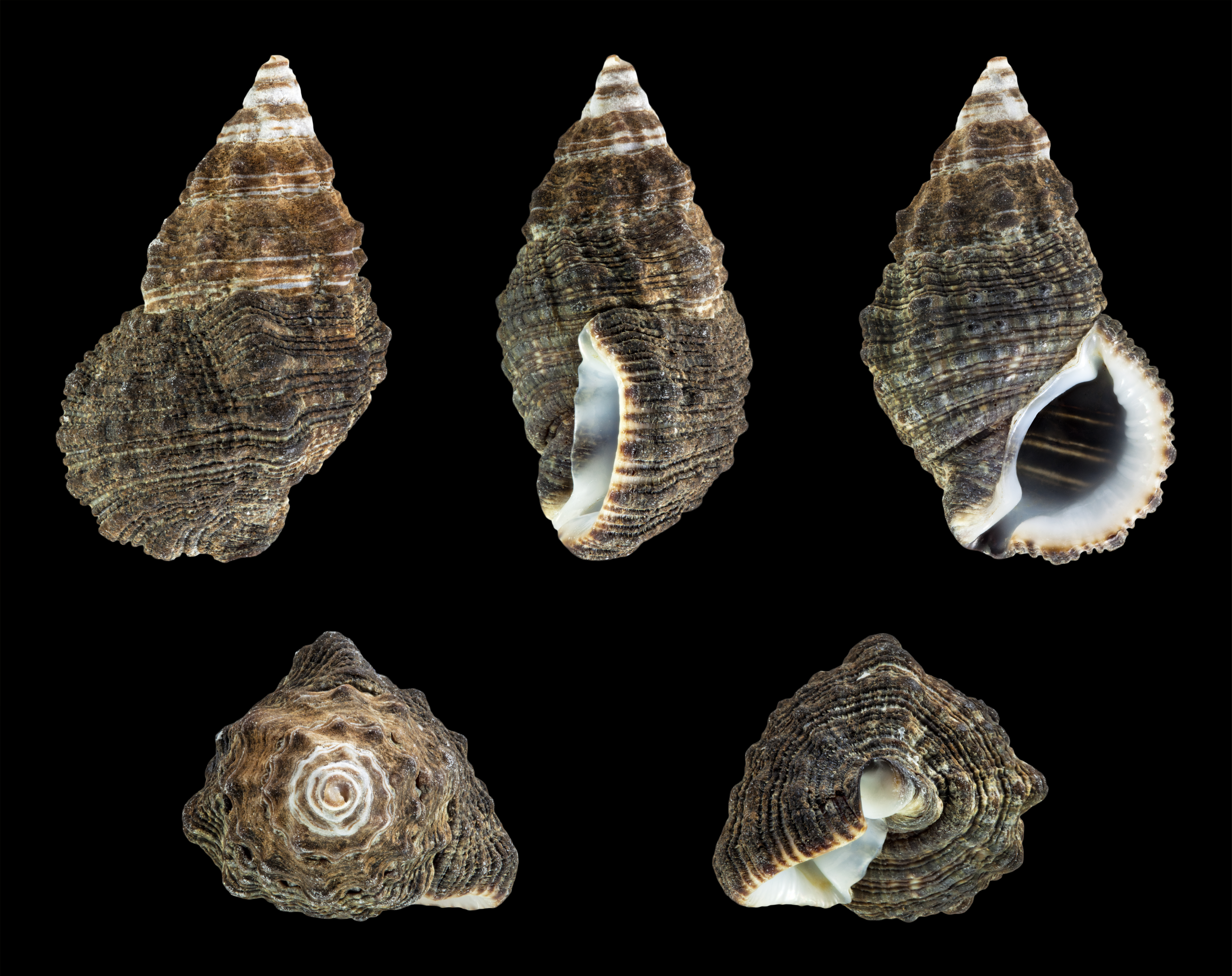

Scientific classification
- Kingdom: Animalia
- Phylum: Mollusca
- Class: Gastropoda
- Subclass: Caenogastropoda
- Order: incertae sedis
- Family: Cerithiidae
- Genus: Clypeomorus
- Species: C. subbrevicula

Binomial name
- Clypeomorus subbrevicula (Oöstingh, 1925)

Synonyms
- Cerithium breviculum G.B. Sowerby I, 1834; Cerithium subbreviculum Oöstingh, 1925

= Clypeomorus subbrevicula =

Species of gastropod

Clypeomorus subbrevicula is a species of sea snail, a marine gastropod mollusk in the family Cerithiidae.
