= Clypeomorus nympha =

Scientific classification
- Kingdom: Animalia
- Phylum: Mollusca
- Class: Gastropoda
- Subclass: Caenogastropoda
- Order: incertae sedis
- Family: Cerithiidae
- Genus: Clypeomorus
- Species: C. nympha

Binomial name
- Clypeomorus nympha Houbrick, 1985

Synonyms
- Cerithium pupa G.B. Sowerby II, 1865; Cerithium sejunctum Iredale, 1929; Cerithium tuberculatum var. variegatum Quoy & Gaimard, 1834; Cerithium variegatum Quoy & Gaimard, 1834; Cerithium zonale Quoy & Gaimard, 1834

Species of gastropod

Clypeomorus nympha is a species of sea snail, a marine gastropod mollusk in the family Cerithiidae.
