= Clypeomorus admirabilis =

Scientific classification
- Kingdom: Animalia
- Phylum: Mollusca
- Class: Gastropoda
- Subclass: Caenogastropoda
- Order: incertae sedis
- Family: Cerithiidae
- Genus: Clypeomorus
- Species: C. admirabilis

Binomial name
- Clypeomorus admirabilis Houbrick, 1985

Species of gastropod

Clypeomorus admirabilis is a species of sea snail, a marine gastropod mollusk in the family Cerithiidae.

== Description ==
The size of the shell varies between 20 mm and 26 mm.

== Distribution ==
This marine species is endemic to Australia and occurs off the Northern Territory and Western Australia.
