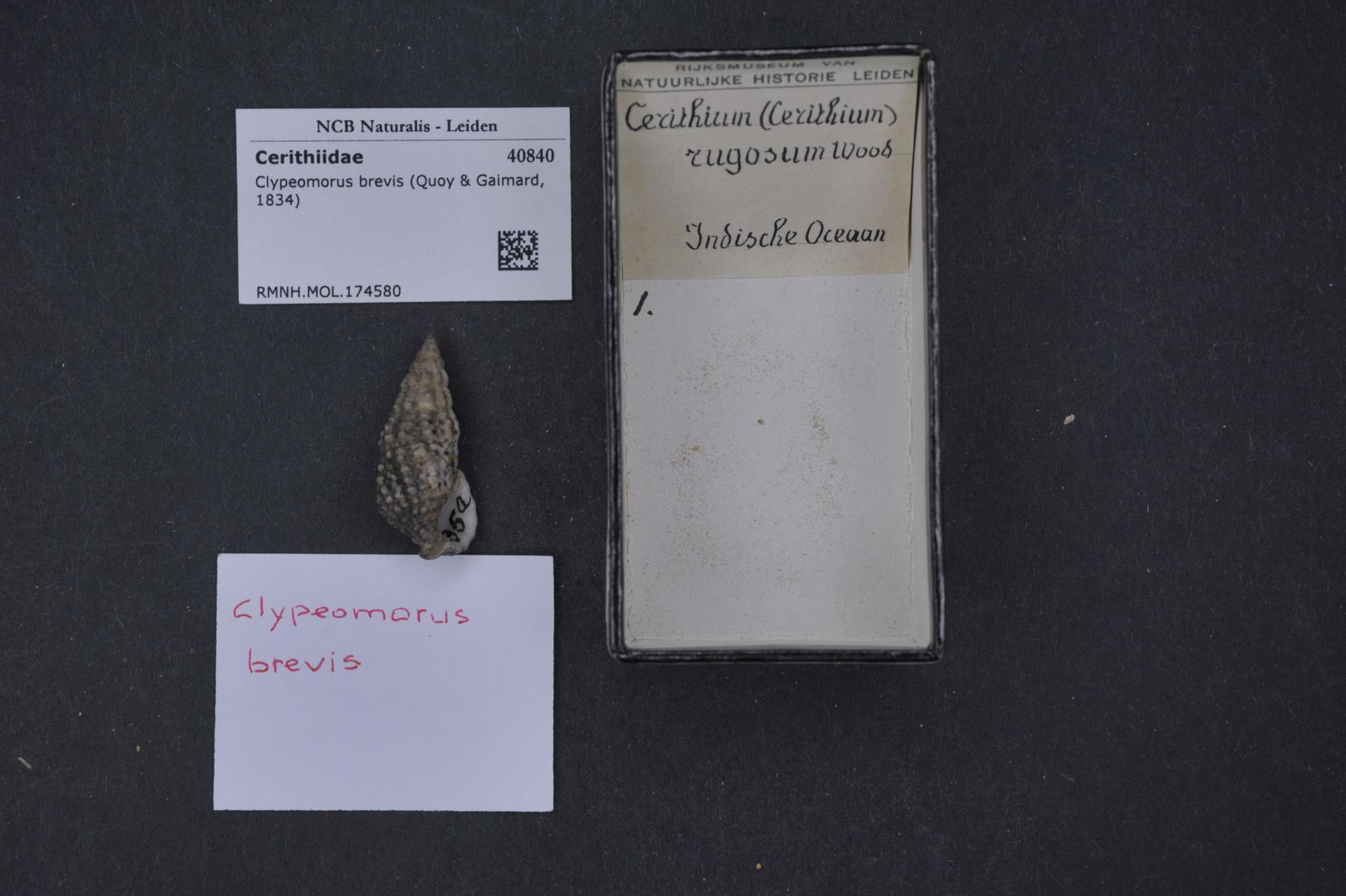
- A shell of Clypeomorus brevis (museum specimen)

Scientific classification
- Kingdom: Animalia
- Phylum: Mollusca
- Class: Gastropoda
- Subclass: Caenogastropoda
- Order: incertae sedis
- Family: Cerithiidae
- Genus: Clypeomorus
- Species: C. brevis

Binomial name
- Clypeomorus brevis (Quoy & Gaimard, 1834)

Synonyms
- Cerithium acutum Hombron & Jacquinot, 1852; Cerithium breve Quoy & Gaimard, 1834; Cerithium breve var. ellicensis Hedley, 1899; Cerithium musiva Hombron & Jacquinot, 1852; Cerithium musiva var. albida Hombron & Jacquinot, 1852; Cerithium patiens Bayle, 1880; Cerithium rugosum (Wood, 1828); Strombus rugosus Wood, 1828

= Clypeomorus brevis =

Species of gastropod

Clypeomorus brevis is a species of sea snail, a marine gastropod mollusk in the family Cerithiidae.
