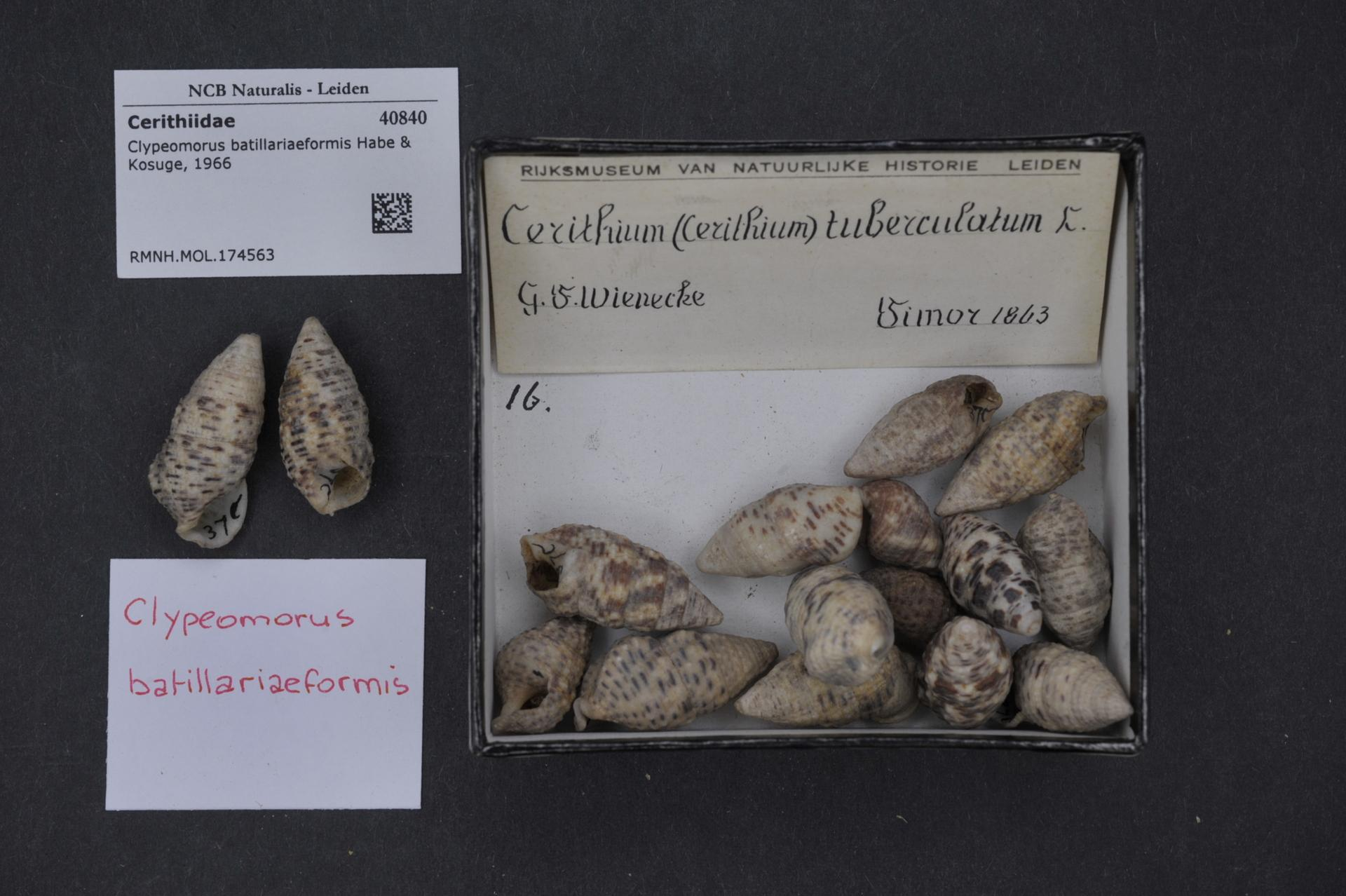
- Diverse shell of Clypeomorus batillariaeformis (museum specimens)

Scientific classification
- Kingdom: Animalia
- Phylum: Mollusca
- Class: Gastropoda
- Subclass: Caenogastropoda
- Order: incertae sedis
- Family: Cerithiidae
- Genus: Clypeomorus
- Species: C. batillariaeformis

Binomial name
- Clypeomorus batillariaeformis Habe & Kosuge, 1966

Synonyms
- Cerithium baccatum Hombron & Jacquinot, 1852; Cerithium gemmulatum Hombron & Jacquinot, 1852; Cerithium moniliferum Kiener, 1841; Cerithium moniliferum concisus (f) Kiener, L.C. in Oostingh, C.H., 1923; Cerithium morus Bruguière, J.G. in Demond, 1957; Cerithium obscurum Hombron & Jacquinot, 1852; Cerithium wainingoli Ladd, 1972; Clypeomorus humilis Dunker, R.W., 1861; Clypeomorus moniliferus (Kiener, 1841)

= Clypeomorus batillariaeformis =

Species of gastropod

Clypeomorus batillariaeformis, common name : the necklace or channeled cerith, is a species of sea snail, a marine gastropod mollusk in the family Cerithiidae.

== Description ==
The spiraled shell can vary between 8 mm and 30 mm in size.

== Distribution ==
The distribution of Cerithium moniliferum includes the Indo-West Pacific. along Japan, the Solomons, the Fiji Islands, Heron Island, Australia, Indonesia and the Philippines; in the Indian Ocean along Madagascar, and the Mascarene Basin and in the Red Sea.

== Life habits ==
These animals form large groups as the tide recedes. Feeding on beach rock at a specific height above average low tide level, the snails slowly move about in clusters, conserving the moisture that allows them to respire out of water.

== Parasites ==
Parasites of Clypeomorus batillariaeformis include Lobatostoma manteri.
