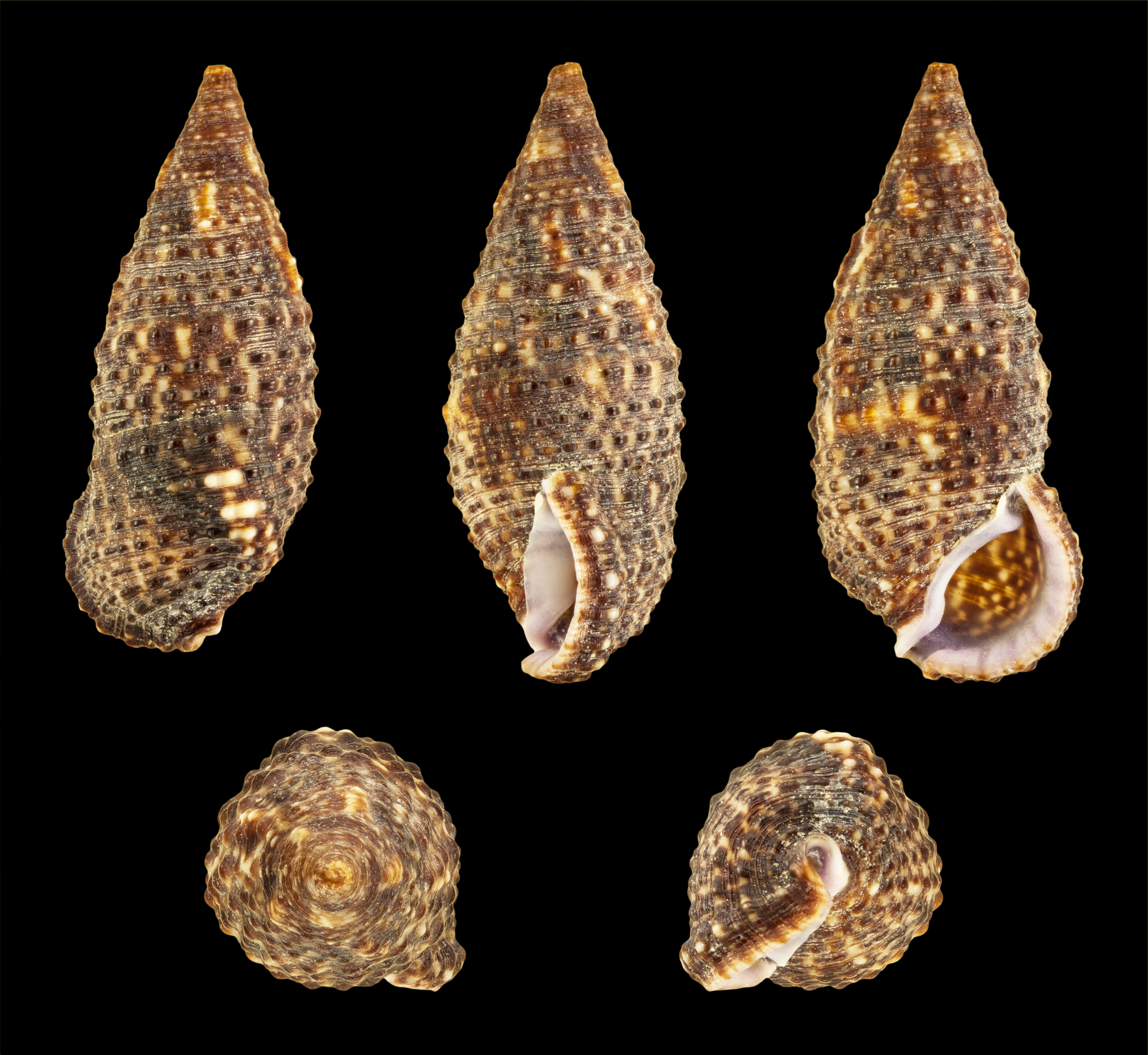

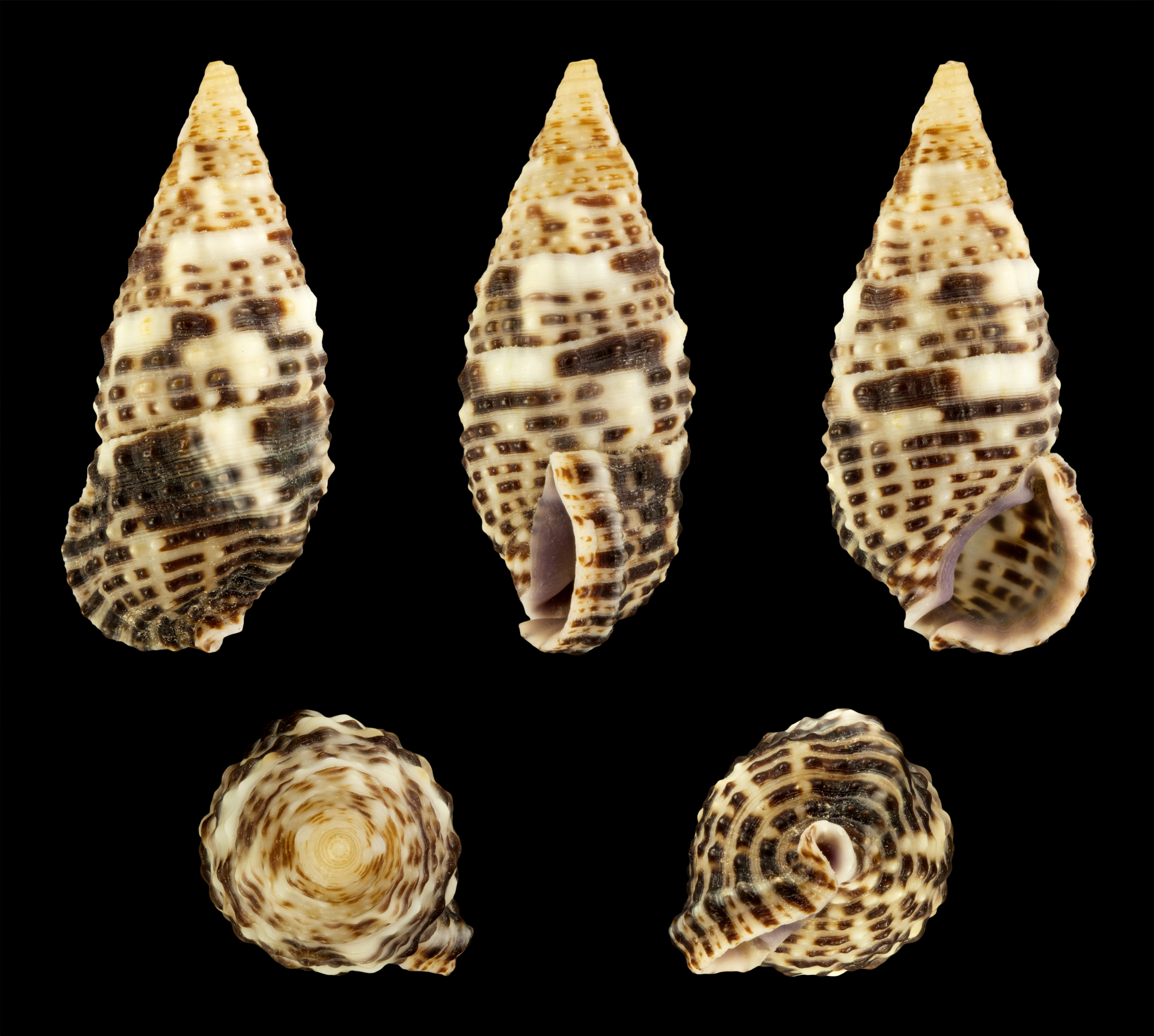

Scientific classification
- Kingdom: Animalia
- Phylum: Mollusca
- Class: Gastropoda
- Subclass: Caenogastropoda
- Order: incertae sedis
- Family: Cerithiidae
- Genus: Clypeomorus
- Species: C. purpurastoma

Binomial name
- Clypeomorus purpurastoma Houbrick, 1985

= Clypeomorus purpurastoma =

Species of gastropod

Clypeomorus purpurastoma is a species of sea snail, a marine gastropod mollusk in the family Cerithiidae.
