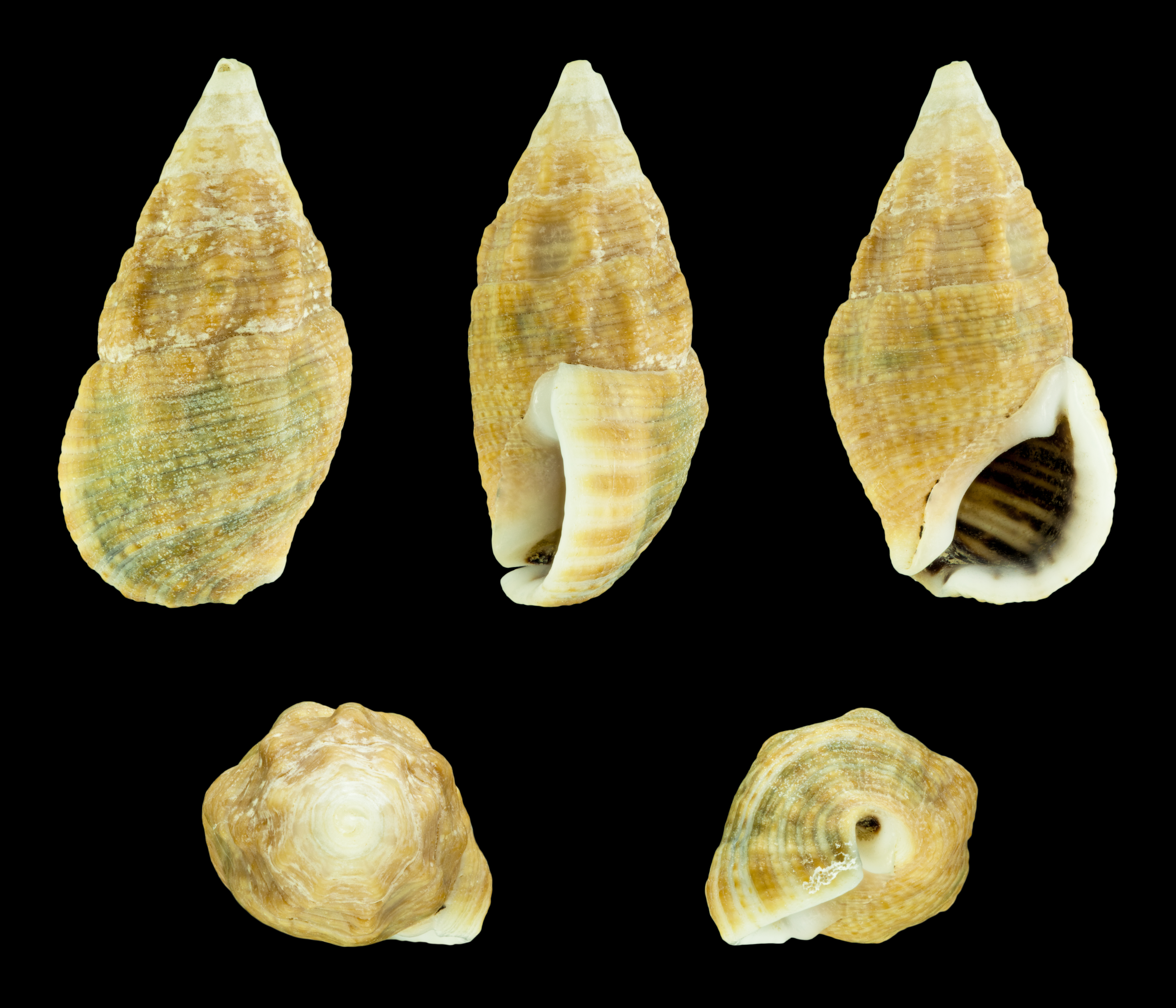

Scientific classification
- Kingdom: Animalia
- Phylum: Mollusca
- Class: Gastropoda
- Subclass: Caenogastropoda
- Order: incertae sedis
- Family: Cerithiidae
- Genus: Clypeomorus
- Species: C. irrorata

Binomial name
- Clypeomorus irrorata (Gould, 1849)

Synonyms
- Cerithium irroratum Gould, 1849; Cerithium obesum G.B. Sowerby II, 1855; Cerithium repletulum Bayle, 1880

= Clypeomorus irrorata =

Species of gastropod

Clypeomorus irrorata is a species of sea snail, a marine gastropod mollusk in the family Cerithiidae.

== Gallery ==
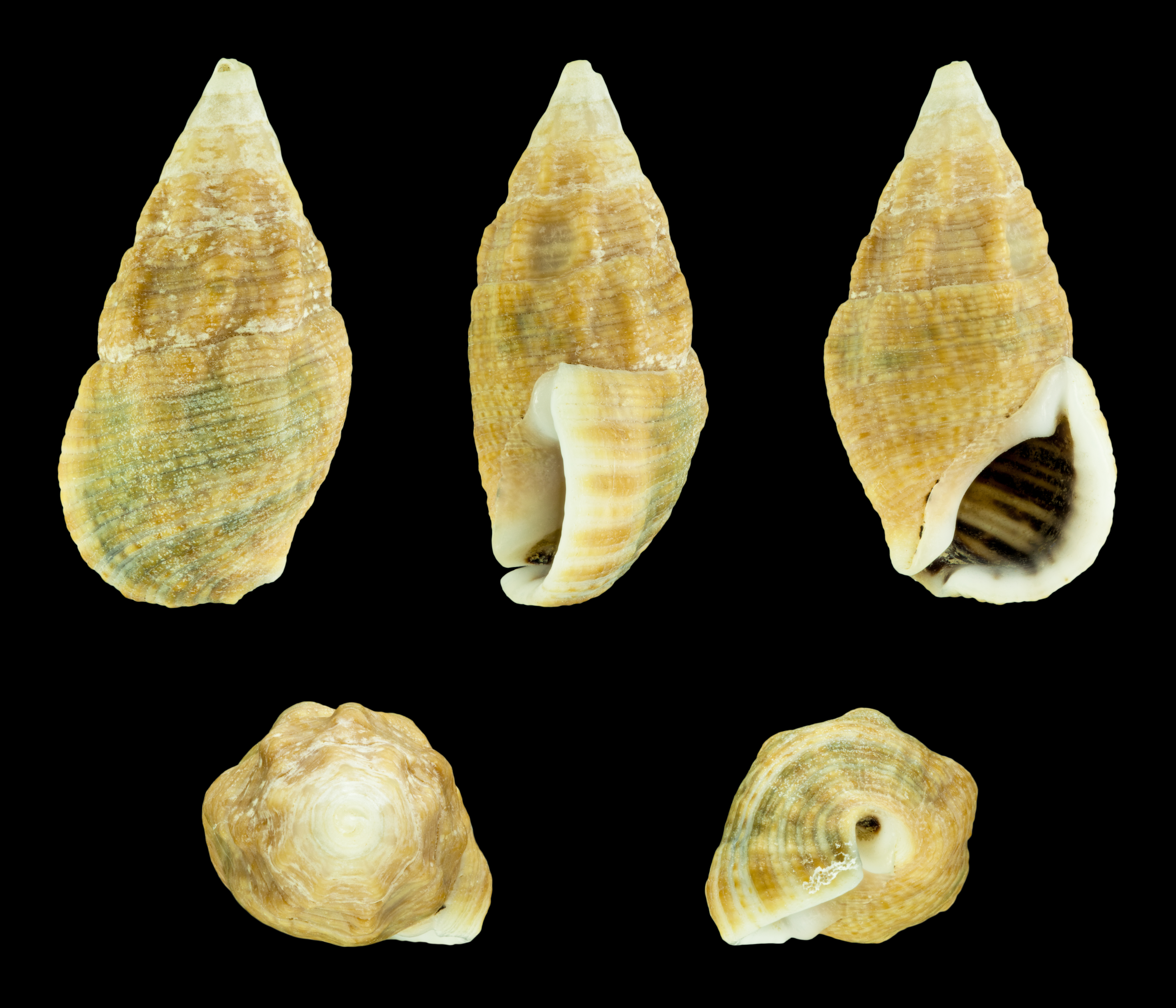
Yellow form

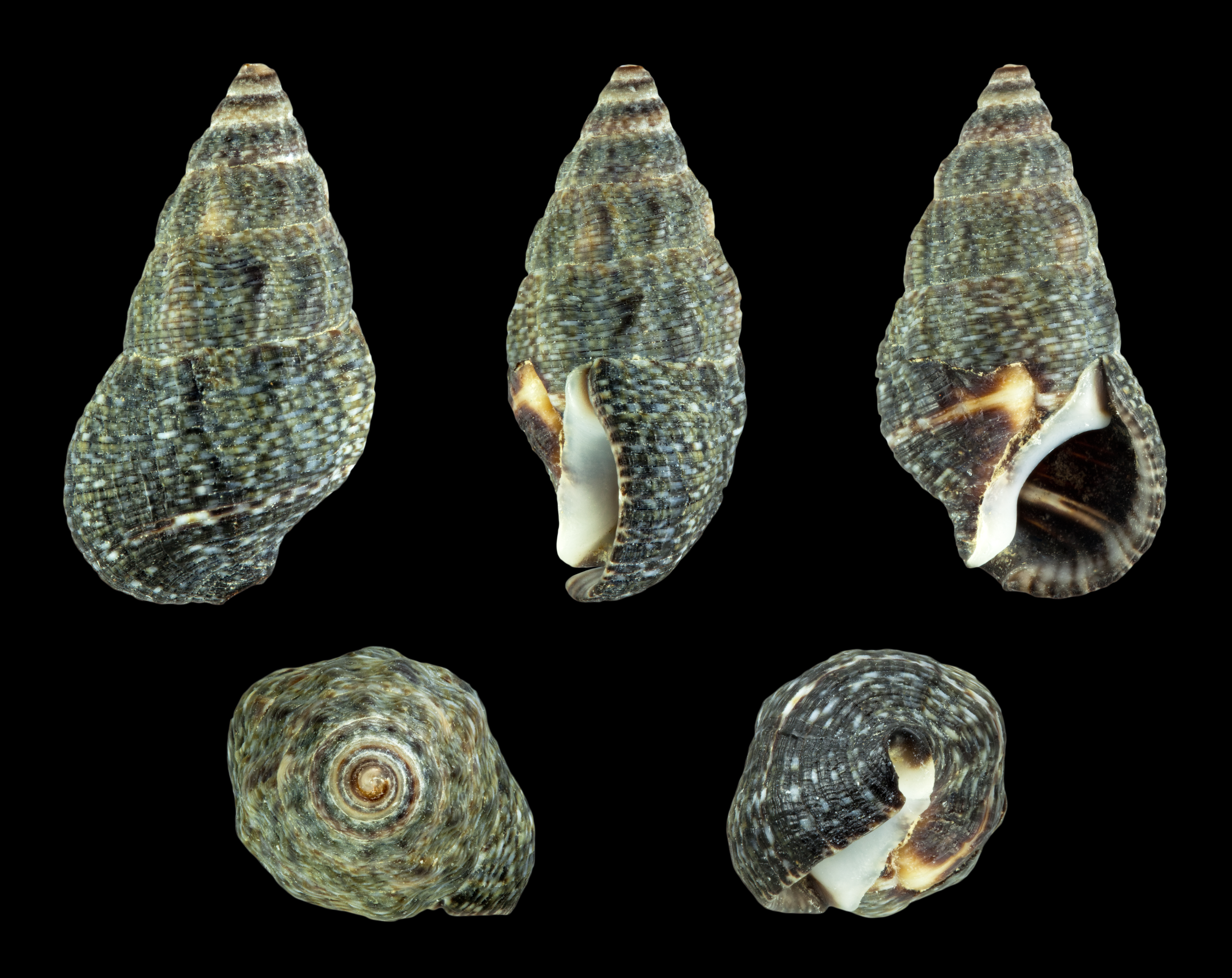
Dark form

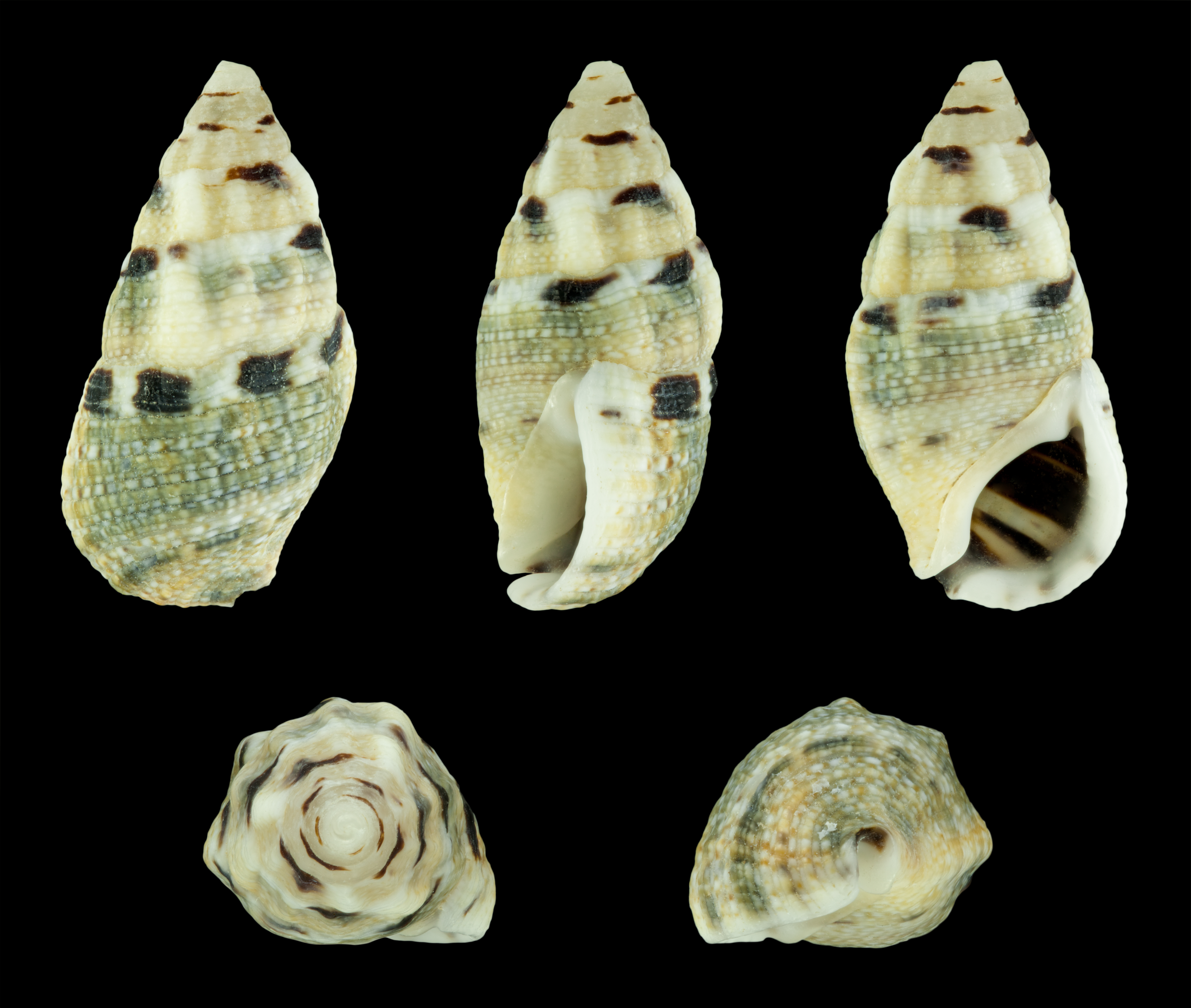
Spotted form
