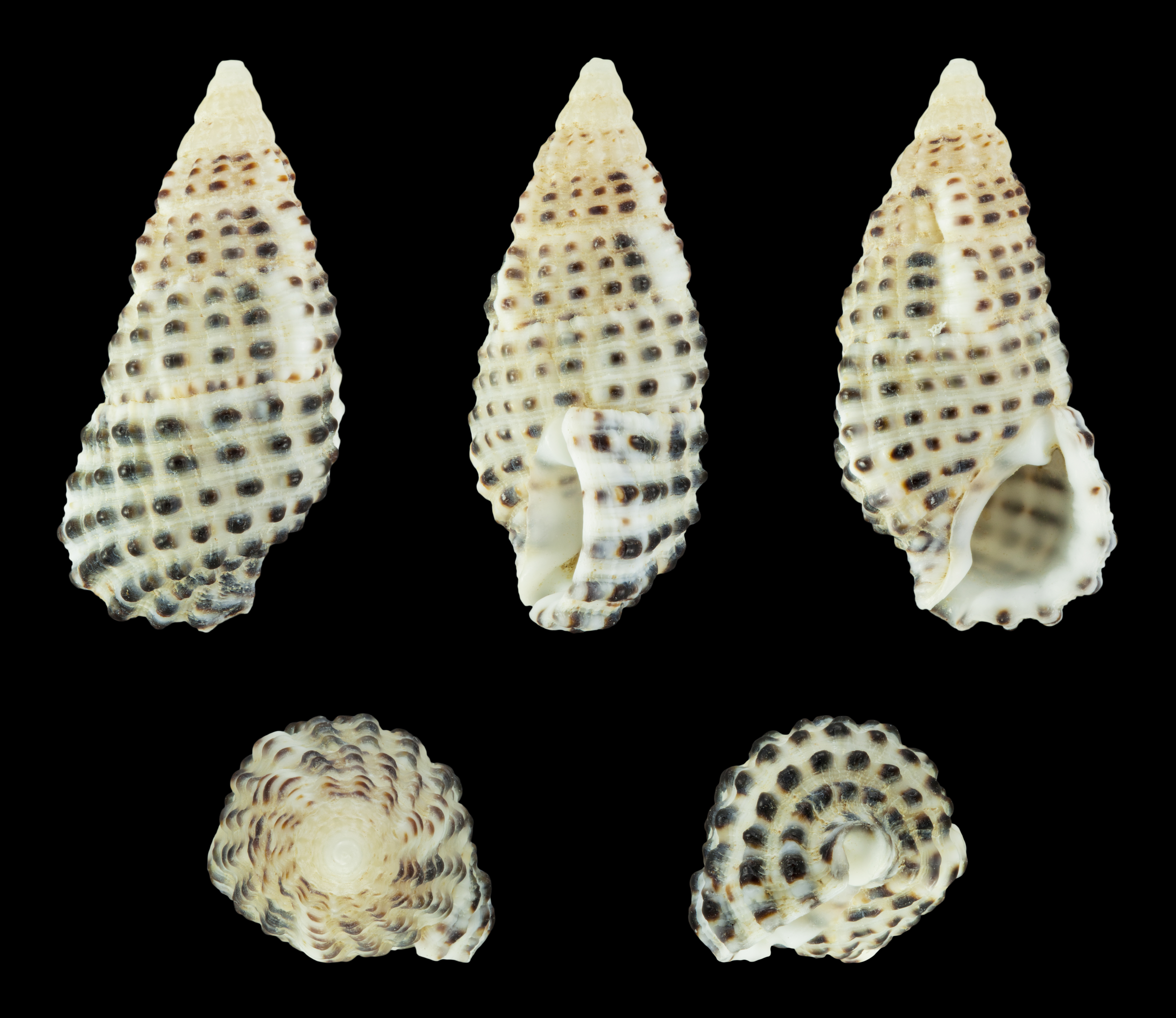
- A shell of Clypeomorus bifasciata
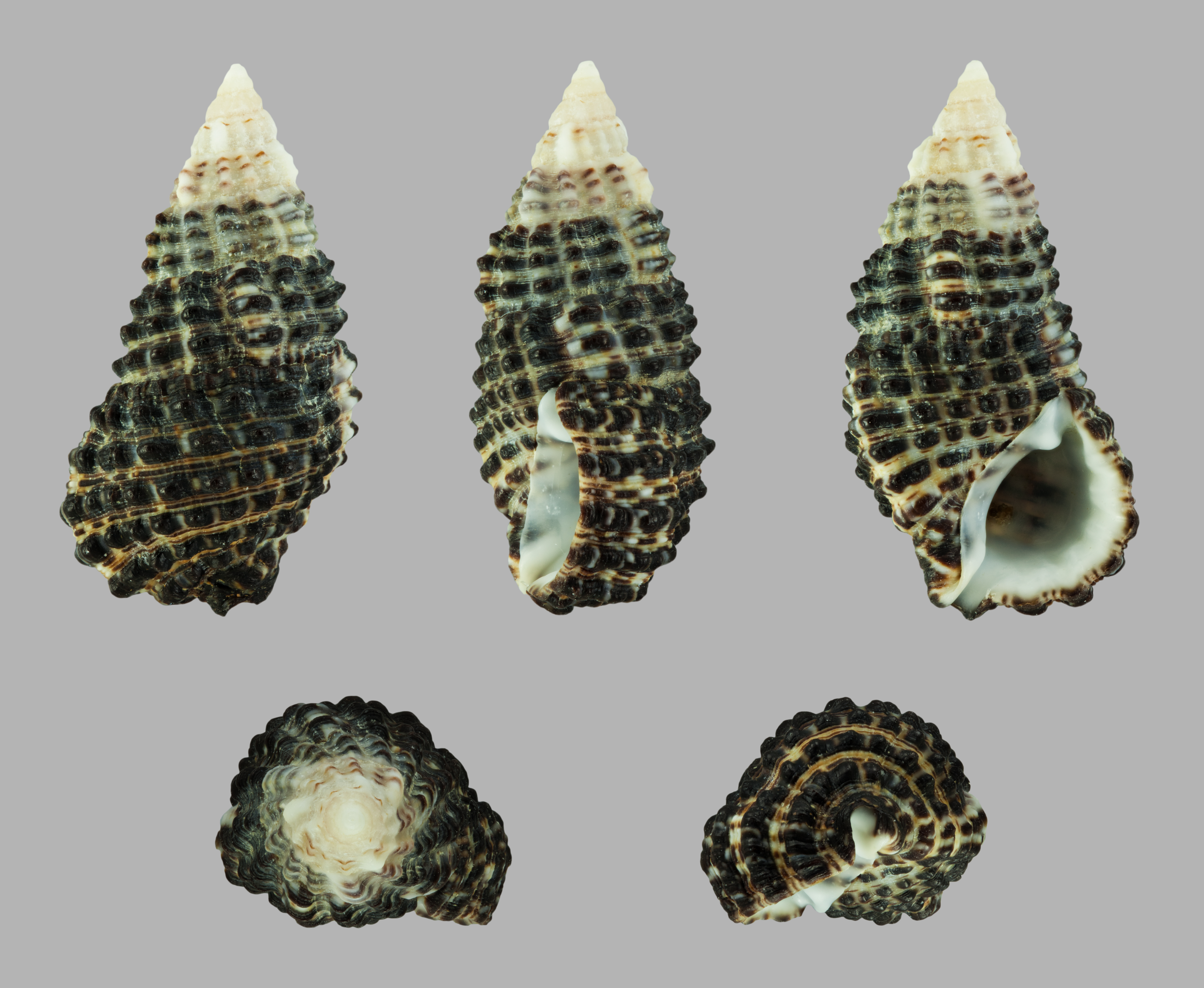

Scientific classification
- Kingdom: Animalia
- Phylum: Mollusca
- Class: Gastropoda
- Subclass: Caenogastropoda
- Order: incertae sedis
- Family: Cerithiidae
- Genus: Clypeomorus
- Species: C. bifasciata

Binomial name
- Clypeomorus bifasciata (G.B. Sowerby II, 1855)

Synonyms
- Cerithium (Pithocerithium) morum Lamarck, 1822; Cerithium bifasciatum G.B. Sowerby II, 1855; Cerithium concisum Hombron & Jacquinot, 1852; Cerithium gemmulatum Hombron & Jacquinot, 1852; Cerithium humile Dunker, 1861; Cerithium morum Lamarck, 1822; Cerithium morus Lamarck, 1822; Cerithium nigrofasciatum G.B. Sowerby II, 1865; Cerithium obesulum G.B. Sowerby II, 1865; Cerithium oceanicum Hedley, 1899; Cerithium rubrolineatum G.B. Sowerby II, 1855; Cerithium uranus Bayle, 1880; Cerithium vittatum G.B. Sowerby II, 1855; Clypeomorus bifasciatus bifasciatus (G.B. Sowerby II, 1855); Clypeomorus clypeomorus Jousseaume, 1888; Clypeomorus concisus (Hombron & Jacquinot, 1852); Clypeomorus morus (Lamarck, 1822); Clypeomorus penthusarus Iredale, 1929

= Clypeomorus bifasciata =

Species of gastropod

Clypeomorus bifasciata is a species of sea snail, a marine gastropod mollusk in the family Cerithiidae.

Subspecies

- Clypeomorus bifasciata bifasciata (G. B. Sowerby II, 1855)
- Clypeomorus bifasciata persica Houbrick, 1985

== Description ==
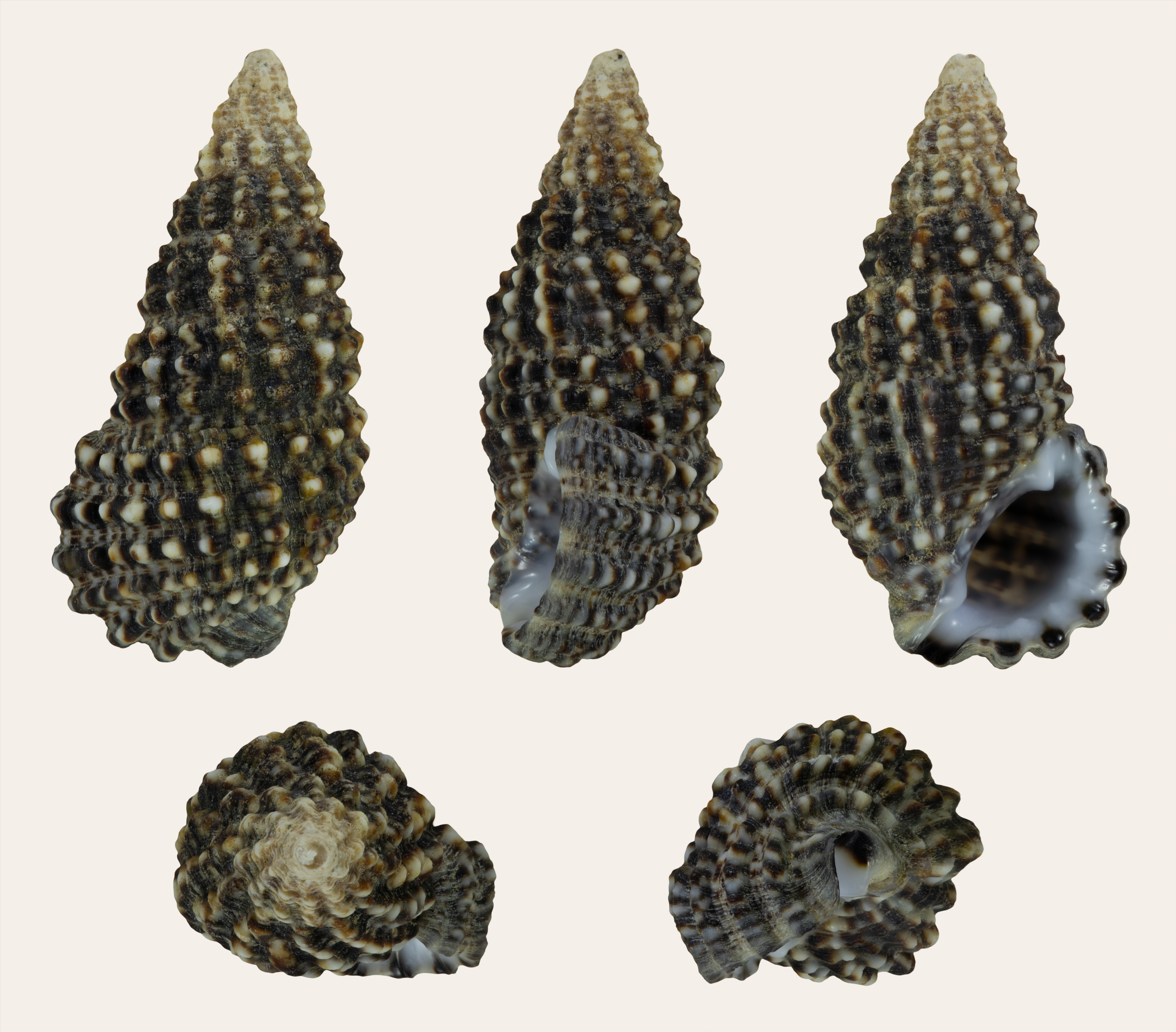
var. humilis

The size of the shell varies between 12 mm and 40 mm.

== Distribution ==
This marine species occurs in the Indo Pacific, from the Red Sea to the Samoa Islands; off Australia (Northern Territory, Queensland and Western Australia).
