= Clypeomorus verbeekii =

Scientific classification
- Kingdom: Animalia
- Phylum: Mollusca
- Class: Gastropoda
- Subclass: Caenogastropoda
- Order: incertae sedis
- Family: Cerithiidae
- Genus: Clypeomorus
- Species: C. verbeekii

Binomial name
- Clypeomorus verbeekii (Woodward, 1880)

Synonyms
- Cerithium (Vulgocerithium) verbeekii (Woodward, 1880); Cerithium verbeekii Woodward, 1880

Species of gastropod

Clypeomorus verbeekii is a species of sea snail, a marine gastropod mollusk in the family Cerithiidae.
