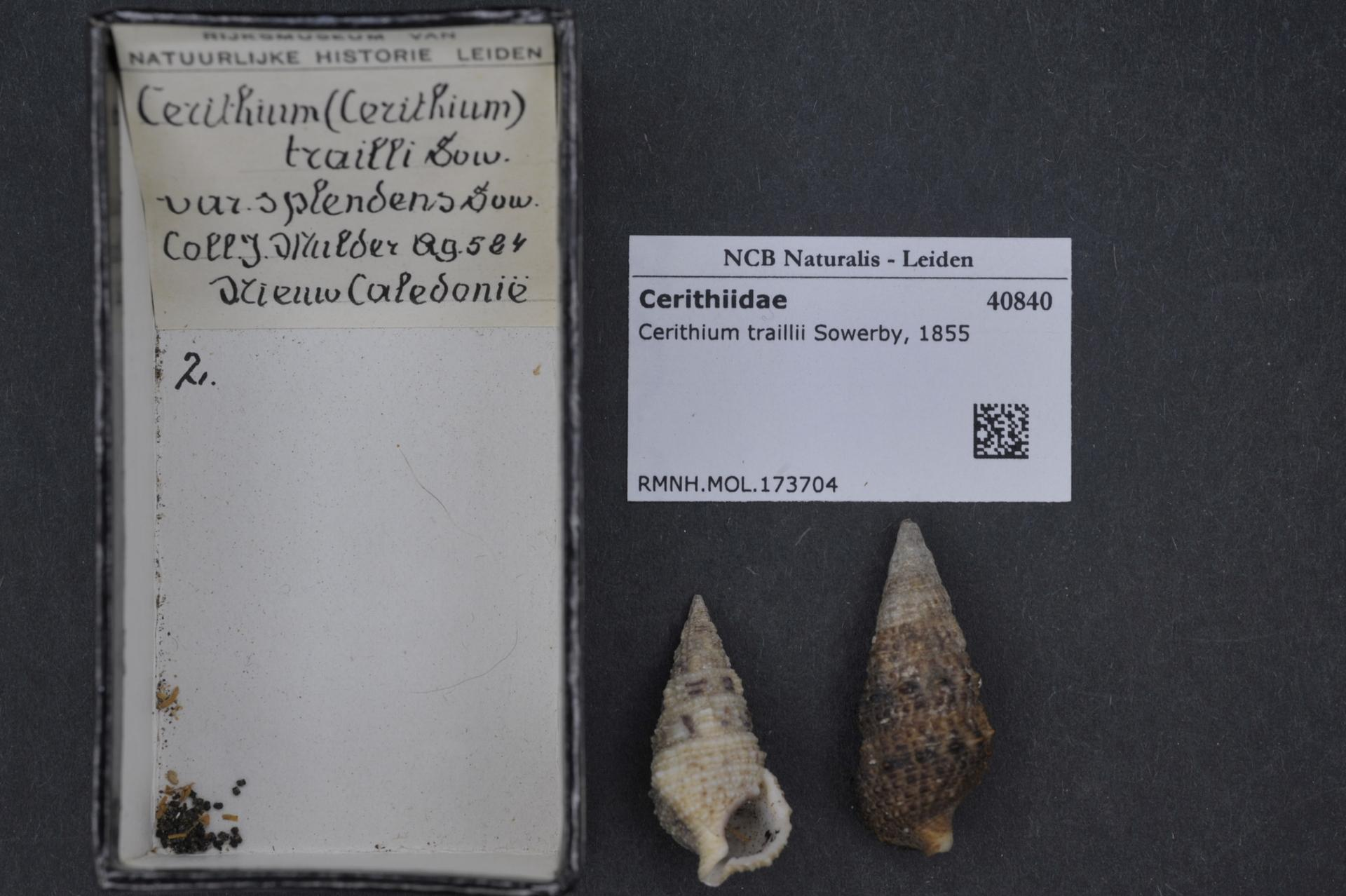

Scientific classification
- Kingdom: Animalia
- Phylum: Mollusca
- Class: Gastropoda
- Subclass: Caenogastropoda
- Order: incertae sedis
- Family: Cerithiidae
- Genus: Cerithium
- Species: C. traillii

Binomial name
- Cerithium traillii G.B. Sowerby II, 1855

Synonyms
- Clypeomorus traillii (G.B. Sowerby II, 1855)

= Cerithium traillii =

Species of gastropod

Cerithium traillii is a species of sea snail, a marine gastropod mollusk in the family Cerithiidae.

== Distribution ==
The distribution of Cerithium traillii includes Indo-Pacific and throughout Southeast Asia.

- Philippines
- Indonesia
- Singapore
