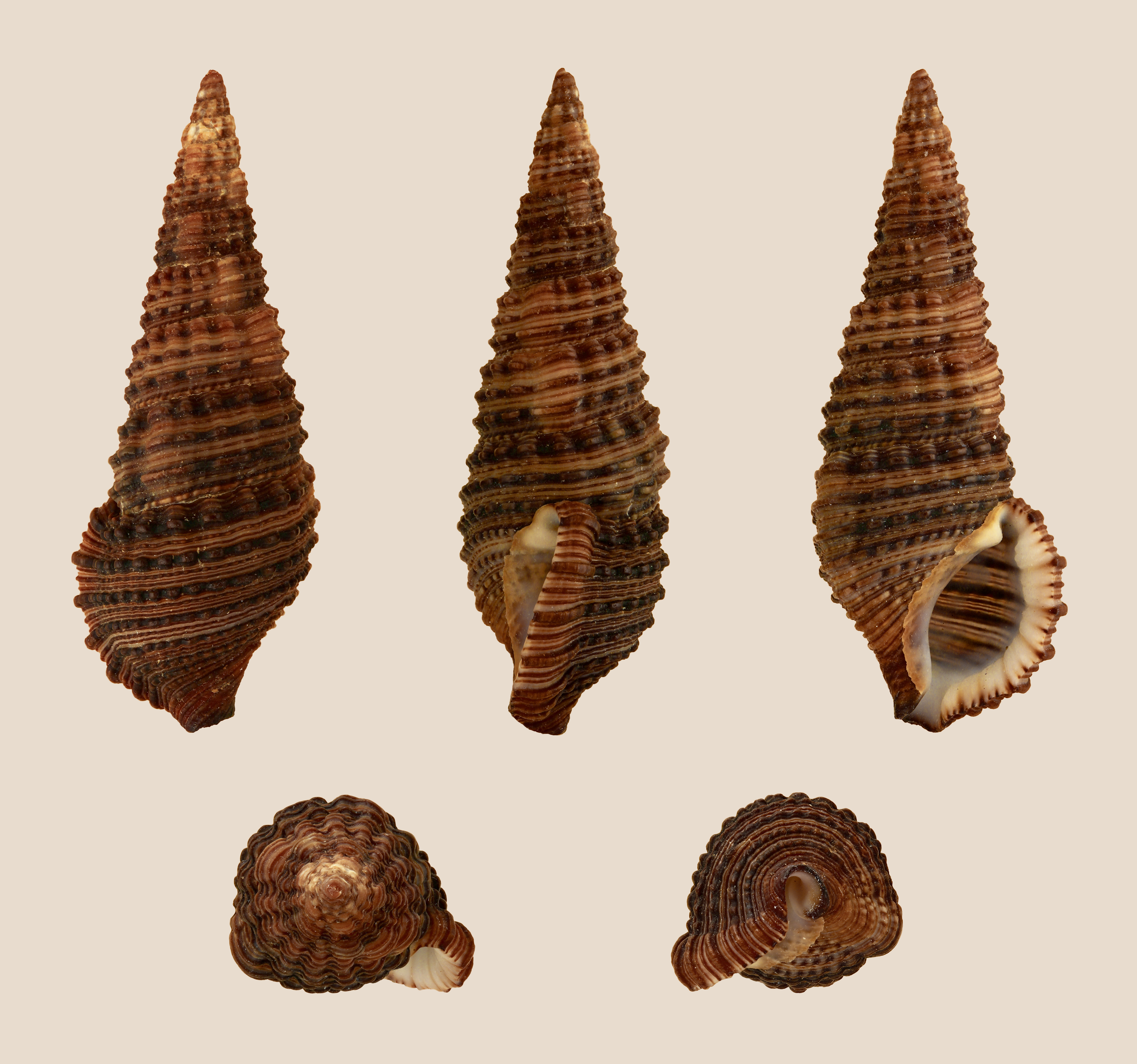
- A shell of Cerithium coralium

Conservation status
- Least Concern (IUCN 3.1)

Scientific classification
- Kingdom: Animalia
- Phylum: Mollusca
- Class: Gastropoda
- Subclass: Caenogastropoda
- Order: incertae sedis
- Family: Cerithiidae
- Genus: Cerithium
- Species: C. coralium

Binomial name
- Cerithium coralium Kiener, 1841

Synonyms
- Cerithium (Thericium) coralium Kiener, 1841; Cerithium duffieldi Iredale, 1929; Cerithium granosum Kiener, 1841; Cerithium ickei Martin, 1914; Cerithium mitraeforme G.B. Sowerby II, 1855; Cerithium nanggulanense Vignal, 1929; Cerithium ustum Hombron & Jacquinot, 1852; Clypeomorus coralium (Kiener, 1841)

= Cerithium coralium =

Species of sea snail

Cerithium coralium is a species of sea snail, a marine gastropod mollusk in the family Cerithiidae.

== Distribution ==
The distribution of Cerithium coralium includes the Indo-West Pacific.

- Philippines
- Indonesia
- Guam
