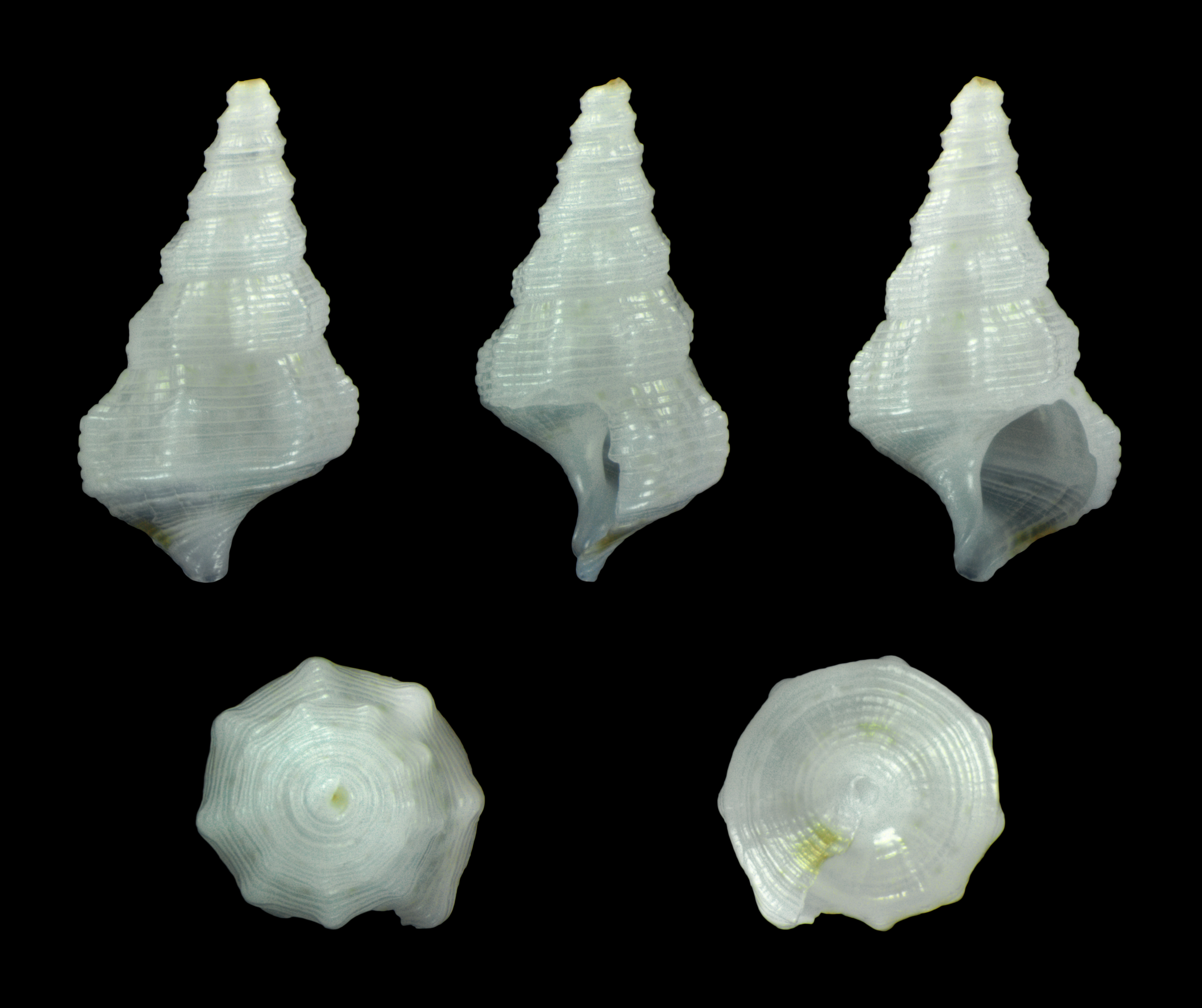
- Juvenile

Scientific classification
- Kingdom: Animalia
- Phylum: Mollusca
- Class: Gastropoda
- Subclass: Caenogastropoda
- Order: incertae sedis
- Family: Cerithiidae
- Genus: Cerithium
- Species: C. protractum

Binomial name
- Cerithium protractum Bivona, 1838

Synonyms
- List: Cerithium elegantulum Coen, 1925; Cerithium haustellum Monterosato, 1903; Cerithium stenodeum Locard, 1886; Cerithium vulgatum var. angustissima Weinkauff, 1868; Cerithium vulgatum var. gracilis R. A. Philippi, 1836; Drillocerithium argutum Monterosato, 1910; Drillocerithium delphinum Monterosato, 1910; Drillocerithium marosticum Monterosato, 1910; Gourmya (Gladiocerithium) argutum (Monterosato, 1910); Gourmya argutum (Monterosato, 1910)

= Cerithium protractum =

Species of gastropod

Cerithium protractum is a species of sea snail, a marine gastropod mollusk in the family Cerithiidae.

== Distribution ==
Cerithium protractum is native to the eastern Mediterranean Basin.
