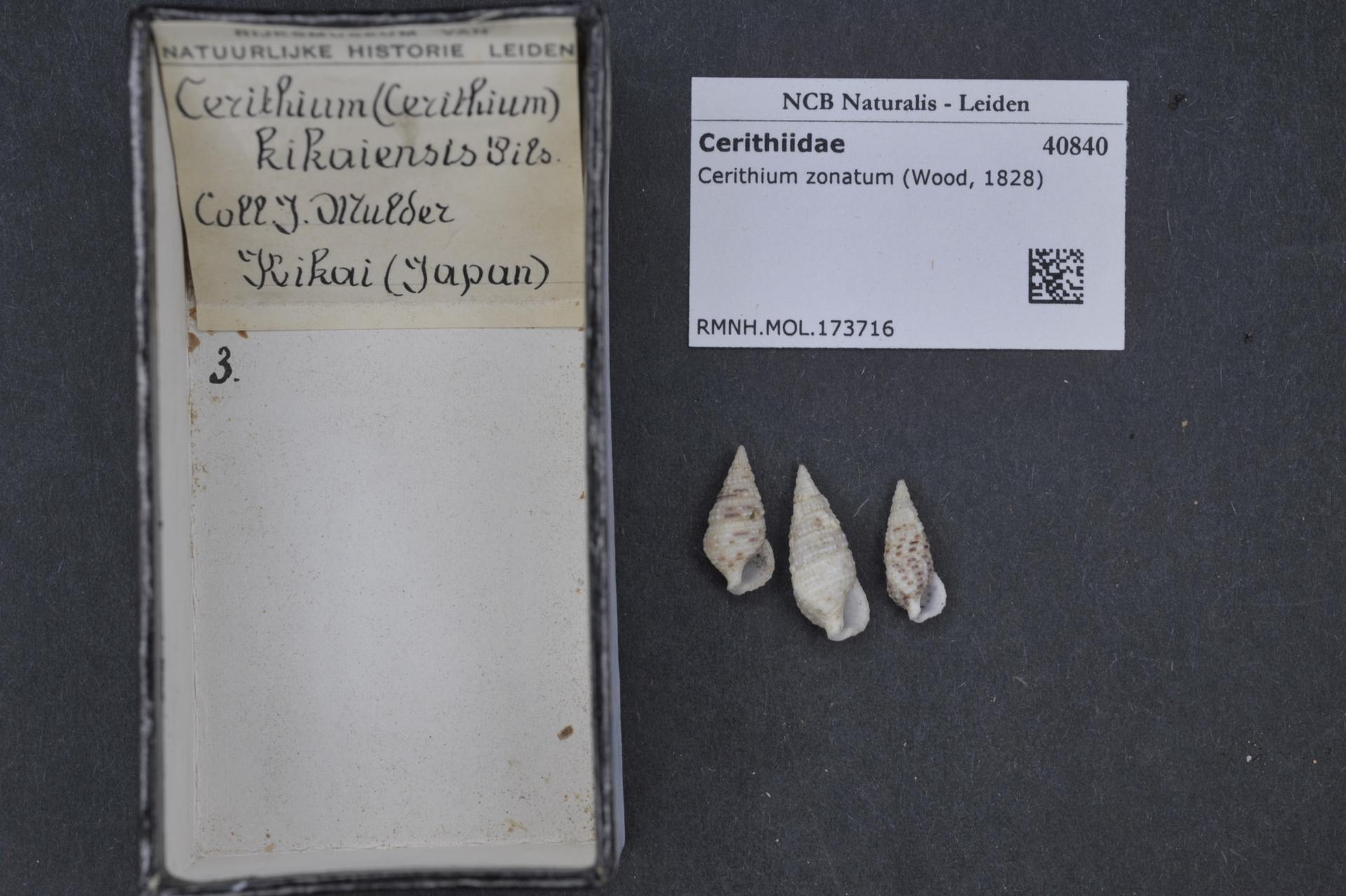

Scientific classification
- Kingdom: Animalia
- Phylum: Mollusca
- Class: Gastropoda
- Subclass: Caenogastropoda
- Order: incertae sedis
- Family: Cerithiidae
- Genus: Cerithium
- Species: C. zonatum

Binomial name
- Cerithium zonatum (Wood, 1828)

Synonyms
- Cerithium alternatum G.B. Sowerby II, 1855; Cerithium asperum Pease, 1861; Cerithium gemma G.B. Sowerby II, 1855; Cerithium gentile Bayle, 1880; Cerithium hanleyi G.B. Sowerby II, 1855; Cerithium lemniscatum Quoy & Gaimard, 1834; Cerithium luctuosum Hombron & Jacquinot, 1852; Cerithium millepunctatum Hombron & Jacquinot, 1852; Cerithium nitidum G.B. Sowerby II, 1855; Cerithium philippinense Cossmann, 1906; Cerithium probleema Iredale, 1929; Cerithium purpurascens G.B. Sowerby II, 1855; Cerithium robustum G.B. Sowerby II, 1865; Cerithium splendens G.B. Sowerby II, 1855; Cerithium tesselatum G.B. Sowerby II, 1855; Cerithium traillii kikaiensis Pilsbry, 1904; Clypeomorus zonatus (Wood, 1828); Strombus zonatus Wood, 1828

= Cerithium zonatum =

Species of gastropod

Cerithium zonatum is a species of sea snail, a marine gastropod mollusk in the family Cerithiidae.

== Distribution ==
The distribution of Cerithium zonatum includes the Western Central Pacific.

- Philippines
- Indonesia
- Guam
