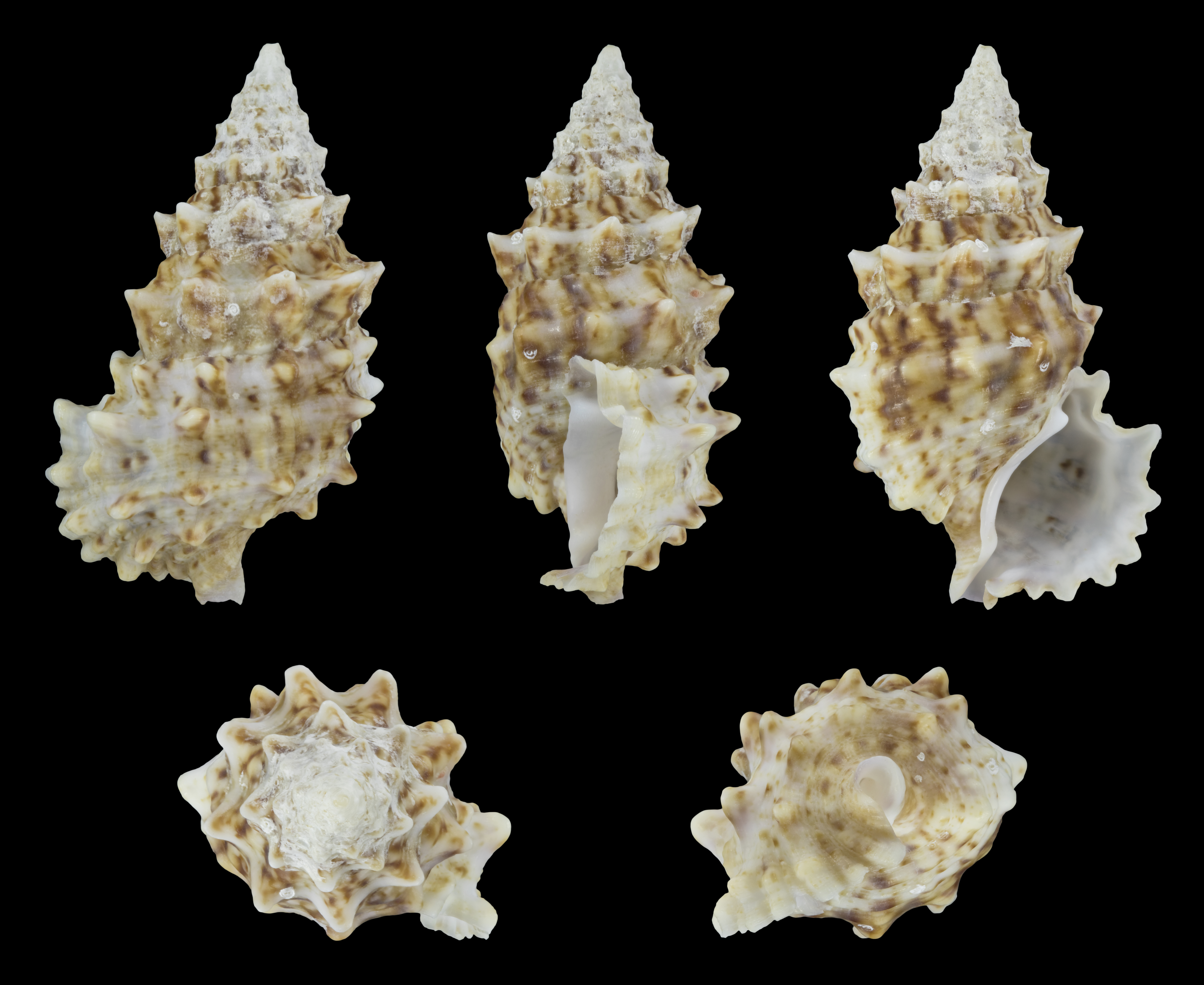
- Five views of a shell of Cerithium echinatum

Scientific classification
- Kingdom: Animalia
- Phylum: Mollusca
- Class: Gastropoda
- Subclass: Caenogastropoda
- Order: incertae sedis
- Family: Cerithiidae
- Genus: Cerithium
- Species: C. echinatum

Binomial name
- Cerithium echinatum Lamarck, 1822

= Cerithium echinatum =

Species of gastropod

Cerithium echinatum is a species of small sea snail, a marine gastropod mollusk in the family Cerithiidae.

== Description ==
This snail's shell has a short siphonal canal. The shell has spiral rows of bumps as well as reddish-brown dashes. It has been found at 53mm in size.

== Distribution ==
The distribution of Cerithium echinatum includes the Indo-Pacific. It is found off the southern African coast at northern KwaZulu-Natal and Mozambique in 15-30m of water.
