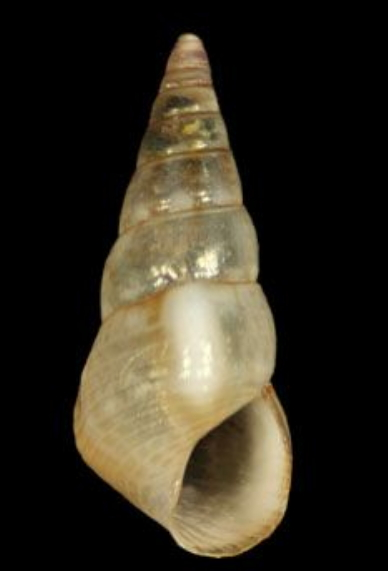
- Shell of Alaba culliereti (specimen in the Natural History Museum Rotterdam)

Scientific classification
- Kingdom: Animalia
- Phylum: Mollusca
- Class: Gastropoda
- Subclass: Caenogastropoda
- Order: incertae sedis
- Family: Litiopidae
- Genus: Alaba; H. Adams & A. Adams, 1853
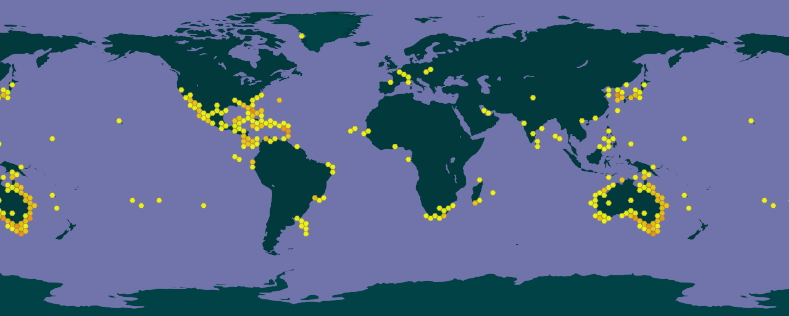

Synonyms
- Australaba Laseron, 1956; Cerithiopsis (Alaba) H. Adams & A. Adams, 1853 (original rank); Litiopa (Alaba) H. Adams & A. Adams, 1853 superseded combination; Pseudobittium Dautzenberg, 1890; Rissoa (Alaba) H. Adams & A. Adams, 1853 · unaccepted > superseded rank

= Alaba (gastropod) =

Genus of gastropods

Alaba is a genus of sea snails, marine gastropod mollusks in the family Litiopidae.

== Description ==
(Original description) The elongated shell is turreted. It is smooth and semi-translucent, with whorls that occasionally feature a few irregular varices. They often have fine axial ribs or striations. The outer lip is thin and simple, while the ovate aperture is slightly emarginate at the anterior end.

== Distribution ==
Alaba is a cosmopolitan genus, but mostly distributed in shallow tropical and subtropical seas in coral reefs, rocky substrates, and seagrass beds.

== Species ==
Species within the genus Alaba include:

- Alaba bowenensis (Laseron, 1956)
- Alaba cornea (A. Adams, 1861)
- Alaba culliereti (Dautzenberg, 1891)
- Alaba diffilata (Laseron, 1956)
- Alaba difformis (Laseron, 1956)
- Alaba felina A. Adams, 1862
- Alaba fragilis (Thiele, 1930)
- Alaba guayaquilensis Bartsch, 1928
- Alaba hartmeyeri (Thiele, 1930)
- Alaba hungerfordi G. B. Sowerby III, 1894
- Alaba imbricata A. Adams, 1862
- Alaba incerta (d'Orbigny, 1841)
- Alaba inflata A. Adams, 1862
- Alaba interrupelineata Pilsbry & Lowe, 1932
- Alaba jeanettae Bartsch, 1910
- Alaba leucosticta (A. Adams, 1861)
- Alaba lixa (Iredale, 1936)
- Alaba lucida A. Adams, 1862
- Alaba monile A. Adams, 1862
- Alaba picta (A. Adams, 1861)
- Alaba pinnae (Krauss, 1848)
- Alaba polyaulax (Tomlin, 1923)
- Alaba pulchra A. Adams, 1862
- Alaba punctostriata A. Gould, 1861
- Alaba semipellucida (Preston, 1905)
- Alaba subangulata A. Adams, 1862
- Alaba supralirata Carpenter, 1857
- Alaba vibex A. Adams, 1862
- Alaba zadela Melvill & Standen, 1896
- Alaba zebrina A. Adams, 1862

Species brought into synonymy

- Alaba adamsi Dall, 1889: synonym of Finella adamsi (Dall, 1889) (superseded combination)
- Alaba albugo Watson, 1886 synonym of Diala albugo (Watson, 1886)
- Alaba catalinensis Bartsch, 1920: synonym of Pseudosabinella bakeri (Bartsch, 1917)
- Alaba cerithidioides Dall, 1889: synonym of Finella dubia (A. d'Orbigny, 1840) (junior subjective synonym)
- Alaba coma Cotton, 1953: synonym of Alaba pulchra A. Adams, 1862
- Alaba conoidea Dall, 1889: synonym of Caelatura rustica (R. B. Watson, 1886)
- Alaba fulva Watson, 1886: synonym of Finella rufocincta (A. Adams, 1861)
- Alaba goniochila (A. Adams, 1860): synonym of Styliferina goniochila A. Adams, 1860
- Alaba incolorata Thiele, 1912: synonym of Bulimeulima incolorata (Thiele, 1912)
- Alaba interrupelineata [sic]: synonym of Alaba interruptelineata Pilsbry & H. N. Lowe, 1932 (misspelling)
- Alaba leithii E.A. Smith, 1876: synonym of Mainwaringia leithii (E.A. Smith, 1876)
- Alaba magna (Gatliff & Gabriel, 1910): synonym of Cingulina magna Gatliff & Gabriel, 1910
- Alaba martensi Issel, 1869: synonym of Diala sulcifera martensi (Issel, 1869) (superseded combination)
- Alaba mirabilis (Hornung & Mermod, 1926): synonym of Gibborissoia virgata (R. A. Philippi, 1849)
- Alaba mutans P. P. Carpenter, 1857: synonym of Lapsigyrus mutans (P. P. Carpenter, 1857) (original combination)
- Alaba oldroydi Dall, 1905: synonym of Lirobarleeia kelseyi (Dall & Bartsch, 1902)
- Alaba opiniosa (Iredale, 1936): synonym of Diffalaba opiniosa Iredale, 1936
- Alaba pagodula A. Adams, 1862: synonym of Alaba monile A. Adams, 1862
- Alaba phasianella Angas, 1867: synonym of Alaba monile A. Adams, 1862
- Alaba semistriata (Philippi, 1849): synonym of Diala semistriata (Philippi, 1849)
- Alaba serrana Smith & Gordon, 1948: synonym of Pseudosabinella bakeri (Bartsch, 1917)
- Alaba striata Watson, 1886: synonym of Finella pupoides Adams A., 1860
- Alaba sulcata Watson, 1886: synonym of Doxander campbelli (Griffith & Pidgeon, 1834)
- Alaba vladivostokensis Bartsch, 1929: synonym of Diffalaba picta (A. Adams, 1861): synonym of Alaba picta (A. Adams, 1861)
- Alaba terebralis Carpenter, 1857: synonym of Microeulima terebralis (Carpenter, 1857)
- Alaba translucida (Hedley, 1905): synonym of Styliferina translucida (Hedley, 1905)
- Alaba violacea Carpenter, 1857: synonym of Microeulima terebralis (Carpenter, 1857)

Taxa inquirenda

- Alaba blanfordi A. Adams, 1862
- Alaba copiosa (Preston, 1915) (unassessed, use in recent literature not established by editor)
- Alaba senegalensis Maltzan, 1885
- Alaba warnefordiana Preston, 1908
