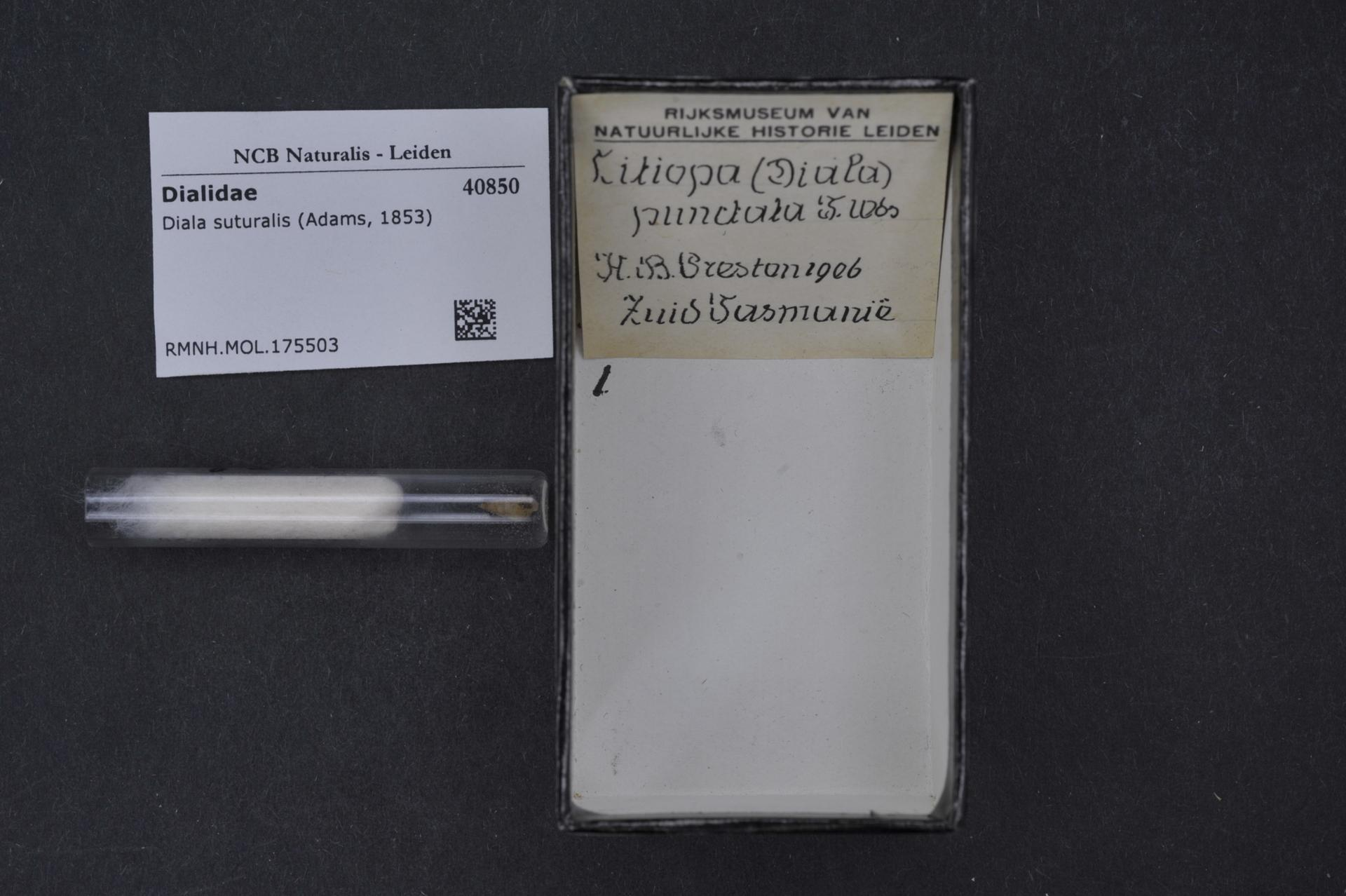
- Diala suturalis

Scientific classification
- Kingdom: Animalia
- Phylum: Mollusca
- Class: Gastropoda
- Subclass: Caenogastropoda
- Order: incertae sedis
- Family: Dialidae
- Genus: Diala; Adams, 1861

Type species
- Diala varia Adams A., 1861

Synonyms
- Alaba (Diala) A. Adams, 1861; Laevitesta Laseron, 1950

= Diala =

Genus of gastropods

Diala is a genus of sea snails, marine gastropod mollusks in the family Dialidae.

== Description ==
The whorls are not varicose, occasionally featuring nodules around the middle. The columella is relatively straight and not truncated. The outer lip is not thickened.

== Species ==
Species within the genus Diala include:

- Diala albugo (Watson, 1886)
- Diala exilis (Tryon, 1866)
- Diala lirulata Thiele, 1930
- Diala megapicalis Ponder & de Keyzer, 1992
- Diala pusilla Thiele, 1930
- Diala semistriata (Philippi, 1849) - type species as Diala varia Adams A., 1861
- Diala stephensae (Baker, Hanna & Strong, 1930)
- Diala sulcifera (A. Adams, 1862) - synonym: Diala flammea (Pease, 1868)
- Diala suturalis (A. Adams, 1863) - synonym: Diala lauta (Adams)
- Diala virgata Hedley, 1899 (taxon inquirendum)

Species brought into synonymy

- Diala acuta Carpenter, 1864: synonym of Pseudodiala acuta (Carpenter, 1864)
- Diala africana Bartsch, 1915: synonym of Diala almo Bartsch, 1915
- Diala almo Bartsch, 1915: synonym of Hydrobiidae incertae sedis almo (Bartsch, 1915) (original combination)
- Diala basispiralis (Chapman-Smith & Grant-Mackie, 1971): synonym of Diala semistriata (Philippi, 1849)
- Diala cacuminata Laseron, 1956: synonym of Diala semistriata (Philippi, 1849)
- Diala capensis G. B. Sowerby III, 1889: synonym of Alaba pinnae (Krauss, 1848)
- Diala conica Turton, 1932: synonym of Diala semistriata (Philippi, 1849)
- Diala cornea A. Adams, 1861: synonym of Alaba cornea (A. Adams, 1861)
- Diala diffilata Laseron, 1956: synonym of Alaba diffilata (Laseron, 1956)
- Diala electrina Carpenter, 1864: synonym of Lirobarleeia Ponder, 1983
- Diala flammea Pease, 1868: synonym of Diala sulcifera (A. Adams, 1862)
- Diala fragilis Thiele, 1930: synonym of Alaba fragilis (Thiele, 1930)
- Diala fuscopicta E. A. Smith, 1890: synonym of Barleeia fuscopicta (E. A. Smith, 1890)
- Diala hartmeyeri Thiele, 1930: synonym of Alaba hartmeyeri (Thiele, 1930)
- Diala infrasulcata G.B. Sowerby III, 1892: synonym of Diala semistriata (Philippi, 1849)
- Diala lauta (Adams, 1862): synonym of Diala suturalis (A. Adams, 1863)
- Diala leithii (E. A. Smith, 1876): synonym of Mainwaringia leithii (E. A. Smith, 1876)
- Diala lirata Laseron, 1950: synonym of Diffalaba opiniosa Iredale, 1936
- Diala ludens Melvill & Standen, 1895: synonym of Diala albugo (Watson, 1886)
- Diala macula Nevill, 1885: synonym of Diala varia A. Adams, 1861: synonym of Diala semistriata (Philippi, 1849)
- Diala marmorea Carpenter, 1864: synonym of Pseudodiala acuta (Carpenter, 1864)
- Diala pinnae (Krauss, 1848): synonym of Alaba pinnae (Krauss, 1848)
- Diala planalba Laseron, 1956: synonym of Diala semistriata (Philippi, 1849)
- Diala polita Preston, 1905: synonym of Diala semistriata (Philippi, 1849)
- Diala simplex E. A. Smith, 1875: synonym of Barleeia simplex (E. A. Smith, 1875)
- Diala stricta Habe, 1960: synonym of Diala semistriata (Philippi, 1849)
- Diala tesselata Tenison-Woods, 1876: synonym of Alaba monile A. Adams, 1862
- Diala translucida Hedley, 1905: synonym of Styliferina translucida (Hedley, 1905)
- Diala trilirata Melvill, 1906: synonym of Diala semistriata (Philippi, 1849)
- Diala varia Adams A., 1861: synonym of Diala semistriata (Philippi, 1849)
- Diala vestigia Laseron, 1956: synonym of Diala semistriata (Philippi, 1849)
- Diala vitrea G. B. Sowerby III, 1915: synonym of Diffalaba vitrea (G. B. Sowerby III, 1915)
- Diala watsoni Laseron, 1956: synonym of Diala semistriata (Philippi, 1849)

Taxa inquirenda

- † Diala angustifera Nomura, 1935
- Diala fragilis (Fenaux, 1943)
- Diala lirata H. Adams & A. Adams, 1864
- Diala nodicincta H. Adams & A. Adams, 1864
- Diala succincta A. Adams, 1870 (unassessed, use in recent literature not established by editor)
