= A. mirabilis =

A. mirabilis may refer to:

- Abagrotis mirabilis, a moth species found in western North America, from British Columbia south to California
- Alaba mirabilis, a sea snail species
- Alicia mirabilis, a sea anemone species
- Ascoseira mirabilis, a brown alga species
- Australartona mirabilis, a moth species found in southern temperate mountain rainforests in New South Wales and southern Queensland

== See also ==
- Mirabilis (disambiguation)
