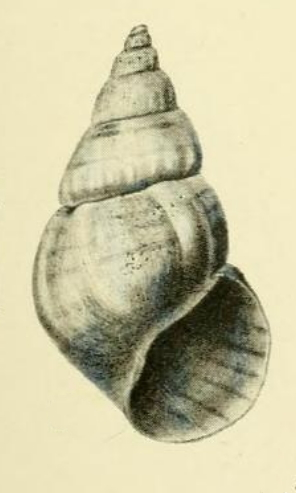
- Shell of Alaba vibex

Scientific classification
- Kingdom: Animalia
- Phylum: Mollusca
- Class: Gastropoda
- Subclass: Caenogastropoda
- Order: incertae sedis
- Family: Litiopidae
- Genus: Alaba
- Species: A. vibex

Binomial name
- Alaba vibex A. Adams, 1862

= Alaba vibex =

Species of gastropod

Alaba vibex is a species of sea snail, a marine gastropod mollusk in the family Litiopidae.

== Description ==
(Original description in Latin) The thin shell is ovate-conical and semi-translucent, exhibiting a lutescent hue with whitish varicose markings. It is intricately adorned with articulated red lines. There are six convex whorls, each transversely furrowed and adorned with strong, milky, irregular varices. The aperture is ovate, with an arched outer lip that is truncated anteriorly and edged sharply.

== Distribution ==
This marine species is endemic to Australia and occurs off Western Australia.
