= Alaba lucida =

Scientific classification
- Kingdom: Animalia
- Phylum: Mollusca
- Class: Gastropoda
- Subclass: Caenogastropoda
- Order: incertae sedis
- Family: Litiopidae
- Genus: Alaba
- Species: A. lucida

Binomial name
- Alaba lucida A. Adams, 1862

Species of gastropod

Alaba lucida is a species of sea snail, a marine gastropod mollusk in the family Litiopidae.

== Description ==
(Original description in Latin) The shell is raised-conical, sub-turreted, solid, and transparent. It has 6.5 flat, overlapping, and very smooth whorls with a spirally striated base. The aperture is ovate, anteriorly produced and effuse, with an outer lip that has a thickened margin.

== Distribution ==
This marine species occurs off Japan.
