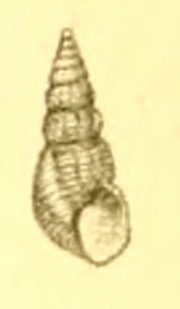
- Drawing of a shell of Alaba hungerfordi (holotype)

Scientific classification
- Kingdom: Animalia
- Phylum: Mollusca
- Class: Gastropoda
- Subclass: Caenogastropoda
- Order: incertae sedis
- Family: Litiopidae
- Genus: Alaba
- Species: A. hungerfordi

Binomial name
- Alaba hungerfordi G. B. Sowerby III, 1894

Synonyms
- Diffalaba hungerfordi (G. B. Sowerby III, 1894)

= Alaba hungerfordi =

Species of gastropod

Alaba hungerfordi is a species of sea snail, a marine gastropod mollusc in the family Litiopidae.

RM Empty Section

== Distribution ==
This marine species occurs off Japan, Korea, Hong Kong and Taiwan; also off Vietnam and Papua New Guinea.
