= Alaba punctostriata =

Scientific classification
- Kingdom: Animalia
- Phylum: Mollusca
- Class: Gastropoda
- Subclass: Caenogastropoda
- Order: incertae sedis
- Family: Litiopidae
- Genus: Alaba
- Species: A. punctostriata

Binomial name
- Alaba punctostriata A. Gould, 1861
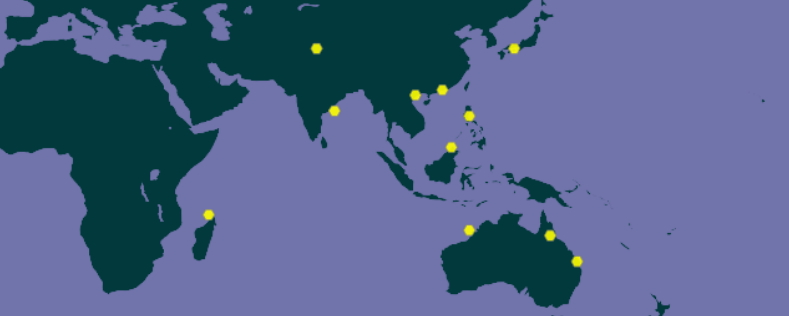

Species of gastropod

Alaba punctostriata is a species of sea snail, a marine gastropod mollusk in the family Litiopidae.

== Description ==
(Original description) The white shell is translucent, appearing hyaline. It is finely spiraled with punctate striations, giving it a delicate texture. The shell consists of 4 convex whorls, with the posterior ones typically left and greener, while the others exhibit rounded varices. The aperture is ovate, slightly widened towards the anterior end. The outer lip is sharp, and the columella displays a distinctive orange hue.

== Distribution ==
This marine species occurs off Japan; also off China, Vietnam, the Philippines, Indonesia, India, Madagascar and Australia.
