= Alaba lixa =

Scientific classification
- Kingdom: Animalia
- Phylum: Mollusca
- Class: Gastropoda
- Subclass: Caenogastropoda
- Order: incertae sedis
- Family: Litiopidae
- Genus: Alaba
- Species: A. lixa

Binomial name
- Alaba lixa (Iredale, 1936)

Synonyms
- Obstopalia lixa Iredale, 1936 (original combination)

Species of gastropod

Alaba lixa is a species of sea snail, a marine gastropod mollusk in the family Litiopidae.

== Distribution ==
This marine species is endemic to Australia and occurs off New South Wales.
