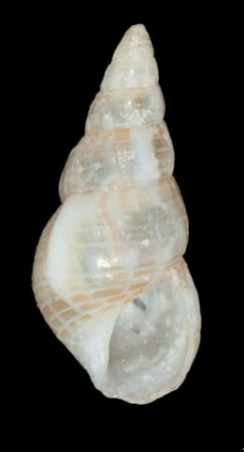
- Shell of Alaba guayaquilensis (specimen at the Smithsonian Institution)

Scientific classification
- Kingdom: Animalia
- Phylum: Mollusca
- Class: Gastropoda
- Subclass: Caenogastropoda
- Order: incertae sedis
- Family: Litiopidae
- Genus: Alaba
- Species: A. guayaquilensis

Binomial name
- Alaba guayaquilensis Bartsch, 1928

= Alaba guayaquilensis =

Species of gastropod

Alaba guayaquilensis is a species of sea snail, a marine gastropod mollusk in the family Litiopidae.

== Description ==
The length of the shell attains 8.1 mm.

(Original description) The shell is elongate-conic. The first four whorls are flesh-colored and the remainder horn-brown with flesh-colored varices. The interior of the aperture is pale brown, and the incised spiral lines are also flesh-colored. The first three whorls are well-rounded and smooth, except for incremental lines. Starting from the fourth whorl, five incised spiral lines are present between the summit and suture. The whorls are marked at irregular intervals by strong, nearly vertical varices. On the body whorl, one varix crosses the entire whorl, preceded at almost regular intervals by four varices that extend slightly beyond the deeply incised spiral lines anterior and posterior to the periphery. The suture is slightly constricted, and the periphery is well-rounded. The base is moderately long and well-rounded, marked by fine incremental lines and five strongly incised spiral grooves. The aperture is broadly oval with an acute posterior angle. The outer lip is thin at the edge with a strong varix immediately behind it. The inner lip is rather stout, and the parietal wall is covered by a thin callus.

== Distribution ==
This marine species occurs off Ecuador.
