= Alaba inflata =

Scientific classification
- Kingdom: Animalia
- Phylum: Mollusca
- Class: Gastropoda
- Subclass: Caenogastropoda
- Order: incertae sedis
- Family: Litiopidae
- Genus: Alaba
- Species: A. inflata

Binomial name
- Alaba inflata A. Adams, 1862

Species of gastropod

Alaba inflata is a species of sea snail, a marine gastropod mollusk in the family Litiopidae.

== Description ==
(Original description in Latin) The thin shell is ovate-conical and ventricose. It is almost translucent and horn-colored, with a violet apex. It has 4½ flat whorls. These are very finely striated transversely. The large body whorl is inflated. The aperture is ovate and slightly angular anteriorly, with an arched outer lip and a thin-edged inner lip.

== Distribution ==
This marine species occurs off Japan.
