= Alaba difformis =

Scientific classification
- Kingdom: Animalia
- Phylum: Mollusca
- Class: Gastropoda
- Subclass: Caenogastropoda
- Order: incertae sedis
- Family: Litiopidae
- Genus: Alaba
- Species: A. difformis

Binomial name
- Alaba difformis (Laseron, 1956)

Synonyms
- Australaba difformis Laseron, 1956 (original combination)

Species of gastropod

Alaba difformis is a species of sea snail, a marine gastropod mollusk in the family Litiopidae.

== Distribution ==
This marine species is endemic to Australia and occurs off the Northern Territory.
