= P. mirabilis =

P. mirabilis may refer to:

- Pisaura mirabilis, a spider species
- Proteus mirabilis, a Gram-negative, facultatively anaerobic bacterium species

== See also ==
- Mirabilis (disambiguation)
