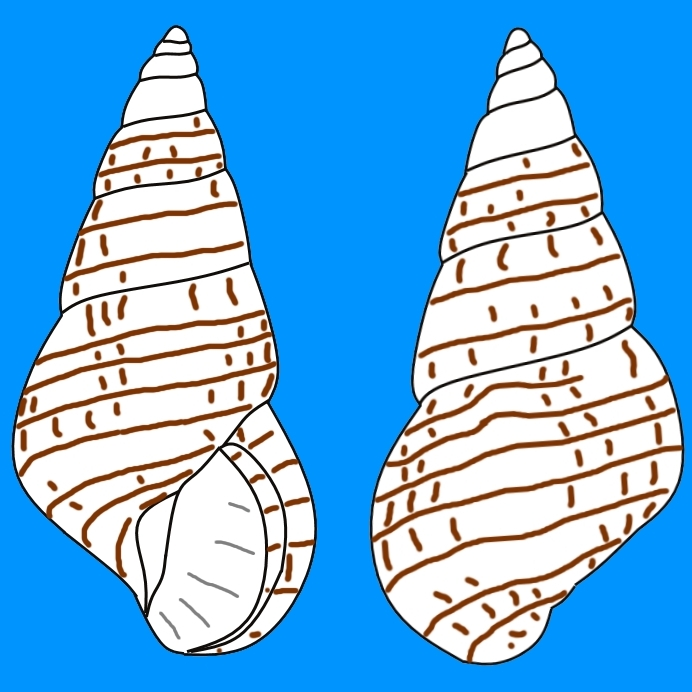

Scientific classification
- Kingdom: Animalia
- Phylum: Mollusca
- Class: Gastropoda
- Subclass: Caenogastropoda
- Order: incertae sedis
- Family: Litiopidae
- Genus: Alaba
- Species: A. picta

Binomial name
- Alaba picta (A. Adams, 1861)
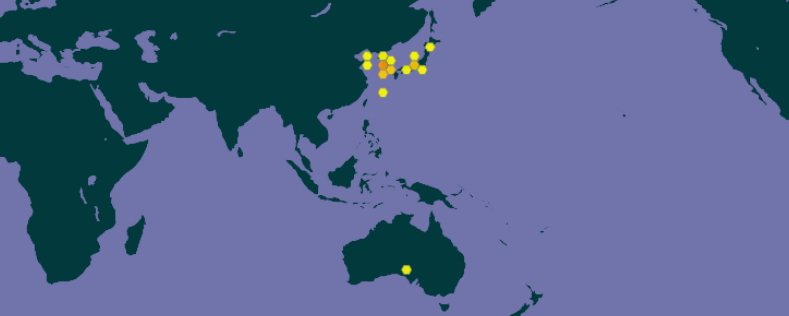

Synonyms
- Alaba vladivostokensis Bartsch, 1929; Diala picta A. Adams, 1861 superseded combination; Diala vitrea G. B. Sowerby III, 1915; Diffalaba picta (A. Adams, 1861); Diffalaba vitrea (G. B. Sowerby III, 1915); Diffalaba vladivostokensis (Bartsch, 1929); † Litiopa simplex Yokoyama, 1927

= Alaba picta =

Species of gastropod

Alaba picta is a species of sea snail, a marine gastropod mollusk in the family Litiopidae.

== Description ==
The length of the shell attains 4.8 mm.

(Original description in Latin) The shell is ovate-conical, semi-opaque, and solid, featuring 6 barely convex whorls and a purple apex. The white surface is neatly painted with three transverse and longitudinal rufescent stripes on each whorl, with the base adorned with concentric red stripes. The aperture is oblong and slightly angular anteriorly, with a straight outer lip and a thickened inner lip.

The animal is semipellucid white, delicately reticulated with red-brown lines. The tentacles are filiform and obtuse at the tips, ringed with red-brown and flecked with opaque white. The right tentacle is significantly longer than the left. The eyes are situated on flattened lobes at the outer bases of the tentacles. The foot is narrow, auriculate on each side in front, with the auricles being linear and recurved. The lobe of the operculum is equipped with four long tentacular filaments: the anterior two are extended to each side when the animal is crawling or swimming, while the posterior two diverge slightly and are directed backward.

When the animal is in motion, its head is concealed by the shell, but its eyes remain visible through the transparent edge. The creature rapidly spins a pellucid thread from a viscous secretion emitted by a gland near the tip of its tail. It swims at the surface of the water with the shell facing downwards. When fatigued, it suspends itself with the apex pointing downwards, using the glutinous thread attached to the surface of the water.

== Distribution ==
This marine species occurs off China, Korea, Japan and New Caledonia.
