= William Healey Dall =

American naturalist (1845–1927)

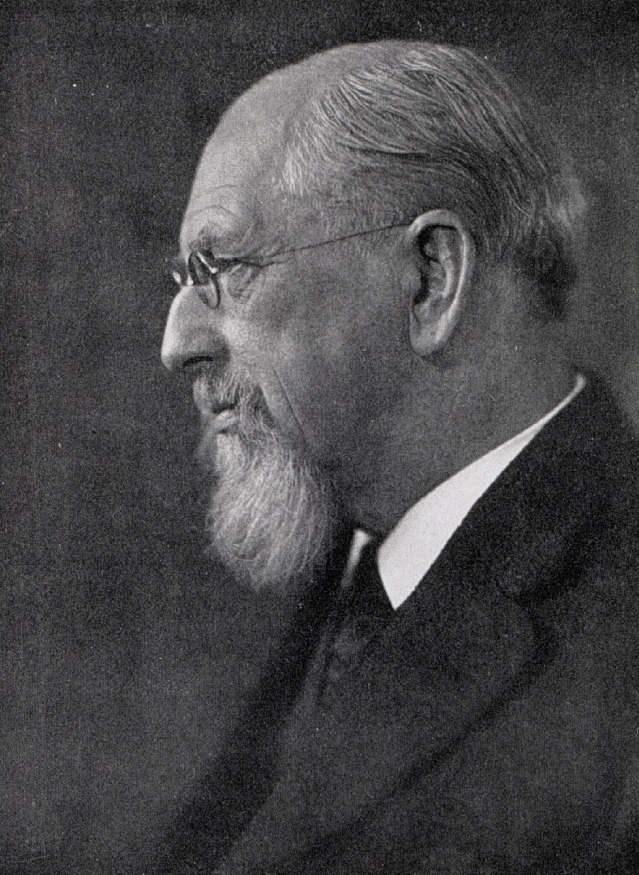
- Born: William Healey Cranch Dall; August 21, 1845; Boston, Massachusetts, United States of America
- Died: March 27, 1927 (aged 81); Washington, D.C., United States of America
- Education: English High School of Boston, Harvard College (did not graduate)
- Known for: Exploration of Alaska, malacology, founding the National Geographic Society
- Spouse: Annette Whitney (married 1880)
- Children: Charles Whitney Dall, Marcus Healey Dall, Marian Dall
- Parent(s): Charles Henry Appleton Dall, Caroline Healey Dall
- Awards: Honorary Doctorate from the University of Pennsylvania, Honorary A.M. from Wesleyan University, Honorary L.L.D. from George Washington University, Gold Medal from Wagner Free Institute of Science
- Scientific career
- Fields: Malacologist, Naturalist, Anthropologist, Biologist, Explorer, Cartographer, Paleontologist
- Workplaces: Western Union, Smithsonian Institution, United States Coast and Geodetic Survey, United States Geological Survey
- Academic advisors: Louis Agassiz
- Author abbrev. (zoology): Dall

William Healey Dall (August 21, 1845 – March 27, 1927) was an American naturalist, a prominent malacologist, and one of the earliest scientific explorers of interior Alaska. He described many mollusks of the Pacific Northwest of North America, and was for many years America's preeminent authority on living and fossil mollusks.

Dall also made substantial contributions to ornithology, zoology, physical and cultural anthropology, oceanography, and paleontology. In addition, he carried out meteorological observations in Alaska for the Smithsonian Institution.

== Biography ==
=== Early life ===
Dall was born in Boston, Massachusetts. His father Charles Henry Appleton Dall, (1816–86), a Unitarian minister, moved in 1855 to India as a missionary. His family however stayed in Massachusetts, where Dall's mother Caroline Wells Healey was a teacher, transcendentalist, reformer, and pioneer feminist.

In 1862, Dall's father, on one of his few brief visits home, brought his son in contact with some naturalists at Harvard University, where he had studied, and in 1863, when Dall graduated from high school, he took a keen interest in mollusks. In 1863 he became a pupil of Louis Agassiz of Harvard's Museum of Comparative Zoology, in natural science. He encouraged Dall's interest in malacology, a field still in its infancy. He also studied anatomy and medicine under Jeffries Wyman.

=== First positions, first expeditions ===
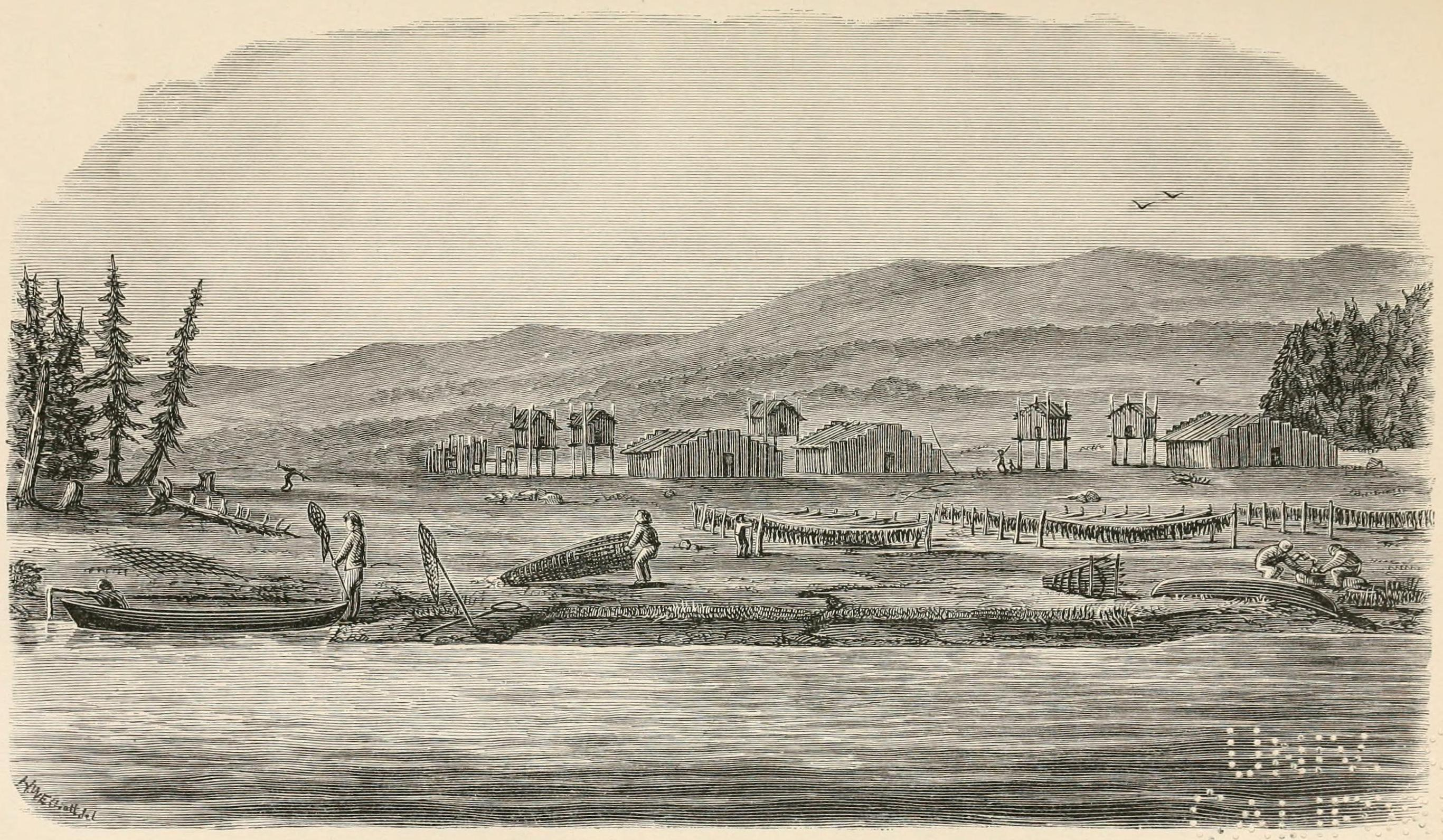
Village on the lower Yukon during fishing season, June 1868, from an original sketch by Dall

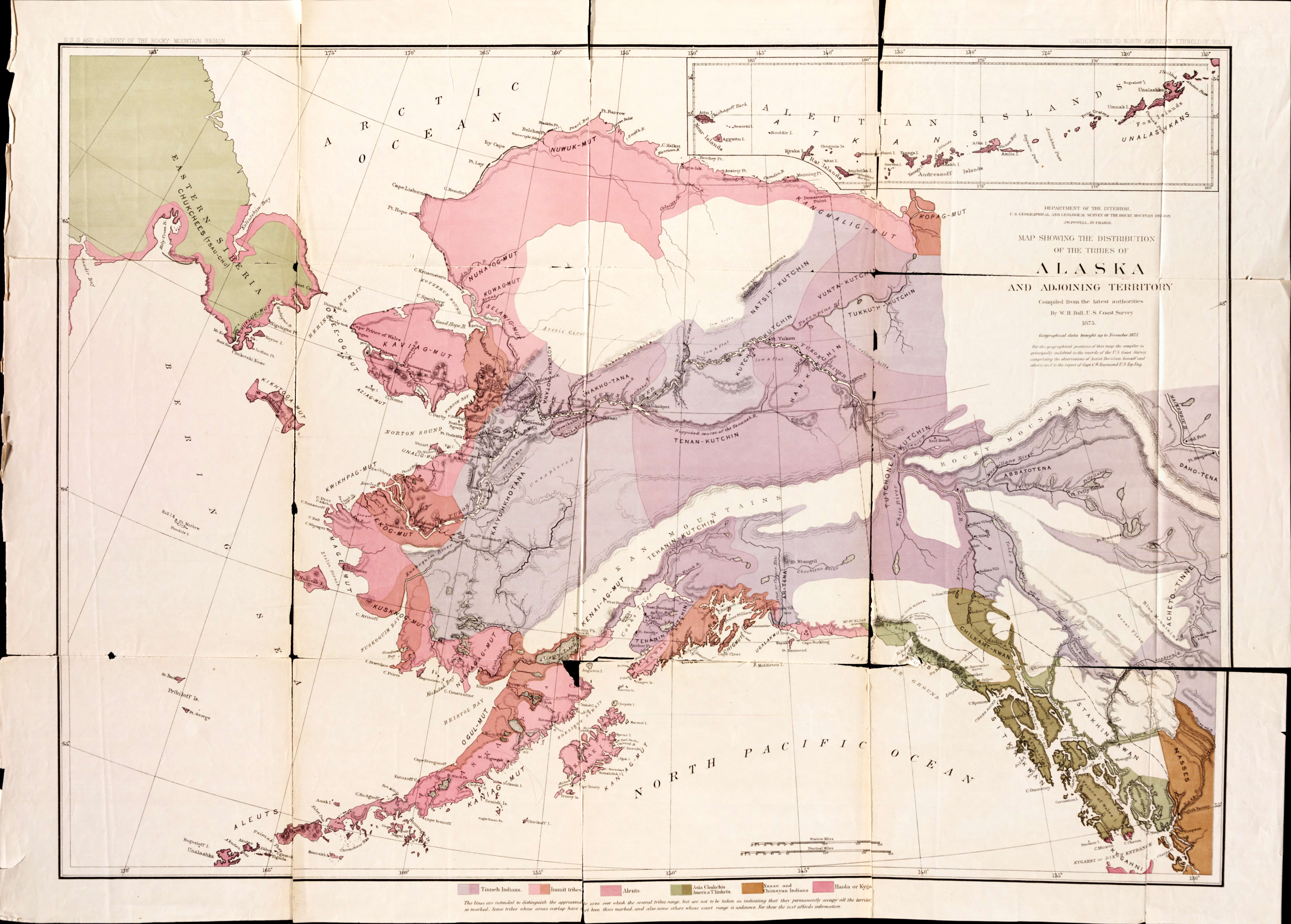
Dall's 1875 map showing the distribution of native tribes in Alaska

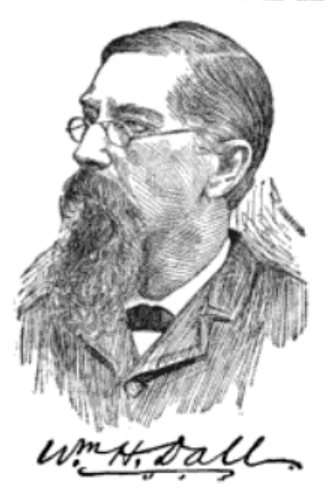
Dall about 1888

Dall took a job in Chicago. There he met the famous naturalist Robert Kennicott (1835–1866) at the Chicago Academy of Sciences Museum. In 1865 the Western Union Telegraph Expedition was mounted to find a possible route for a telegraph line between North America and Russia by way of the Bering Sea. Kennicott was selected as the scientist for this expedition, and with the influence of Spencer Fullerton Baird of the Smithsonian Institution, he took Dall as his assistant, because of his expertise in invertebrates and fish. Aboard the clipper Nightingale, under the command of the naturalist Charles Melville Scammon, Dall explored the coast of Siberia, with first several stops in Alaska (still Russian territory at that time). Scammon Bay, Alaska was named after Charles Scammon.

In 1866, Dall continued this expedition to Siberia. On a stop at St. Michael, Alaska, he was informed that Kennicott had died of a heart attack on May 13, 1866, while prospecting a possible telegraph route along the Yukon River. Set on finishing Kennicott's Yukon River work, Dall stayed on the Yukon during the winter. Because of cancellation of his own expedition, he had to continue this work at his own expense until autumn 1868. Meanwhile, in 1867, the U.S. had acquired Alaska from Russia for 7.2 million dollars. This country was all but unknown among researchers in Europe and the US, and Dall took upon himself as a surveyor-scientist to study the region's economic value and its fauna, flora, Indigenous human inhabitants.

Back at the Smithsonian, he started cataloguing the thousands of specimens he had collected during this expedition. In 1870 he published his account of his pioneering travels in Alaska and Its Resources, describing the Yukon River, the geography and resources of Alaska, and its inhabitants. Also in 1870, Dall was appointed Acting Assistant to the United States Coast Survey (renamed the United States Coast and Geodetic Survey in 1878).

Dall went on several more reconnaissance and survey missions to Alaska between 1871 and 1874. His official mission was to survey the Alaska coast, but he took the opportunity to acquire specimens, which he collected in great numbers. In 1871–72, he surveyed the Aleutian Islands. In 1874 aboard the United States Coast Survey schooner Yukon, he anchored in Lituya Bay, which he compared to Yosemite Valley in California, had it retained its glaciers.

He sent his collection of mollusks, echinoderms, and fossils to Louis Agassiz at Harvard's Museum of Comparative Zoology; plants went to Asa Gray at Harvard; archaeological and ethnological material went to the Smithsonian. In 1877–1878 he was associated with the Blake expeditions", along the east coast of the United States. The major publications on the Blake Expeditions were published in the Bulletin of the Museum of Comparative Zoology Harvard.

Dall was in Europe in August 1878, sent to a meeting in Dublin of the British Association for the Advancement of Science. He took the opportunity to visit mollusk collections and meet European scholars.

=== 1880 and after ===
Dall married Annette Whitney in 1880. They travelled to Alaska on their honeymoon. After arriving in Sitka, his wife went back home to Washington, D.C. He began his final survey season aboard the schooner Yukon. He was accompanied, among others, by the ichthyologist Tarleton Hoffman Bean (1846–1916).

In 1882 Dall contributed for the Republican Congressional Campaign Committee.

In 1884, Dall left the United States Coast and Geodetic Survey (known until 1878 as the U.S. Coast Survey), having already written over 400 papers. In 1885 he transferred to the newly created United States Geological Survey, obtaining a position as paleontologist. He was assigned to the U.S. National Museum as honorary curator of invertebrate paleontology, studying recent and fossil mollusks. He would hold this position until his death.

As part of his work for the U.S. Geological Survey, Dall made trips to study geology and fossils: in the Pacific Northwest (1890, 1892, 1895, 1897, 1901, and 1910), in Florida (1891), and in Georgia (1893).

In 1899 he and an elite crew of scientists, such as the expert in glaciology John Muir, were members of the Harriman Alaska Expedition along the glacial fjords of the Alaska coast and the Aleutian Islands and to the Bering Strait aboard the steamer SS George W. Elder. Many new genera and species were described. Dall was the undisputed expert on Alaska, and the scientists aboard were often surprised by his erudition, both in biology and in respect to the cultures of the native Alaskan peoples. His contributions to the reports of the Harriman Alaska Expedition, include a chapter Description and Exploration of Alaska, and Volume 13, Land and Fresh-water Mollusks.

He spent two months at the Bishop Museum in Honolulu, Hawaii, examining its shell collection.

=== Societies and honors ===
He was elected member of most of the U.S. scientific societies, vice-president of American Academy of Arts and Sciences (AAAS) (1882, 1885), a founder of the National Geographic Society, and the Philosophical Society of Washington. In 1897 he was elected to both the National Academy of Sciences and the American Philosophical Society. He was a Foreign Member of the Geological Society of London. His eminence also earned him several honorary degrees. Mount Dall, an 8,399-foot (2,560 m) peak in the Alaska Range, now in Denali National Park and Preserve, was named after Dall by A. H. Brooks of the U.S. Geological Survey in 1902. In 1912, he was elected to the American Academy of Arts and Sciences.

== Publications ==
Dall published over 1,600 papers, reviews, and commentaries. He described 5,427 species, many of them mollusks. Many of his papers were short, but a number of his publications were comprehensive monographs.

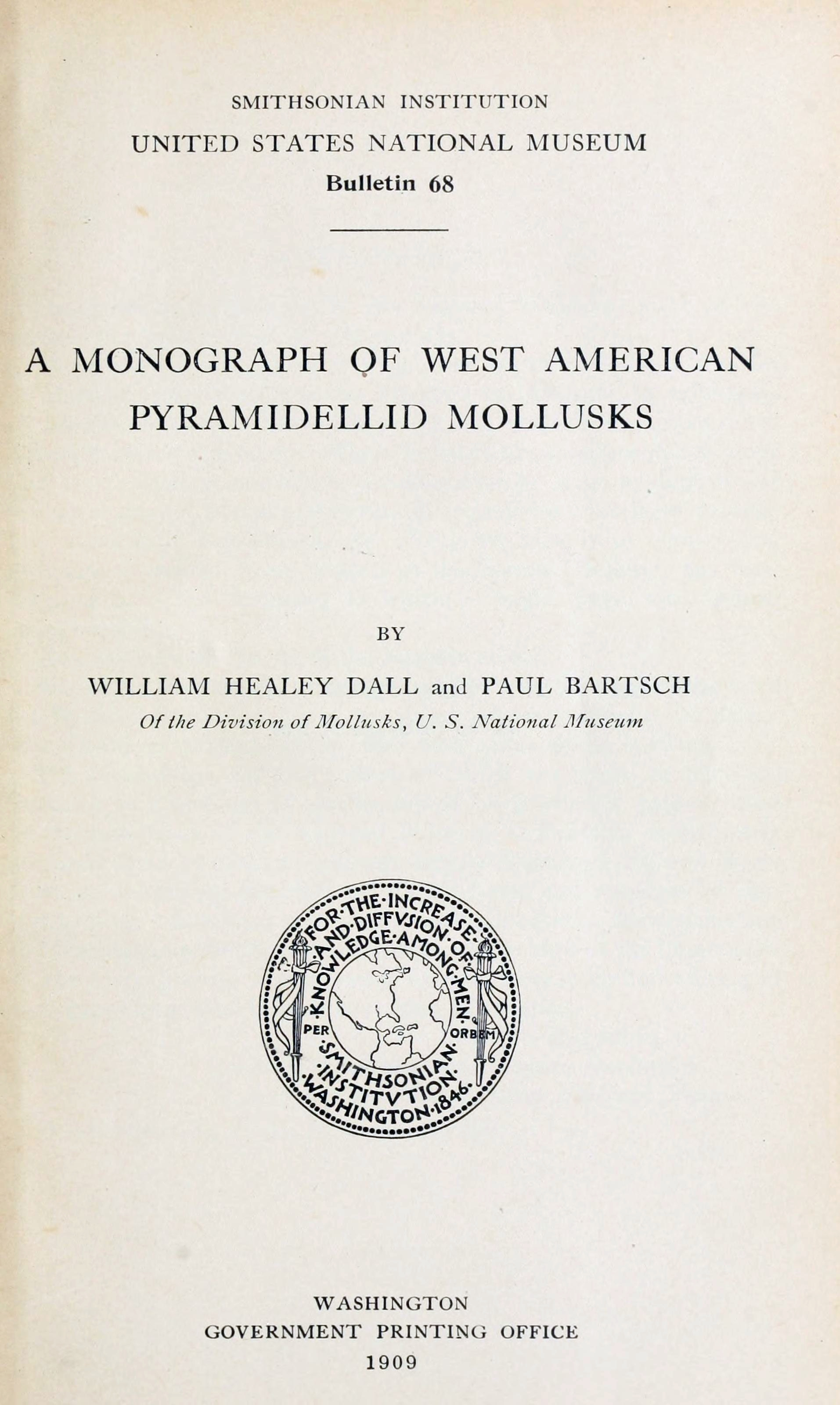
Title page of "A Monograph of West American Pyramidellid Mollusks" (1909)

- Report on the Mollusca, Part I Bivalvia Bulletin of the Museum of Comparative Zoology Harvard, Vol. XII (1885–1886)
- Report on the Mollusca, Part II Gastropoda & Scaphopoda Bulletin of the Museum of Comparative Zoology Harvard, Vol. XVIII, XXIX – (June 1889)
- On the remains of later prehistoric man obtained from caves in the Catherina Archipelago, Alaska Territory, and especially from the caves of the Aleutian Islands (1878)
- Meteorology and Bibliography of Alaska
- The Currents and Temperatures of Bering Sea and the Adjacent Waters (1882)
- Alaska Coast Pilot (1883)
- List of Marine Mollusca (1884)
- Report on the Mollusca Brachiopoda and Pelecypoda of the Blake Expedition (1886)
- Mollusca of the Southeast Coast of the United States (1890)
- Instructions for Collecting Mollusks (1892)
- Contributions to the Tertiary Fauna of Florida (4 vols., 1890–98)
- Neocene of North America (1892)
- Alaska as it was and Is. 1865–1895 (1895)
- Alaska and Its Resources (1870, 1897)
- Dall, William Healey. "Notes on an original manuscript chart of Bering's expedition of 1725-30, and on an original manuscript chart of his second expedition, together with a summary of a journal of the first expedition, kept by Peter Chaplin, and now first rendered into English from Bergh's Russian version." (4° 2 maps. (Coast and Geodetic Survey. Ann. Report, 1890. App. 19, 759–775.)) See National Geographic for a related article by Dall.
- Dall, William Healey.Report of geographic and hydrographical explorations on the coast of Alaska [1873.] (4° 1 map. (Coast Survey. Ann. Report, 1873. App. 11, pp. 111–2.))
- Dall, William Healey. Report on coal and lignite of Alaska. (Geol. Survey. 17 Rpt., pt. 1. 1896. pp. 763–908, pls. 48–58.)
- Dall, William Healey. Report on Mount Saint Elias, Mount Fairweather, and some of the adjacent mountains. (Coast Survey. Ann. Report, 1875. App. 10, pp. 157–88).
- Dall, William Healey. "Tribes of the Extreme Northwest" (Contributions to No. Amer. Ethnology. v. 1, pp. 1–156. ills. 1 map.)
- Dall, William Healey. Map: Showing the distribution of the tribes of Alaska and adjoining territory. 55° to 65° N latitude × 130° to 170° W longitude. Scale: 50 mi (80 km) = 7/8 in (22 mm). Size: 21 3/8 in × 30 1/4 in (540 mm × 770 mm).

== Genera and species named in his honor ==
Brachiopods:

- Dallina Beecher, 1895

Mollusks:

- Conus dalli Stearns, 1873
- Dalliella Cossman, 1895
- Haliotis dalli Henderson, 1915
- Rissoina dalli Bartsch, 1915
- Caecum dalli Bartsch, 1920
- Notoplax dalli Is. & Iw. Taki, 1929
- Knefastia dalli Bartsch, 1944
- Cirsotrema dalli Rehder, 1945
- Hanleya dalli Kaas, 1957
- Propeamussium dalli E.A. Smith, 1886

Crustaceans:

- Chthamalus dalli Pilsbry, 1916

Fish:

- Sebastes dallii C. H. Eigenmann & Beeson, 1894 (Calico Rockfish)
- Lythrypnus dalli (C. H. Gilbert, 1890) (Bluebanded goby)

Mammals:

- Dall's sheep, Ovis dalli Nelson, 1884
- Dall's porpoise, Phocoenoides dalli F. True 1885
- Ursus arctos dalli (Merriam, 1896).

== See also ==
- Category:Taxa named by William Healey Dall
