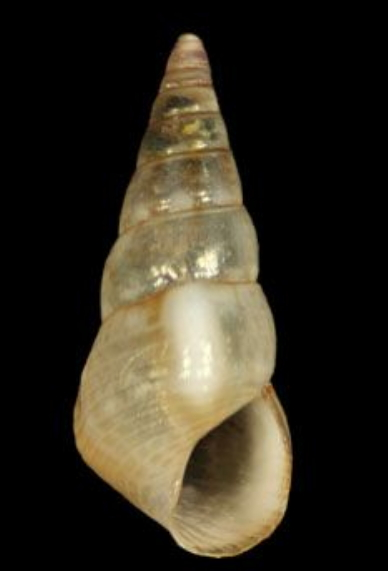
- Shell of Alaba culliereti (specimen at the Natural History Museum, Rotterdam)

Scientific classification
- Kingdom: Animalia
- Phylum: Mollusca
- Class: Gastropoda
- Subclass: Caenogastropoda
- Order: incertae sedis
- Family: Litiopidae
- Genus: Alaba
- Species: A. culliereti

Binomial name
- Alaba culliereti (Dautzenberg, 1891)

Synonyms
- Pseudobittium culliereti Dautzenberg, 1890 (original combination)

= Alaba culliereti =

Species of gastropod

Alaba culliereti is a species of sea snail, a marine gastropod mollusk in the family Litiopidae.

== Description ==
The length of the shell attains 4.3 mm.

(Original description in French) The shell is thin, subpellucid, elongated, and turriculate. The apex is acuminate The shell consists of 13 convex whorls. It features a well-marked suture. The four embryonic whorls are adorned with fine, undulating longitudinal ribs, while the next three whorls are smooth. The last six whorls are crossed by seven narrow, shallow furrows on the penultimate whorl. The furrows at the base of the body whorl are slightly more pronounced. Under higher magnification, very fine growth lines can be distinguished.

The varices are rounded, protruding, irregularly arranged, and number between three and five across the entire whorl, displaying the same striations as the rest of the shell. The aperture is rounded, with the columella slightly arched and twisted at the base, and a smooth basal edge without a siphonal canal or notch. The outer lip is simple, sharp, and regularly rounded. The shell exhibits a horny fawn coloration, with opaque white varices and indistinct fawn flames. The operculum is thin, horny and paucispiral.

== Distribution ==
This marine species occurs off Senegal and the Cape Verde.
