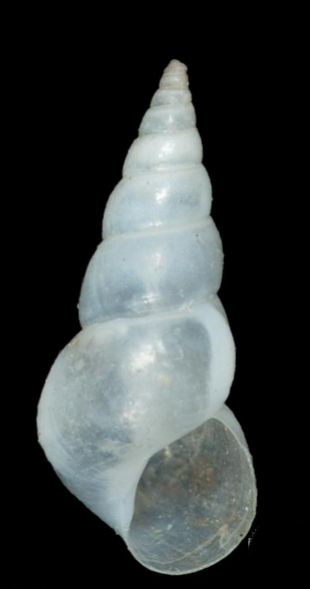
- Shell of Alaba jeanettae (specimen at the Smithsonian Institution)

Scientific classification
- Kingdom: Animalia
- Phylum: Mollusca
- Class: Gastropoda
- Subclass: Caenogastropoda
- Order: incertae sedis
- Family: Litiopidae
- Genus: Alaba
- Species: A. jeanettae

Binomial name
- Alaba jeanettae Bartsch, 1910

= Alaba jeanettae =

Species of gastropod

Alaba jeanettae is a species of sea snail, a marine gastropod mollusk in the family Litiopidae.

== Description ==
(original description) The semitransparent, elongate-conic shell features strong varices scattered irregularly. The protoconch contains four whorls, which continue the spire's general outline. These whorls are well-rounded and smooth, except for very faint, slender axial threads that are typically only visible at the whorl summits. The post-nuclear whorls are also well-rounded and appressed at the summit, with early whorls remaining smooth. Later whorls are marked by slender, incised spiral lines, with those on the anterior half between the sutures and the posterior half of the base usually being more pronounced. Additionally, the whorls have strong, oblique varices at irregular intervals. Sutures are strongly constricted. The body whorl's periphery is inflated and well-rounded. The base is moderately long, well-rounded, and inflated, with its posterior half marked similarly to the anterior half between the sutures, featuring faint variceal extensions. The aperture is very large and broadly oval, with an obtuse posterior angle. The outer lip is thin and transparent. The columella is very oblique and slightly curved, with a slight reflection over the reinforcing base. The parietal wall is glazed with a thin callus.

== Distribution ==
This species occurs in the Pacific Ocean off California and Mexico.
