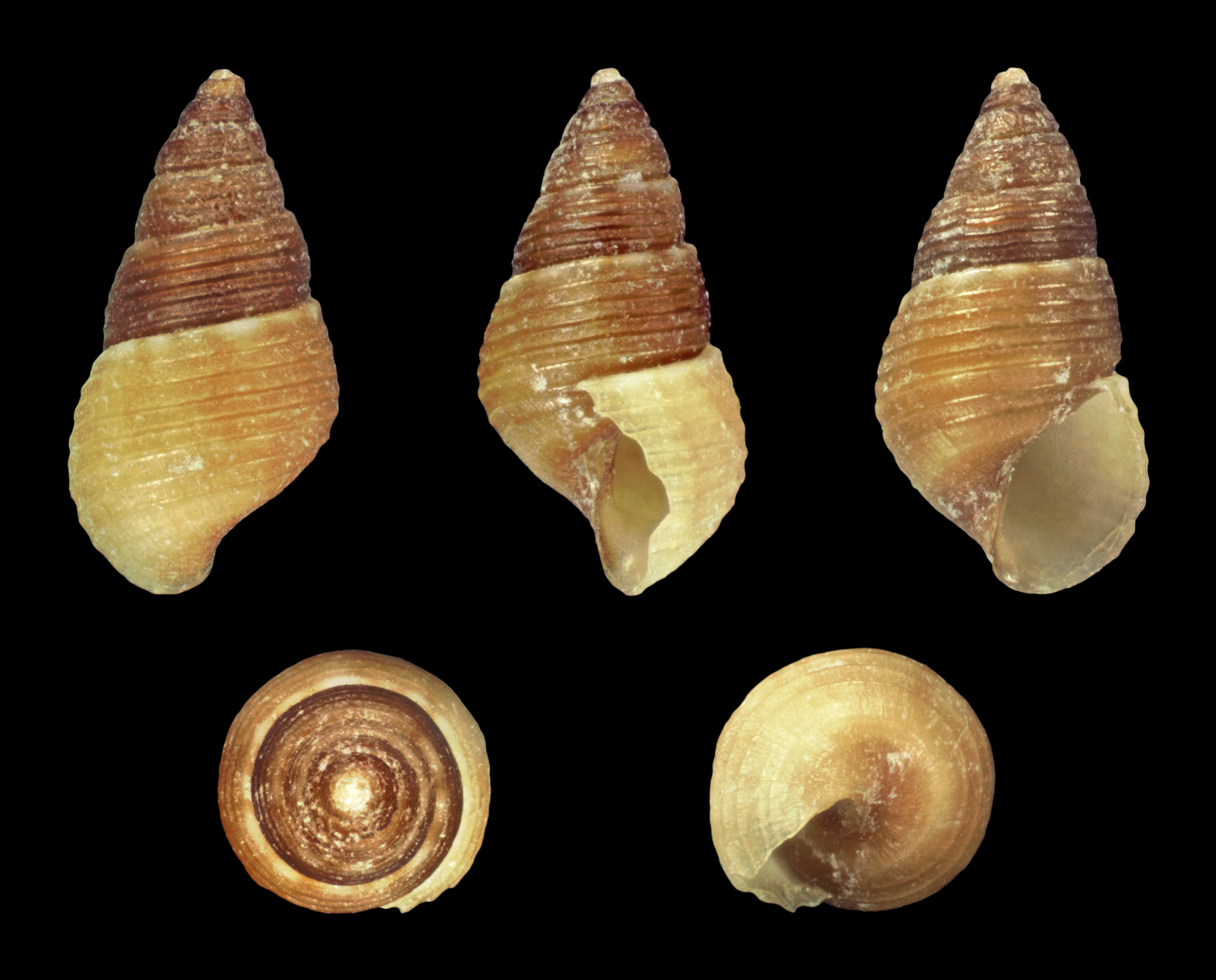
- Shell of Diala sulcifera scobina

Scientific classification
- Kingdom: Animalia
- Phylum: Mollusca
- Class: Gastropoda
- Subclass: Caenogastropoda
- Order: incertae sedis
- Family: Dialidae
- Genus: Diala
- Species: D. sulcifera

Binomial name
- Diala sulcifera (A. Adams, 1862)

Synonyms
- Alaba (Diala) sulcifera A. Adams, 1862 superseded combination

= Diala sulcifera =

Species of gastropod

Diala sulcifera is a species of sea snail, a marine gastropod mollusk in the family Dialidae.

Subspecies

- Diala sulcifera martensi (Issel, 1869)
- Diala sulcifera scobina (Laseron, 1950)
- Diala sulcifera sulcifera (A. Adams, 1862)

== Description ==
The shell size varies between 1.9 mm and 4.5 mm.

(Original description) The shell is ovate-conical and can be white, red, brown, or sometimes variegated. It has 5 convex whorls with regular, deeply imprinted transverse furrows and prominent sutures. The aperture is oblong, and the outer lip is arched, often tinged with red, featuring a crenulate margin.

== Distribution ==
This marine species occurs in the Indo-west Pacific, from the Red Sea to Australia (New South Wales, Queensland)
