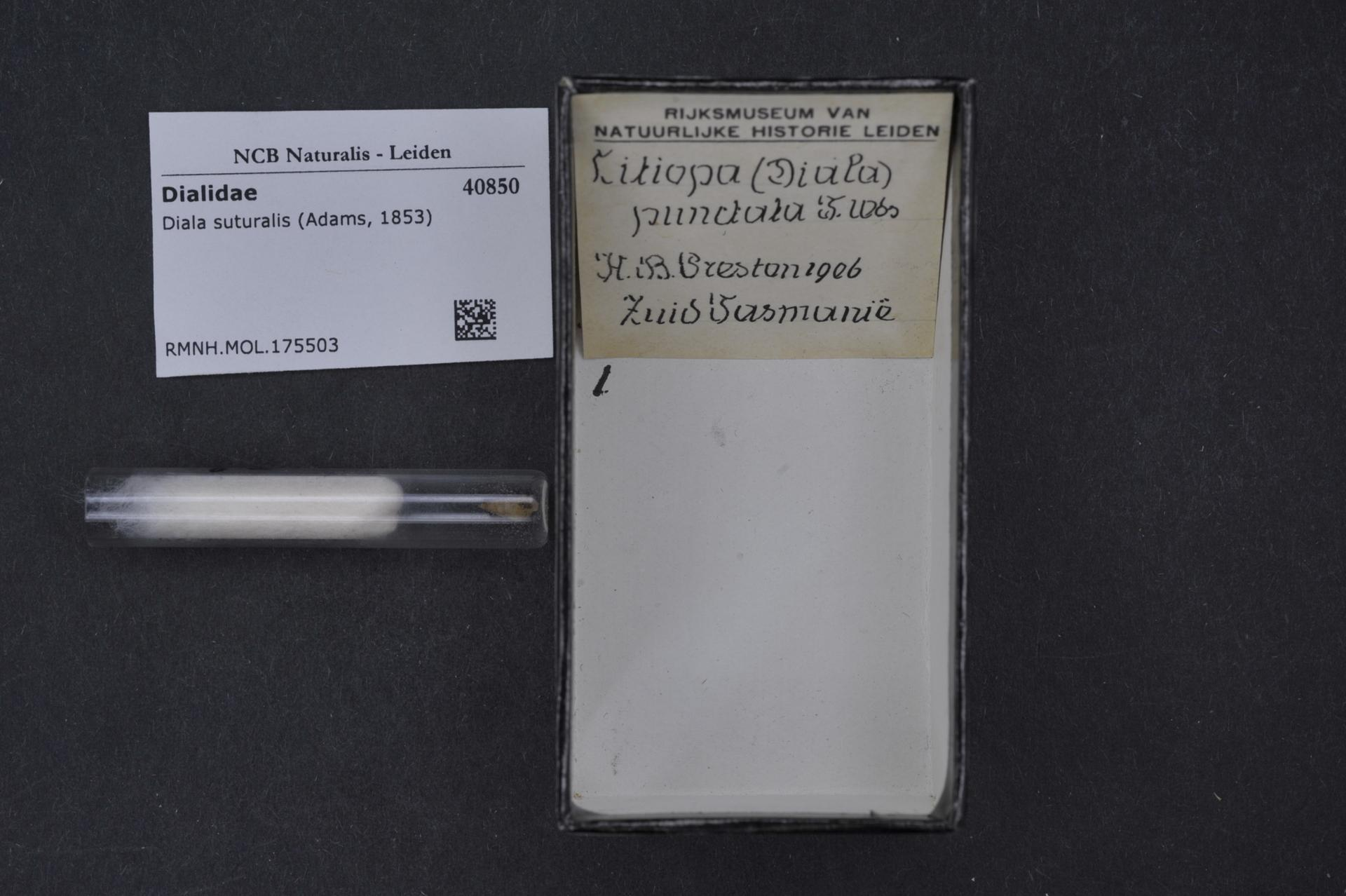
- Museum specimen in test tube

Scientific classification
- Kingdom: Animalia
- Phylum: Mollusca
- Class: Gastropoda
- Subclass: Caenogastropoda
- Order: incertae sedis
- Family: Dialidae
- Genus: Diala
- Species: D. suturalis

Binomial name
- Diala suturalis (A. Adams, 1863)

Synonyms
- Diala lauta (Adams, 1862); Diala punctata Tenison-Woods, J.E., 1876; Diala magna Tate, R., 1891; Diala cento Laseron, C.F., 1956

= Diala suturalis =

Species of gastropod

Diala suturalis is a species of sea snail, a marine gastropod mollusk in the family Dialidae.

== Description ==
The length of the shell attains 13 mm.

== Distribution ==
This species is distributed in the Western Indian Ocean and along Southern Australia and Tasmania.
