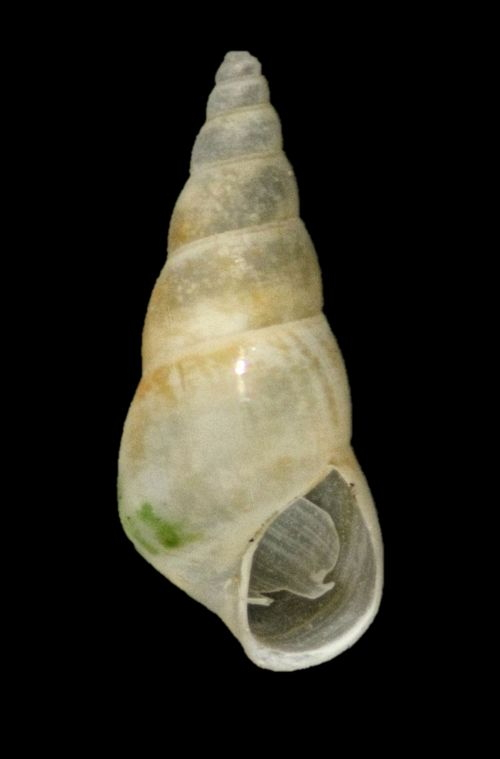
- Shell of Alaba semipellucida (specimen at Naturalis Biodiversity Center)

Scientific classification
- Kingdom: Animalia
- Phylum: Mollusca
- Class: Gastropoda
- Subclass: Caenogastropoda
- Order: incertae sedis
- Family: Litiopidae
- Genus: Alaba
- Species: A. semipellucida

Binomial name
- Alaba semipellucida Preston, 1905

Synonyms
- Diala semipellucida Preston, 1905 superseded combination

= Alaba semipellucida =

Species of gastropod

Alaba semipellucida is a species of sea snail, a marine gastropod mollusk in the family Litiopidae.

== Description ==
(Original description) The shell is elongate-pyramidal and subperforate, exhibiting a shining white, somewhat translucent appearance. A narrow, opaque white band is visible below the sutures. Comprising 8 to 9 rather flat whorls, the shell is finely sculptured with very fine spiral striae. The body whorl is keeled below the periphery. The suture is impressed, and the aperture is oval. The peristome is thin, and the columella is relatively straight, extending into a callosity that joins the lip above.

== Distribution ==
This marine species occurs off Sri Lanka
