= Alaba interrupelineata =

Scientific classification
- Kingdom: Animalia
- Phylum: Mollusca
- Class: Gastropoda
- Subclass: Caenogastropoda
- Order: incertae sedis
- Family: Litiopidae
- Genus: Alaba
- Species: A. interrupelineata

Binomial name
- Alaba interrupelineata Pilsbry & H. N. Lowe, 1932
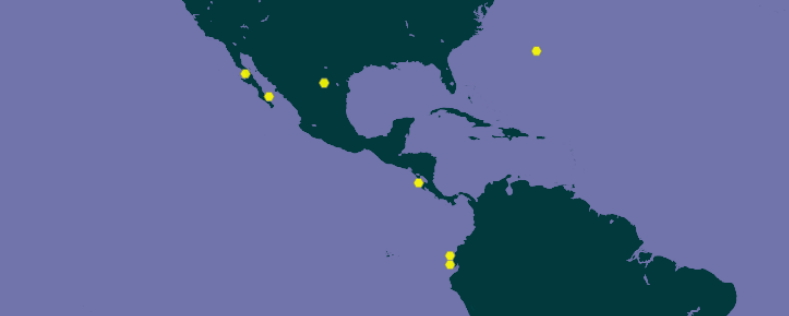

Synonyms
- Alaba interrupelineata [sic] (misspelling)

Species of gastropod

Alaba interrupelineata is a species of sea snail, a marine gastropod mollusk in the family Litiopidae.

== Distribution ==
This species occurs in the Pacific Ocean off Mexico, Nicaragua and Ecuador. It has also been found in the Atlantic Ocean off Bermuda.
