= Alaba felina =

Scientific classification
- Kingdom: Animalia
- Phylum: Mollusca
- Class: Gastropoda
- Subclass: Caenogastropoda
- Order: incertae sedis
- Family: Litiopidae
- Genus: Alaba
- Species: A. felina

Binomial name
- Alaba felina A. Adams, 1862

Species of gastropod

Alaba felina is a species of sea snail, a marine gastropod mollusk in the family Litiopidae.

== Description ==
(Original description in Latin) The solid shell is ovate-conical. it is transparent and is adorned with longitudinal oblique red flames. It has 5 flat, smooth whorls, an almost square aperture, a straight outer lip, and a thickened inner lip.

== Distribution ==
This marine species occurs off Japan.
