= Alaba pulchra =

Scientific classification
- Kingdom: Animalia
- Phylum: Mollusca
- Class: Gastropoda
- Subclass: Caenogastropoda
- Order: incertae sedis
- Family: Litiopidae
- Genus: Alaba
- Species: A. pulchra

Binomial name
- Alaba pulchra A. Adams, 1862

Synonyms
- Alaba coma Cotton, 1953

Species of gastropod

Alaba pulchra is a species of sea snail, a marine gastropod mollusk in the family Litiopidae.

== Description ==
(Original description in Latin) The thin shell is ovate-conical. It is semi-opaque, with a dirty white base color adorned with spots, dots, longitudinal flames, and transverse red lines. It has 7 flat, overlapping whorls that are nodosely plicate at the sutures. The aperture is ovate, with a thin, arched outer lip that is not truncated, and a simple, sharp inner lip.

== Distribution ==
This marine species is endemic to Australia and occurs off South Australia, Tasmania and Victoria.
