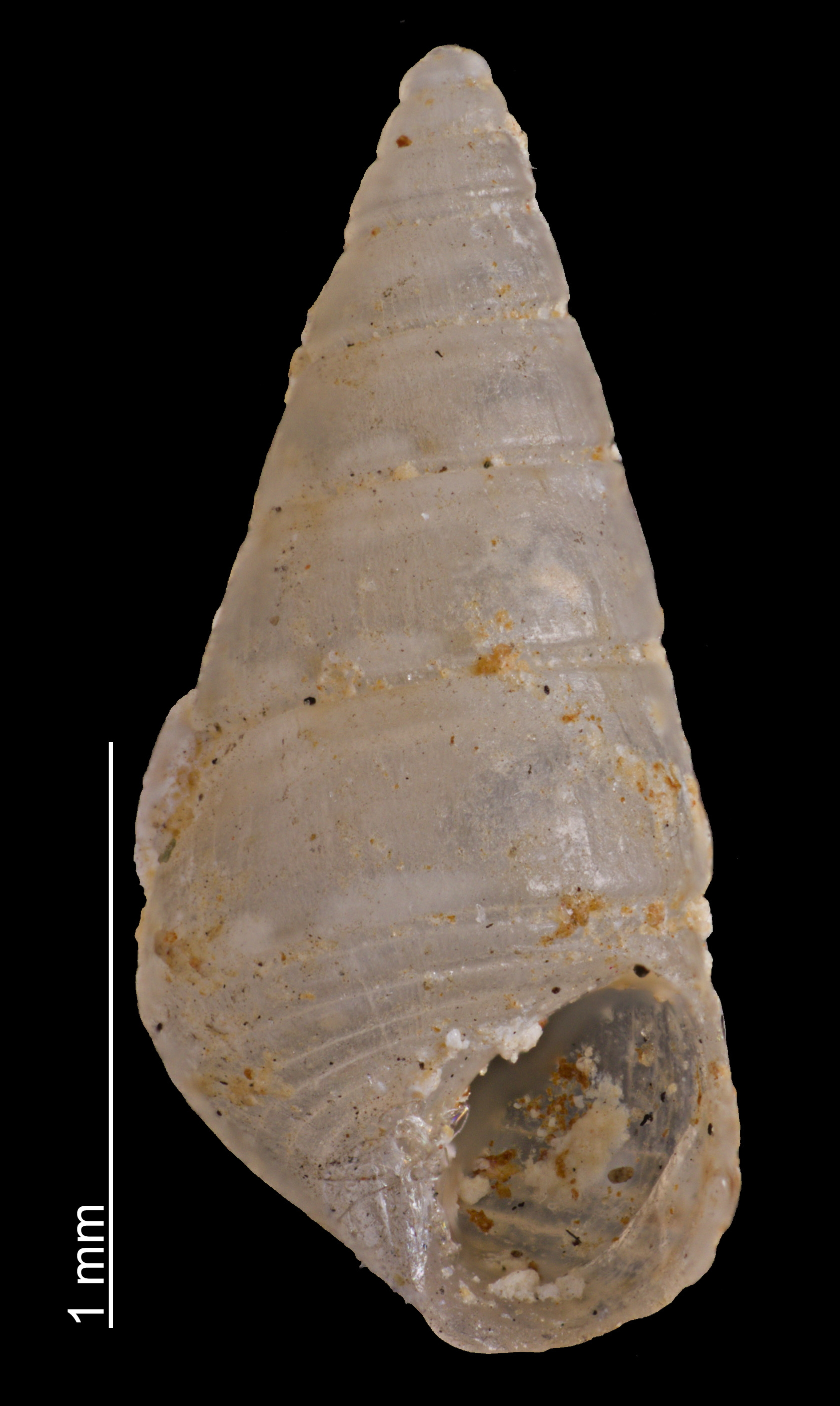
- Shell of Diala sulcifera martensi (syntype at MNHN, Paris)

Scientific classification
- Kingdom: Animalia
- Phylum: Mollusca
- Class: Gastropoda
- Subclass: Caenogastropoda
- Order: incertae sedis
- Family: Dialidae
- Genus: Diala
- Species: D. sulcifera
- Subspecies: D. s. martensi

Trinomial name
- Diala sulcifera martensi (Issel, 1869)

Synonyms
- Alaba martensi Issel, 1869 superseded combination

= Diala sulcifera martensi =

Species of gastropod

Diala sulcifera martensi is a species of sea snail, a marine gastropod mollusk in the family Dialidae.

== Description ==
The length of the shell attains 2.5 mm, its diameter 1 mm.

(Original description in Latin) The small, solid shell is ovate-conoid, and imperforate, with a shiny surface. It features strong transverse striations, with numerous, equal stripes. The apex is sharp, and the shell has 7.5 flat or slightly convex whorls separated by deep sutures. The body whorl is about half the total shell height. it is subangulated at the base, and concentrically furrowed below. The aperture is slightly oblique, ovate-oblong, and angled at the top. The peristome is interrupted and acute, with a reflexed and sharp columellar margin.

== Distribution ==
This species occurs in the Red Sea.
