= Alaba leucosticta =

Scientific classification
- Kingdom: Animalia
- Phylum: Mollusca
- Class: Gastropoda
- Subclass: Caenogastropoda
- Order: incertae sedis
- Family: Litiopidae
- Genus: Alaba
- Species: A. leucosticta

Binomial name
- Alaba leucosticta (A. Adams, 1861)

Synonyms
- Diala leucosticta A. Adams, 1861 (original combination

Species of gastropod

Alaba leucosticta is a species of sea snail, a marine gastropod mollusk in the family Litiopidae.

== Description ==
(Original description in Latin) The solid shell is ovate-conical. It is semi-translucent white, adorned with a series of milky spots at the sutures and periphery. It has 6 convex whorls with margined sutures and a spirally striated base. The aperture is oblong, and the outer lip is arched and thickened.

== Distribution ==
This marine species occurs off China.
