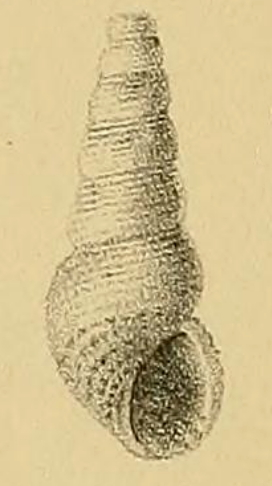
- Shell of Alaba zadela (holotype)

Scientific classification
- Kingdom: Animalia
- Phylum: Mollusca
- Class: Gastropoda
- Subclass: Caenogastropoda
- Order: incertae sedis
- Family: Litiopidae
- Genus: Alaba
- Species: A. zadela

Binomial name
- Alaba zadela Melvill & Standen, 1896

= Alaba zadela =

Species of gastropod

Alaba zadela is a species of sea snail, a marine gastropod mollusk in the family Litiopidae.

== Description ==
The length of the shell attains 5 mm, its diameter 1.5 mm.

(Original description) The shell is small, elongate, and shining ashy-white. It likely comprises ten whorls, though the holotype is broken at the apex. Scattered swollen varices adorn the whorls, interspersed with uniformly spaced spiral lirae, which are minutely dotted with brown. Occasionally, bare patches appear where the varices interrupt the lirae. The body whorl is slightly elongated, and the aperture is ovate with a simple outer lip.

== Distribution ==
This marine species occurs off the Loyalty Islands and New Caledonia
