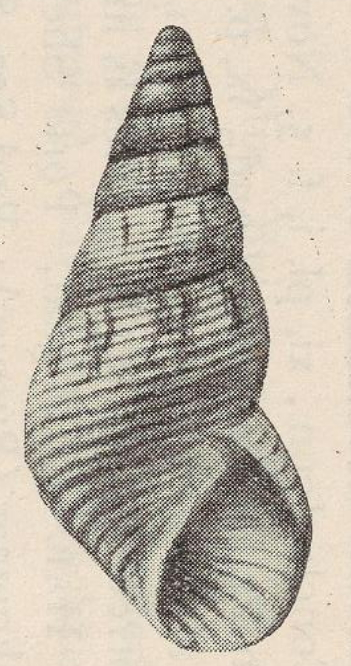
- Shell of Alaba polyaulax (holotype)

Scientific classification
- Kingdom: Animalia
- Phylum: Mollusca
- Class: Gastropoda
- Subclass: Caenogastropoda
- Order: incertae sedis
- Family: Litiopidae
- Genus: Alaba
- Species: A. polyaulax

Binomial name
- Alaba polyaulax (Tomlin, 1923)

Synonyms
- Diala polyaulax Tomlin, 1923 (original combination)

= Alaba polyaulax =

Species of gastropod

Alaba polyaulax is a species of sea snail, a marine gastropod mollusk in the family Litiopidae.

== Description ==
The length of the shell attains 7 mm, its diameter 2 mm.

(Original description) Shell acutely conical, elongate, of a greenish horn-colour, irregularly marked with reddish, interrupted longitudinal streaks; whorls 10, protoconch eroded in all available specimens, the other whorls very regularly spirally grooved, the body whorl having 17 grooves and the penultimate one 8 in the type specimen; the whorls are slightly convex with shallow suture; they are also closely longitudinally ribbed, but this axial sculpture is almost microscopic and visible on the spiral ribs only under a high power; it is more obvious where it crosses the grooves; peristome simple; aperture rather elongate

The shell is sharply conical and elongated, with a greenish horn coloration marked irregularly by reddish, interrupted longitudinal streaks. It consists of 10 whorls. The protoconch is eroded in all available specimens. The subsequent whorls are very consistently spirally grooved, with 17 grooves on the body whorl and 8 on the penultimate whorl in the type specimen. The whorls are slightly convex, with a shallow suture, and are closely longitudinally ribbed. However, this axial sculpture is almost microscopic and visible on the spiral ribs only under high magnification. It becomes more evident where it intersects the grooves. The peristome is simple, and the aperture is rather elongated.

== Distribution ==
This species occurs in the Indian Ocean off Isipingo, South Africa
