= Alaba subangulata =

Scientific classification
- Kingdom: Animalia
- Phylum: Mollusca
- Class: Gastropoda
- Subclass: Caenogastropoda
- Order: incertae sedis
- Family: Litiopidae
- Genus: Alaba
- Species: A. subangulata

Binomial name
- Alaba subangulata A. Adams, 1862

Species of gastropod

Alaba subangulata is a species of sea snail, a marine gastropod mollusk in the family Litiopidae.

== Description ==
(Original description in Latin) The thin shell is ovate-conical. It is green, interrupted by transverse rufescent lines and adorned with irregular rufescent spots at the sutures. It features flat whorls that are frequently transversely furrowed and become slightly angular at the periphery. The aperture is square-circular, produced and shed in front, with a thin, straight outer lip. The edge of the inner lip is bluntly angled in the middle.

== Distribution ==
This marine species occurs off Japan.
