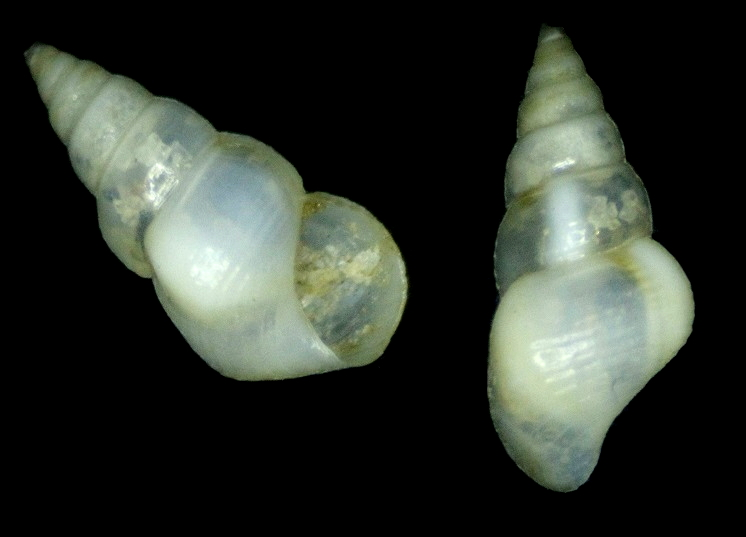
- Shell of Alaba supralirata

Scientific classification
- Kingdom: Animalia
- Phylum: Mollusca
- Class: Gastropoda
- Subclass: Caenogastropoda
- Order: incertae sedis
- Family: Litiopidae
- Genus: Alaba
- Species: A. supralirata

Binomial name
- Alaba supralirata P.P.K Carpenter

= Alaba supralirata =

Species of gastropod

Alaba supralirata is a species of sea snail, a marine gastropod mollusk in the family Litiopidae.

== Description ==
The length of the shell attains 6.8 mm, its diameter 2.6 mm.

(original description) The shell is elongate-conic with very strong varices forming more or less continuous lines over the whorls. It is semitransparent. The protoconch consists of four whorls that continue the general outline of the spire with minimal interruption. The first whorl is smooth, while the subsequent whorls are marked by slender, axial riblets, with about forty-two riblets on each of the last two whorls. The spaces between these riblets are about twice as wide as the riblets themselves. Additionally, the last two whorls are marked by a slender spiral cord located about one-third of the distance between the sutures, anterior to the summit.

The post-nuclear whorls are well-rounded and appressed at the summit. The first three post-nuclear whorls are smooth, while the fourth exhibits fine, irregularly spaced, incised lines that increase in size on the succeeding whorls, becoming very pronounced on the last whorls. On the penultimate whorl, there are ten such lines between the summit and the periphery. These lines, equally strong, pass over both the varices and the spaces between them. In addition to the spiral sculpture, the whorls are marked by conspicuous lines of growth.

The suture is strongly constricted. The periphery of the body whorl and the moderately long base are somewhat inflated and strongly rounded, sculpted similarly to the space between the sutures. The aperture is rather large and broadly oval, with an obtuse posterior angle. The outer lip is thin, revealing the external sculpture within. The columella is oblique, somewhat curved, and slightly revolute. The parietal wall is covered with a moderately thick callus.

== Distribution ==
This species occurs in the Mazatlan Basin in the Baja California Peninsula; also off Costa Rica and Ecuador.
