= Alaba zebrina =

Scientific classification
- Kingdom: Animalia
- Phylum: Mollusca
- Class: Gastropoda
- Subclass: Caenogastropoda
- Order: incertae sedis
- Family: Litiopidae
- Genus: Alaba
- Species: A. zebrina

Binomial name
- Alaba zebrina A. Adams, 1862

Species of gastropod

Alaba zebrina is a species of sea snail, a marine gastropod mollusk in the family Litiopidae.

== Description ==
(Original description in Latin) The thin shell is ovate-conical and imperforate. It has a white surface ornamented by longitudinal undulating red-brown stripes. It has 6½ flat whorls that are strongly and regularly furrowed transversely, occasionally exhibiting obsolete longitudinal varices. The sutures are impressed and adorned with a series of spots. The aperture is ovate and slightly produced anteriorly, with a curved outer lip that has a simple, sharp edge.

== Distribution ==
This marine species occurs off Japan and the Philippines.
