= Alaba imbricata =

Scientific classification
- Kingdom: Animalia
- Phylum: Mollusca
- Class: Gastropoda
- Subclass: Caenogastropoda
- Order: incertae sedis
- Family: Litiopidae
- Genus: Alaba
- Species: A. imbricata

Binomial name
- Alaba imbricata A. Adams, 1862

Species of gastropod

Alaba imbricata is a species of sea snail, a marine gastropod mollusk in the family Litiopidae.

== Description ==
(Original description in Latin) The shell is elevated-conical and sub-turreted. It is semi-opaque white, sporadically tinged with red. It features 7 flat, overlapping whorls with distant, longitudinal folds, that form varices, and transverse furrows. The aperture is subcircular, with a thin, arched outer lip that is scarcely effuse and has a thickened margin.

== Distribution ==
This marine species occurs off Japan.
