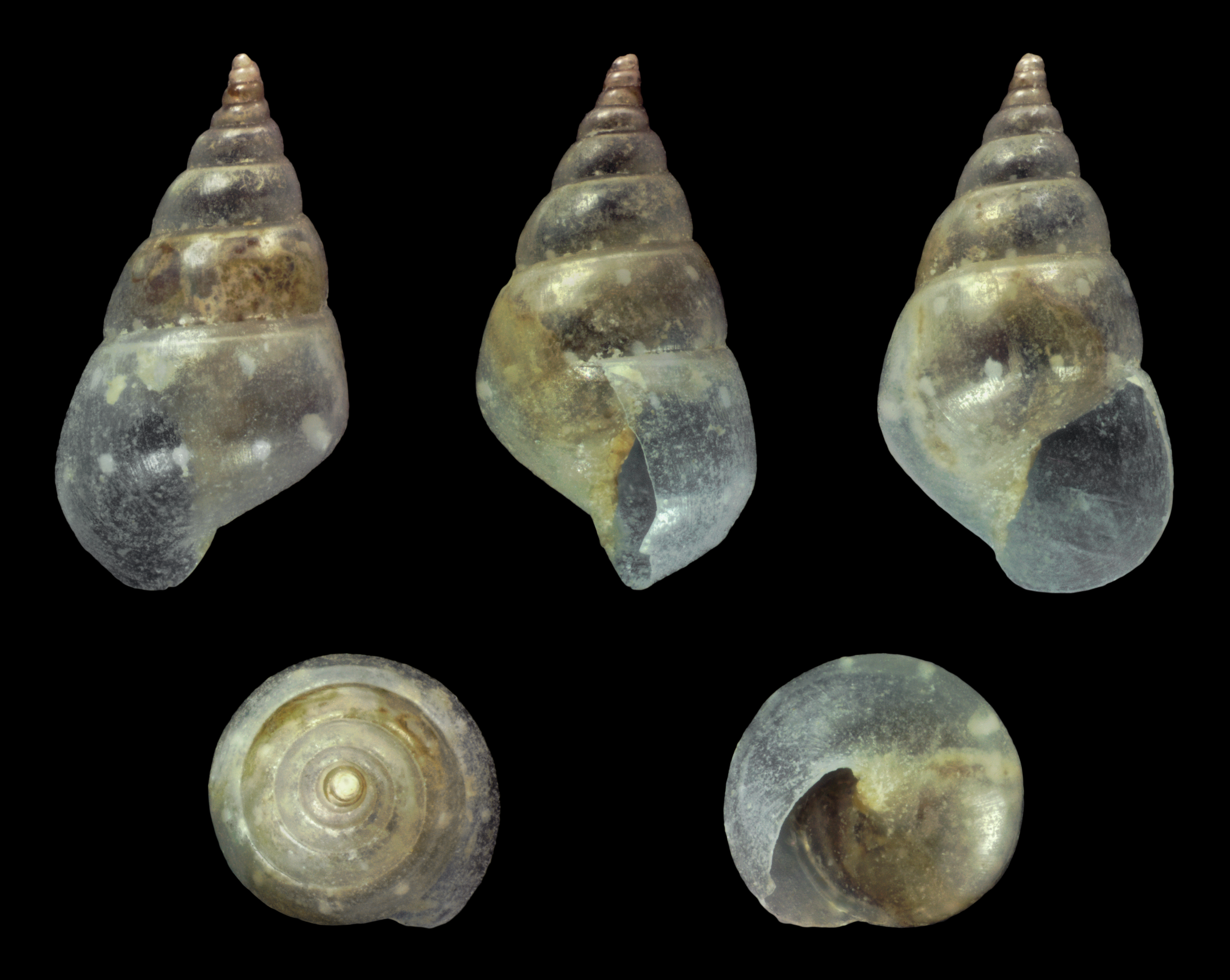
- Styliferina goniochila Adams, 1860

Scientific classification
- Kingdom: Animalia
- Phylum: Mollusca
- Class: Gastropoda
- Subclass: Caenogastropoda
- Order: incertae sedis
- Family: Litiopidae
- Genus: Styliferina; A. Adams, 1860

Type species
- Styliferina goniochila A. Adams, 1860

Synonyms
- Dialessa Iredale, 1955; Eulima (Stiliferina); Macertexta Laseron, 1955

= Styliferina =

Genus of gastropods

Styliferina is a genus of sea snails, marine gastropod mollusks in the family Litiopidae.

== Species ==
Species within the genus Styliferina include:

- Styliferina goniochila A. Adams, 1860
- Styliferina lepida A. Adams, 1862
- Styliferina orthochila A. Adams, 1860
- Styliferina translucida (Hedley, 1905)

Species brought into synonymy

- Styliferina turrita Carpenter, 1866: synonym of Alabina turrita (Carpenter, 1866)

Nomen dubium

- Styliferina callosa A. Adams, 1870
