= Gibborissoia =

Scientific classification
- Kingdom: Animalia
- Phylum: Mollusca
- Class: Gastropoda
- Subclass: Caenogastropoda
- Order: incertae sedis
- Family: Litiopidae
- Genus: Gibborissoia; Sacco, 1899

Synonyms
- List: Alaba (Gibborissoa) Cossmann, 1921; Alaba (Gibborissoia) Sacco, 1895; Gibborissoa Cossmann, 1921; †Littorina (Touzinia) Cossmann, 1916; †Rissoa (Alaba)

Genus of gastropods

Gibborissoia is a genus of sea snails, marine gastropod mollusks in the family Litiopidae.

== Species ==
The following species are recognised in the genus Gibborissoia:

- † Gibborissoia angulosa Landau, Harzhauser, İslamoğlu & Silva, 2013
- †Gibborissioa denudata (Hilber, 1879)
- † Gibborissoia inexpectata Harzhauser, 2014
- † Gibborissoia morgani (Cossmann & Peyrot, 1918)
- † Gibborissoia varicosa (Basterot, 1825)
- Gibborissoia virgata (R. A. Philippi, 1849)

Synonyms

- † Gibborissoia costellata (Grateloup, 1828): synonym of † Gibborissoia varicosa (Basterot, 1825)
- Gibborissoia mirabilis Hornung & Mermod, 1926: synonym of Gibborissoia virgata (R. A. Philippi, 1849)
- †Gibborissoia prevostina (Basterot, 1825): synonym of † Littorinopsis prevostina (Basterot, 1825): synonym of † Littoraria (Littorinopsis) prevostina (Basterot, 1825) represented as † Littoraria prevostina (Basterot, 1825)
