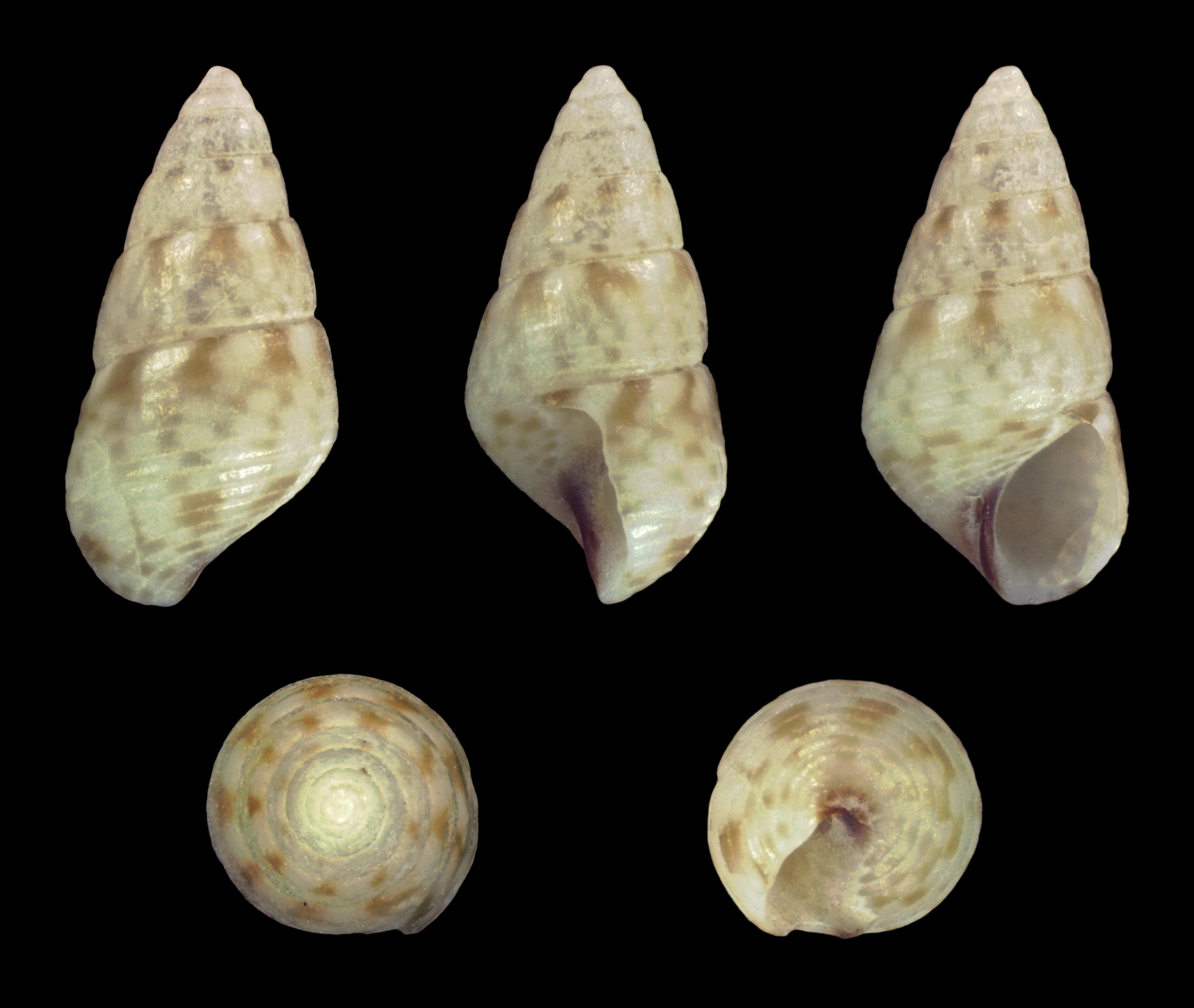

Scientific classification
- Kingdom: Animalia
- Phylum: Mollusca
- Class: Gastropoda
- Subclass: Caenogastropoda
- Order: incertae sedis
- Family: Dialidae
- Genus: Diala
- Species: D. albugo

Binomial name
- Diala albugo (Watson, 1886)

Synonyms
- List: Alaba albugo Watson, 1886; Diala conspicua Laseron, 1956; Diala ludens Melvill & Standen, 1895; Diala virgata Hedley, 1899

= Diala albugo =

Species of gastropod

Diala albugo is a species of sea snail, a marine gastropod mollusk in the family Dialidae.

== Description ==
The shell size varies between 2 mm and 6.5 mm.

== Distribution ==
This species is distributed in the Indian Ocean along Réunion and in the Pacific Ocean along the Philippines.
