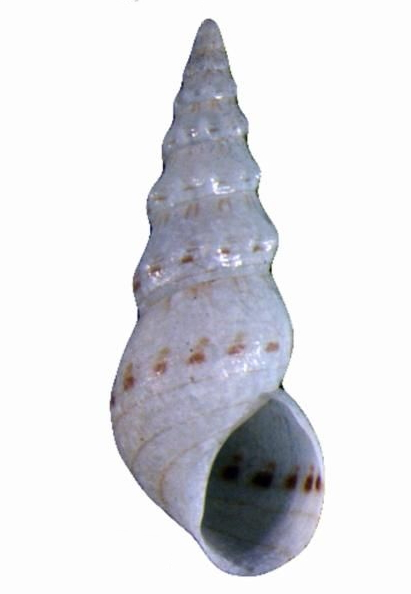
- Shell of Alaba monile (specimen at the Tasmanian Museum and Art Gallery)

Scientific classification
- Kingdom: Animalia
- Phylum: Mollusca
- Class: Gastropoda
- Subclass: Caenogastropoda
- Order: incertae sedis
- Family: Litiopidae
- Genus: Alaba
- Species: A. monile

Binomial name
- Alaba monile A. Adams, 1862

Synonyms
- Alaba monile isidis (Thiele, 1930); Alaba pagodula A. Adams, 1862; Alaba phasianella Angas, 1867; Diala monile A. Adams, 1862; Diala monile isidis Thiele, 1930 (junior synonym); Diala tesselata Tenison Woods, 1876 junior subjective synonym; Rissoina stclarae Tenison Woods, 1877 ·

= Alaba monile =

Species of gastropod

Alaba monile is a species of sea snail, a marine gastropod mollusk in the family Litiopidae.

== Description ==
(Original description in Latin) The shell is elongate-conical. It is white, ornamented with a row of red spots arranged in necklace-like series in the middle of the whorls. It has 6 flat, overlapping whorls with longitudinal nodose folds. The aperture is ovate, with a regularly arched outer lip and an inner lip edge that is subtly angulated in the middle. The shell lacks a siphonal canal.

== Distribution ==
This marine species is endemic to Australia and occurs off New South Wales, South Australia, Tasmania, Victoria and Western Australia
