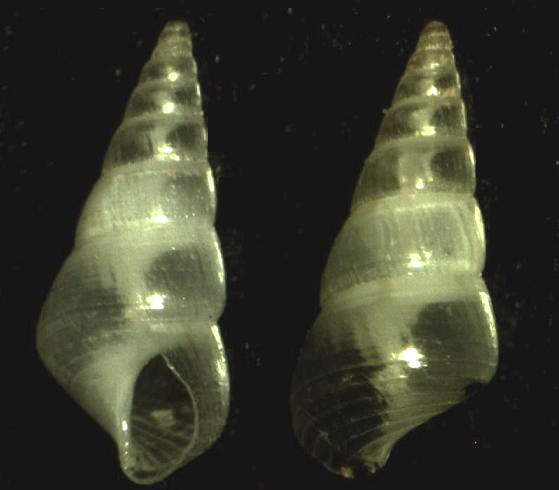
- Shell of Alaba incerta

Scientific classification
- Kingdom: Animalia
- Phylum: Mollusca
- Class: Gastropoda
- Subclass: Caenogastropoda
- Order: incertae sedis
- Family: Litiopidae
- Genus: Alaba
- Species: A. incerta

Binomial name
- Alaba incerta (d’Orbigny, 1841)
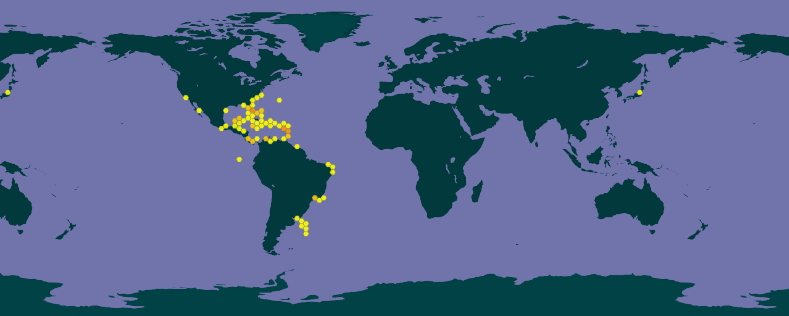

Synonyms
- Eulima incerta d'Orbigny, 1841 (original combination); Rissoa melanura C. B. Adams, 1850; Rissoa tervaricosa C. B. Adams, 1845 (junior synonym)

= Alaba incerta =

Species of gastropod

Alaba incerta is a species of sea snail, a marine gastropod mollusk in the family Litiopidae.

== Description ==
(Described as Rissoa melanura) The shell is conic and turrited. It is white and subtransparent with a black apex. It is nearly smooth and is shining. It features some spiral striae that are distinct anteriorly and on the lower part of the whorls of the spire, but obsolete on the upper part. The apex is acute, and the spire has nearly rectilinear outlines. There are eight quite convex whorls with a rather deep suture. The aperture is scarcely effuse, and the outer lip is thin and well-excurved below the middle. The columella is straight and subtruncate.

== Distribution ==
This species occurs in the Caribbean Sea and off the Lesser Antilles.

== Description ==
The maximum recorded shell length is 10 mm.

== Habitat ==
Minimum recorded depth is 0 m. Maximum recorded depth is 40 m.
