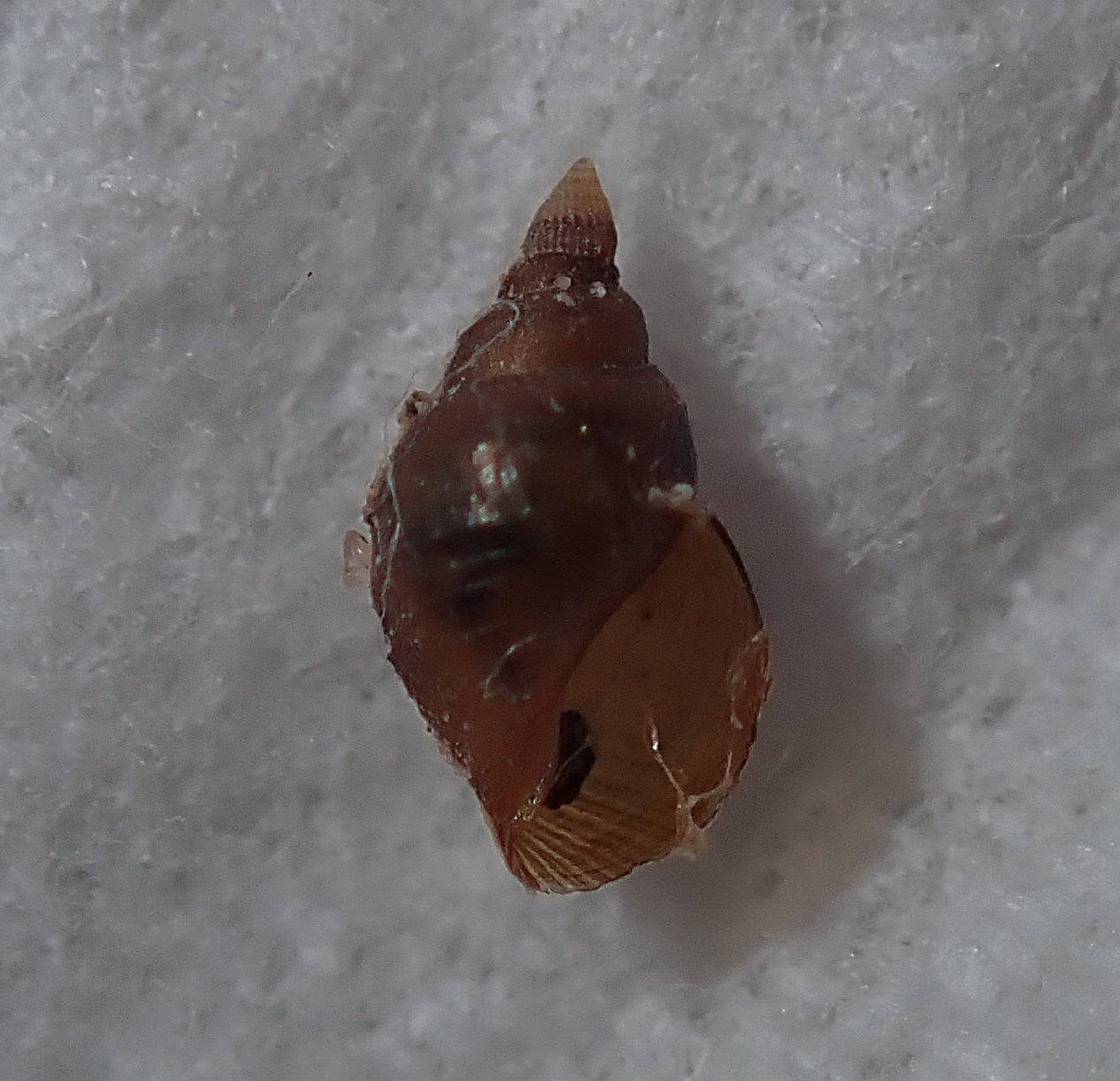
- Litiopa limnophysa

Scientific classification
- Kingdom: Animalia
- Phylum: Mollusca
- Class: Gastropoda
- Subclass: Caenogastropoda
- Order: incertae sedis
- Family: Litiopidae
- Genus: Litiopa; Rang, 1829

Synonyms
- Abaconia Clench, 1938; Bombyxinus Bélanger in Lesson, 1834; †Buccinopsis Deshayes, 1865; Leptinaria (Abaconia) Clench, 1938

= Litiopa =

Genus of gastropods

Litiopa is a genus of sea snails, marine gastropod mollusks in the family Litiopidae.

== Species ==
The following species are recognised in the genus Litiopa:

- †Litiopa acuminata (Baudon, 1853)
- †Litiopa alnensis Cossmann, 1907
- †Litiopa insolita (Deshayes, 1865)
- Litiopa limnophysa Melvill & Standen, 1896
- Litiopa melanostoma (Rang, 1829)
- Litiopa nipponica Kuroda & Kawamoto, 1956
- †Litiopa punctulifera Tate, 1894
- †Litiopa texana Garvie, 1996
- Litiopa tumescens (Thiele, 1925)
- †Litiopa turriculata (Cossmann, 1896)

Former species

- Litiopa bucciniformis Hornung & Mermod, 1926 - synonymized with Bittium proteum (Jousseaume, 1931)
- Litiopa effusa C. B. Adams, 1850 - synonymized with Monoplex pilearis (Linnaeus, 1758)
- Litiopa obesa C. B. Adams, 1850 - synonymized with Gutturnium muricinum (Röding, 1798)
- Litiopa saxicola C. B. Adams, 1852 - synonymized with Elachisina saxicola (C. B. Adams, 1852)
