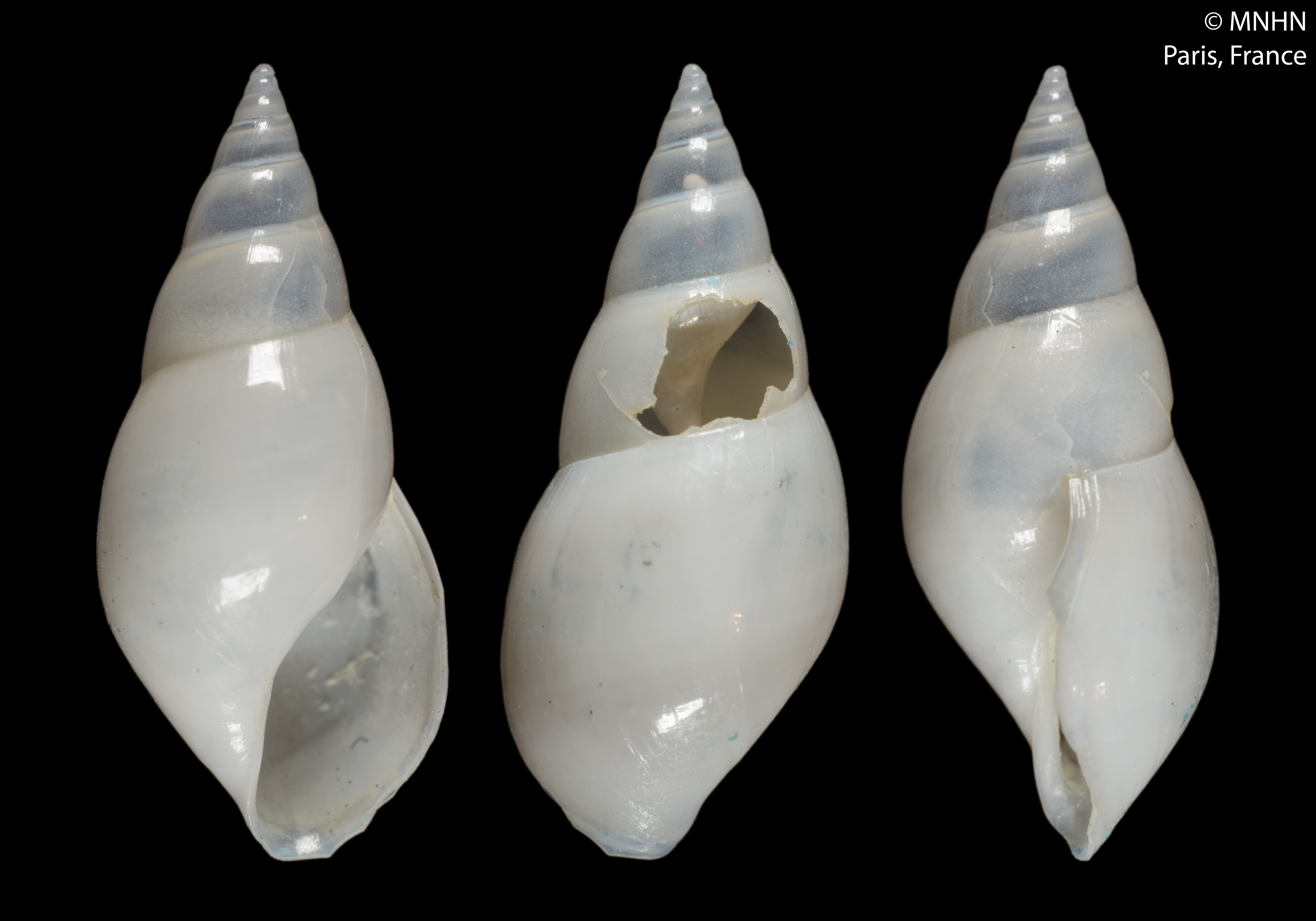
- Shell of Bulimeulima magna (holotype at MNHN, Paris)

Scientific classification
- Kingdom: Animalia
- Phylum: Mollusca
- Class: Gastropoda
- Subclass: Caenogastropoda
- Order: Littorinimorpha
- Superfamily: Vanikoroidea
- Family: Eulimidae
- Genus: Bulimeulima; Bouchet & Warén, 1986

= Bulimeulima =

Genus of gastropods

Bulimeulima is a genus of medium-sized sea snails, marine gastropod mollusks in the family Eulimidae.

== Species ==
There are only two known species to exist within this genus of gastropods, these include the following:

- Bulimeulima incolorata (Thiele, 1912)
- † Bulimeulima lentocontracta (Laws, 1941)
- Bulimeulima magna (Bouchet & Warén, 1986)
- † Bulimeulima rhopaloides P. A. Maxwell, 1992
