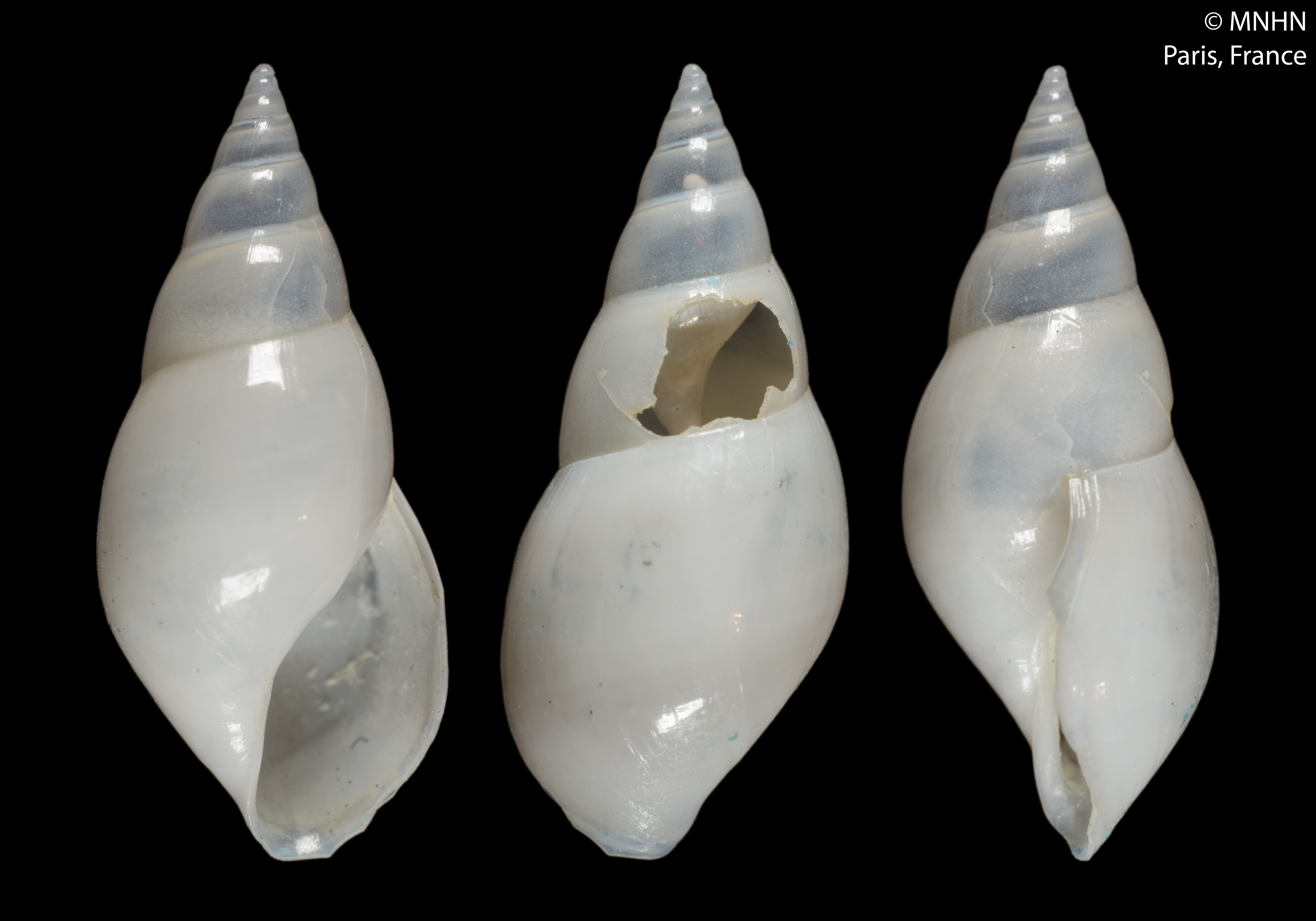
- Shell of Bulimeulima magna (holotype at MNHN, Paris)

Scientific classification
- Kingdom: Animalia
- Phylum: Mollusca
- Class: Gastropoda
- Subclass: Caenogastropoda
- Order: Littorinimorpha
- Family: Eulimidae
- Genus: Bulimeulima
- Species: B. magna

Binomial name
- Bulimeulima magna Bouchet & Warén, 1986

= Bulimeulima magna =

Species of gastropod

Bulimeulima magna is a species of medium-sized sea snail, a marine gastropod mollusk in the family Eulimidae. The species is one of two known species to exist within the genus Bulimeulima; the other congener is Bulimeulima incolorata.
