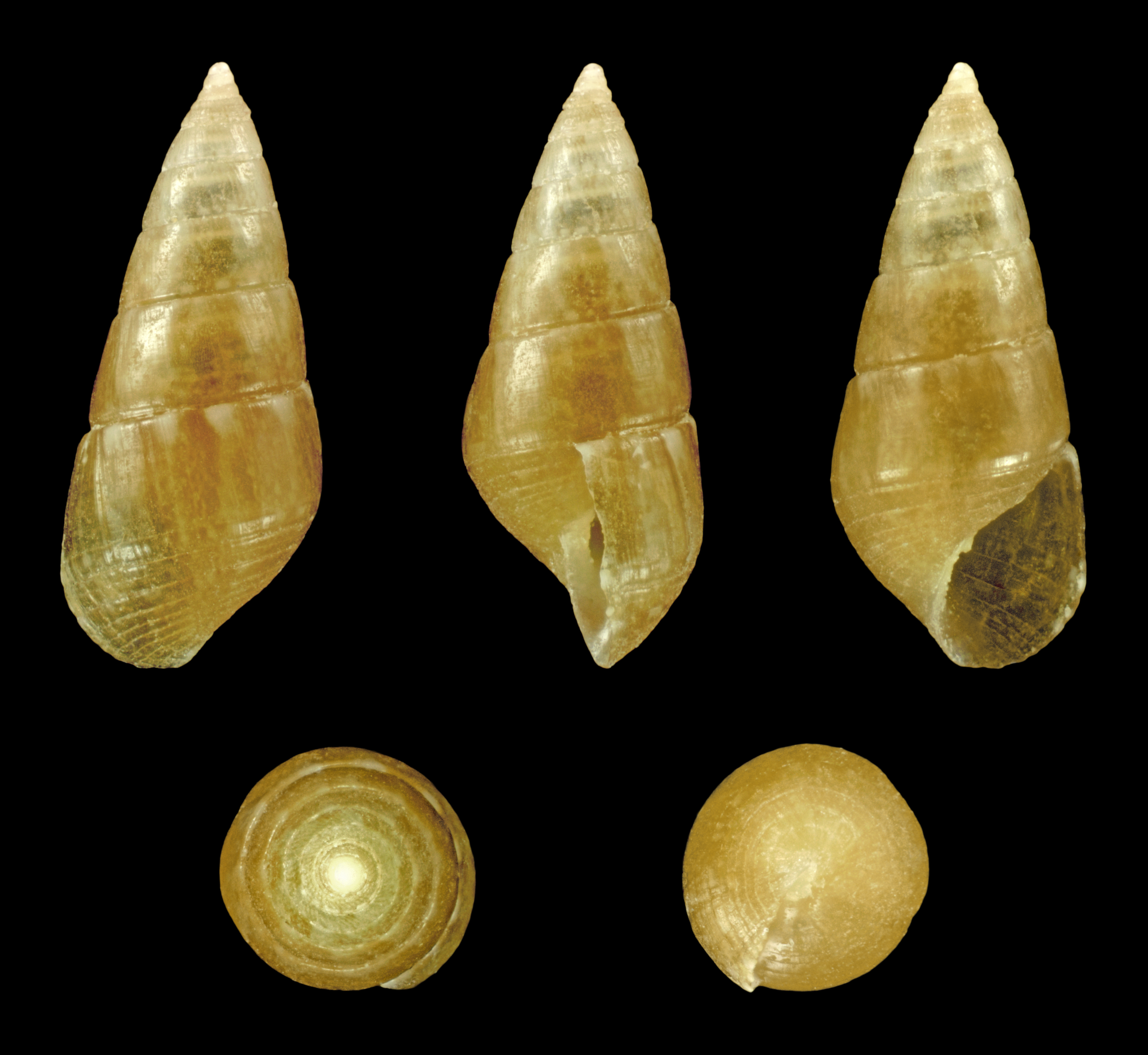

Scientific classification
- Kingdom: Animalia
- Phylum: Mollusca
- Class: Gastropoda
- Subclass: Caenogastropoda
- Order: incertae sedis
- Family: Dialidae
- Genus: Diala
- Species: D. semistriata

Binomial name
- Diala semistriata (Philippi, 1849)

Synonyms
- Alaba semistriata (Philippi, 1849); Barleeia imbricata R. B. Watson, 1886; Ceratia variegata Tapparone-Canefri, 1877; Diala cacumenata C. F. Laseron, 1956; Diala conica H. W. Turton, 1932; Diala infrasulcata G. B. Sowerby III, 1892; Diala planalba C. F. Laseron, 1956; Diala polita H. B. Preston, 1905; Diala varia A. Adams, 1861; Diala vestigia C. F. Laseron, 1956; Diala watsoni C. F. Laseron, 1956

= Diala semistriata =

Species of gastropod

Diala semistriata is a species of sea snail, a marine gastropod mollusk in the family Dialidae.

== Description ==
The shell size varies between 1.9 mm and 4.5 mm.

== Distribution ==
This species is distributed in the Indian Ocean along South Africa, Aldabra Atoll and Madagascar, in the Western Pacific Ocean, in the Red Sea and in the Mediterranean Sea.
