= Alaba cornea =

Scientific classification
- Kingdom: Animalia
- Phylum: Mollusca
- Class: Gastropoda
- Subclass: Caenogastropoda
- Order: incertae sedis
- Family: Litiopidae
- Genus: Alaba
- Species: A. cornea

Binomial name
- Alaba cornea (A. Adams, 1861)

Synonyms
- Diala cornea A. Adams, 1861 (original combination

Species of gastropod

Alaba cornea is a species of sea snail, a marine gastropod mollusk in the family Litiopidae.

== Description ==
(Original description in Latin) The shell is ovate-conical and semi-opaque with a horny texture. It features fine transverse striations and has 4½ convex whorls with rufescent sutures. The apex is tinged with a rufous color. The aperture is oblong, and the columella is straight and colored red. The lips are often tinted with red as well.

== Distribution ==
This marine species occurs off China.
