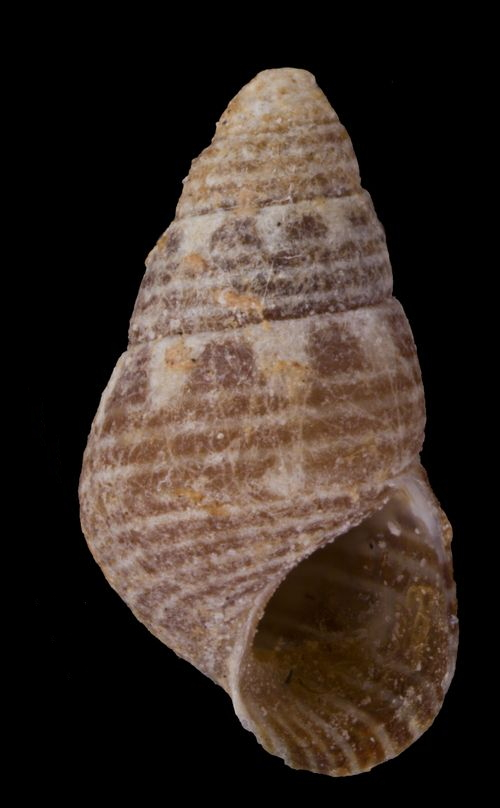
- Shell of Alaba fragilis

Scientific classification
- Kingdom: Animalia
- Phylum: Mollusca
- Class: Gastropoda
- Subclass: Caenogastropoda
- Order: incertae sedis
- Family: Litiopidae
- Genus: Alaba
- Species: A. fragilis

Binomial name
- Alaba fragilis (Thiele, 1930)

Synonyms
- Diala fragilis Thiele, 1930 (original combination); Styliferina fragilis (Thiele, 1930)

= Alaba fragilis =

Species of gastropod

Alaba fragilis is a species of sea snail, a marine gastropod mollusk in the family Litiopidae.

== Distribution ==
This marine species is endemic to Australia and occurs off Western Australia.
