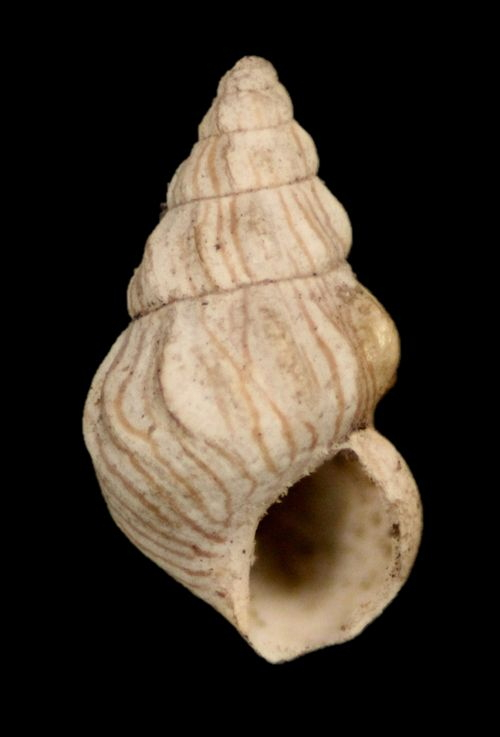
- Shell of Alaba pinnae (specimen at Naturalis Biodiversity Center)

Scientific classification
- Kingdom: Animalia
- Phylum: Mollusca
- Class: Gastropoda
- Subclass: Caenogastropoda
- Order: incertae sedis
- Family: Litiopidae
- Genus: Alaba
- Species: A. pinnae

Binomial name
- Alaba pinnae (Krauss, 1848)

Synonyms
- Diala capensis G. B. Sowerby III, 1889 · unaccepted; Diala pinnae (Krauss, 1848); Rissoa pinnae Krauss, 1848 (original combination)

= Alaba pinnae =

Species of gastropod

Alaba pinnae is a species of sea snail, a marine gastropod mollusk in the family Litiopidae.

== Description ==
(Described as Diala capensis) The shell is elongated and narrow with a whitish hue and a spiraled spire. It has 10 whorls that increase gradually in size, featuring convex surfaces and angled longitudinal ribs that diminish above and below. The suture is clearly defined and slightly protruding. The body whorl is faintly lirate below the middle, and the aperture is oval in shape.

== Distribution ==
This marine species occurs off the South African coast.
