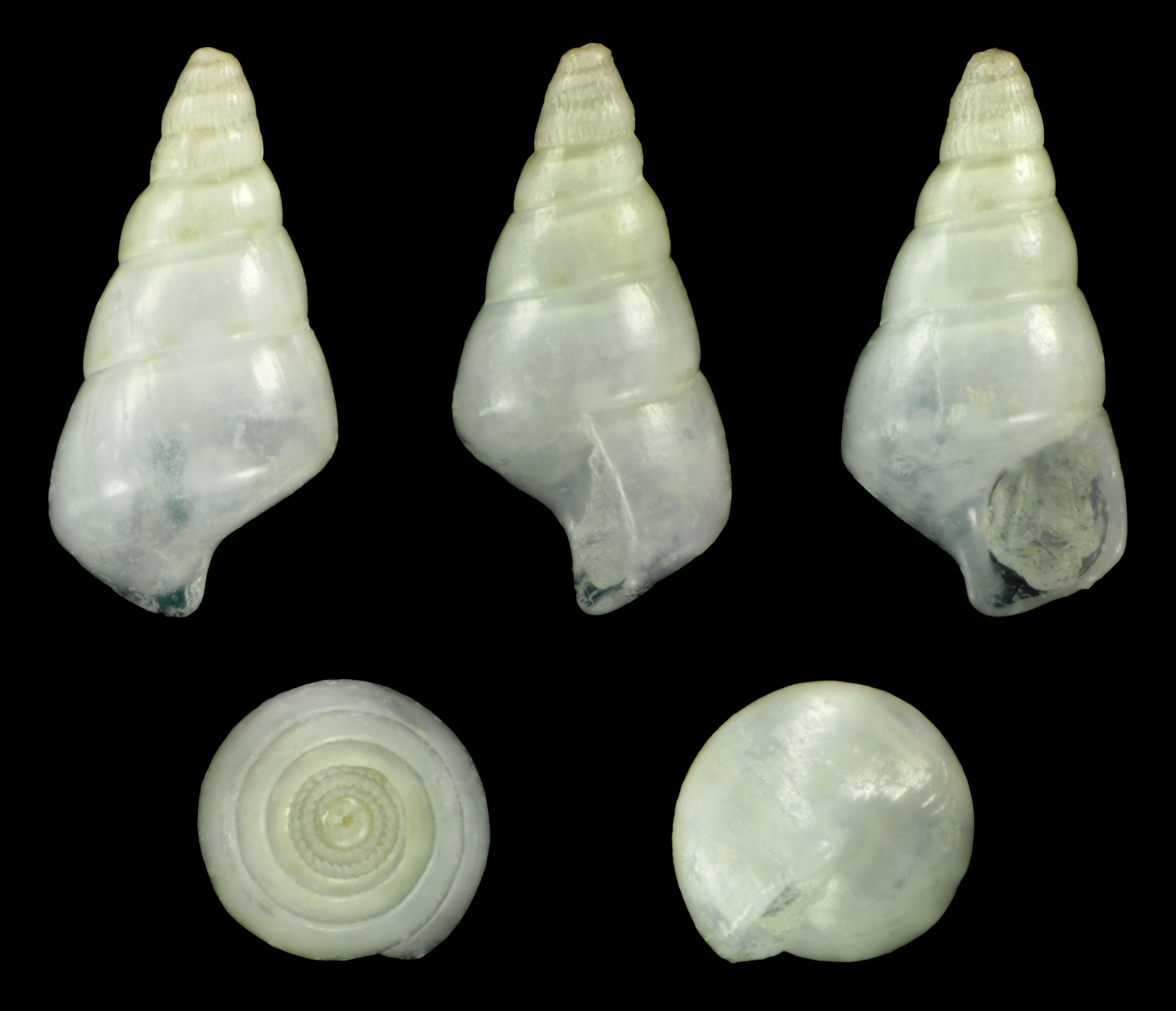
- Litiopa melanostoma sea snail (Rang, 1829), juvenile shell, originally from Puerto Rico

Scientific classification
- Kingdom: Animalia
- Phylum: Mollusca
- Class: Gastropoda
- Subclass: Caenogastropoda
- Order: incertae sedis
- Family: Litiopidae
- Genus: Litiopa
- Species: L. melanostoma

Binomial name
- Litiopa melanostoma (Rang, 1829)

Synonyms
- Abaconia naufraga (Clench, 1938); Bombyxinus uva Bélanger in Lesson, 1831; Buccinum litiopa Quoy & Gaimard, 1833; Litiopa bombix Kiener, 1833; Litiopa decussata Gould, 1852; Litiopa divisa Carpenter, 1855; Litiopa grateloupeana Drouet, 1858; Litiopa maculata Rang, 1829; Litiopa nitidula Pfeiffer, 1840; Litiopa striata Pfeiffer, 1840

= Litiopa melanostoma =

Species of gastropod

Litiopa melanostoma, common name the brown Sargassum shell, is a species of very small sea snail, a marine gastropod mollusk or micromollusk in the family Litiopidae.

== Distribution ==
This species occurs in the Gulf of Mexico, the Caribbean Sea, the Lesser Antilles, Puerto Rico and off the Azores; in the North Atlantic Ocean, off Newfoundland.

== Description ==
Litiopa melanostoma (Sargassum Snail) has been found to have a maximum recorded shell length of 6 mm.

== Habitat ==
The minimum recorded depth for this species is 0 m; the maximum recorded depth is 805 m. The snail is known to live on floating beds of Sargassum.
