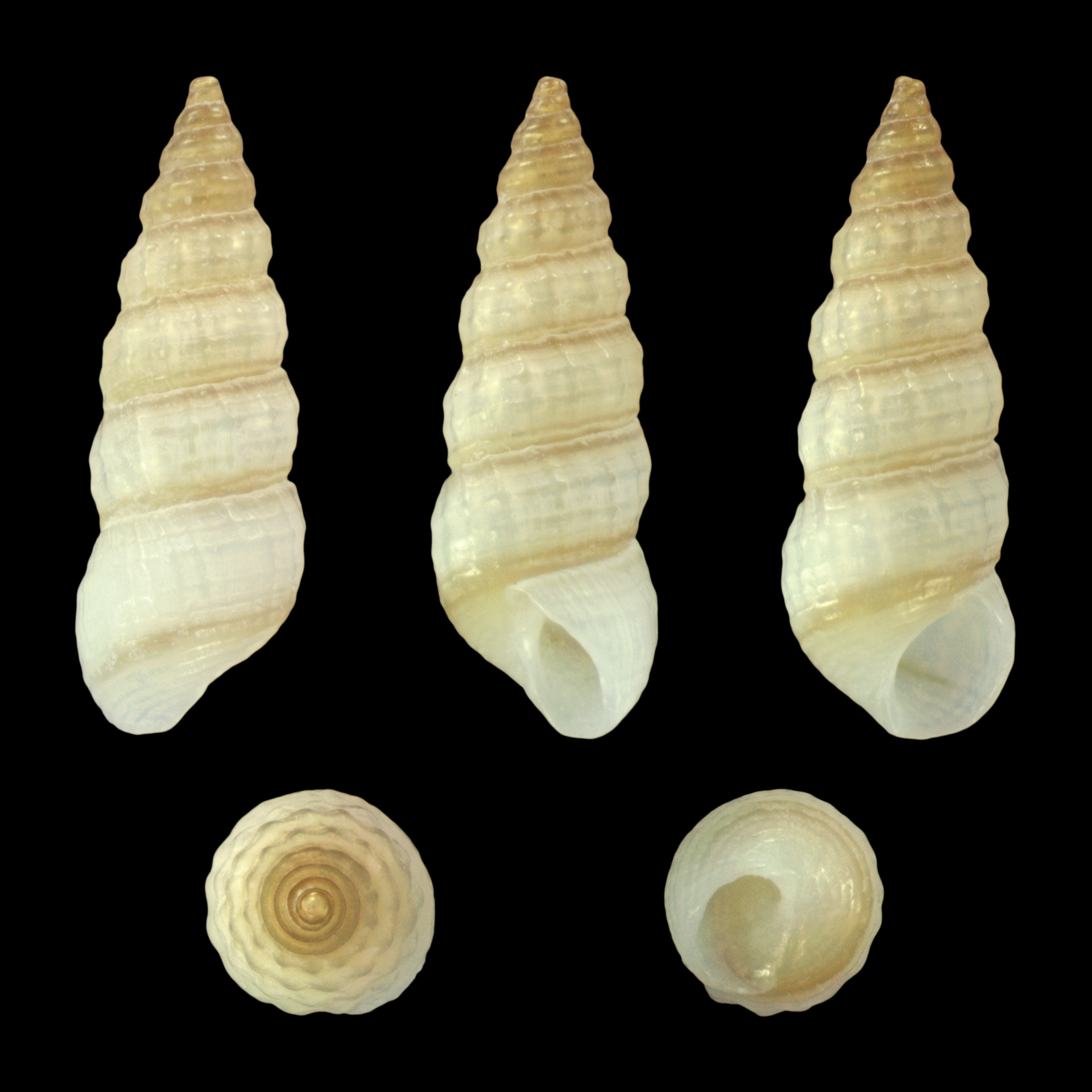

Scientific classification
- Kingdom: Animalia
- Phylum: Mollusca
- Class: Gastropoda
- Subclass: Caenogastropoda
- Order: incertae sedis
- Family: Scaliolidae
- Genus: Finella
- Species: F. rufocincta

Binomial name
- Finella rufocincta (A. Adams, 1861)

Synonyms
- Alaba fulva Watson, 1886; Dunkeria rufocincta A. Adams, 1861 (basionym); Eufenella subpellucida Kuroda & Habe, 1961; Finella fulva (Watson, 1886); Obtortio fulva (Watson, 1886)

= Finella rufocincta =

Species of gastropod

Finella rufocincta is a species of sea snail, a marine gastropod mollusk in the family Scaliolidae.

== Distribution ==
This marine species occurs off Madagascar.
