= Bulimeulima incolorata =

Scientific classification
- Kingdom: Animalia
- Phylum: Mollusca
- Class: Gastropoda
- Subclass: Caenogastropoda
- Order: Littorinimorpha
- Family: Eulimidae
- Genus: Bulimeulima
- Species: B. incolorata

Binomial name
- Bulimeulima incolorata Thiele, 1912

Synonyms
- Alaba incolorata Thiele, 1912

Species of gastropod

Bulimeulima incolorata is a species of medium-sized sea snail, a marine gastropod mollusk in the family Eulimidae. The species is one of two known species to exist within the genus Bulimeulima; the other congener is Bulimeulima magna.

== Distribution ==
This marine species of gastropod is found in Antarctic waters.
