= Gibborissoia virgata =

Scientific classification
- Kingdom: Animalia
- Phylum: Mollusca
- Class: Gastropoda
- Subclass: Caenogastropoda
- Order: incertae sedis
- Family: Litiopidae
- Genus: Gibborissoia
- Species: G. virgata

Binomial name
- Gibborissoia virgata (Philippi, 1849)

Synonyms
- List: Alaba mirabilis (Hornung & Mermod, 1926); Apicularia (Thapsiella) stricta F. Nordsieck, 1972; Apicularia stricta F. Nordsieck, 1972; Fenella virgata (Philippi, 1849); Gibborissoa mirabilis Hornung & Mermod, 1926; Gibborissoa virgata (Philippi, 1849); Gibborissoia mirabilis Hornung & Mermod, 1926; Rissoa virgata Philippi, 1849

Species of gastropod

Gibborissoia virgata is a species of sea snail, a marine gastropod mollusk in the family Litiopidae.

== Distribution ==
This species is found in the Mediterranean Sea, the Red Sea and in the Indian Ocean along Madagascar.
