= Dalliella =

Scientific classification
- Kingdom: Animalia
- Phylum: Mollusca
- Class: Gastropoda
- Subclass: Caenogastropoda
- Order: incertae sedis
- Family: Litiopidae
- Genus: †Dalliella; Cossmann, 1895

Extinct genus of sea snails

Dalliella is an extinct genus of gastropods belonging to the family Litiopidae.

The species of this genus are found in Southern France.

Species:

- Dalliella brusinai Cossmann, 1895
- Dalliella elisae Pacaud, 2019
- Dalliella neozelanica Laws, 1944
- Dalliella prisca (Oppenheim, 1906)
