= Pseudosabinella =

- Shell of Pseudosabinella bakeri (holotype at Smithsonian Institution, National Museum of Natural History)

Scientific classification
- Kingdom: Animalia
- Phylum: Mollusca
- Class: Gastropoda
- Subclass: Caenogastropoda
- Order: Littorinimorpha
- Superfamily: Vanikoroidea
- Family: Eulimidae
- Genus: Pseudosabinella; McLean, 1995
- Species: P. bakeri

Binomial name
- Pseudosabinella bakeri (Bartsch, 1917)

Synonyms
- Sabinella bakeri Bartsch, 1917; Alaba catalinensis Bartsch, 1920; Alaba serrana Smith & Gordon, 1948; Melanella bakeri (Bartsch, 1917); Oceanida catalinensis (Bartsch, 1920); Sabinella bakeri Bartsch, 1917

Genus of gastropods

Pseudosabinella is a genus of very small ectoparasitic sea snails, marine gastropod mollusks or micromollusks in the family Eulimidae, containing a single species Pseudosabinella bakeri.

== Description ==
The length of the shell attains 2.7 mm, its diameter 1.1 mm.

(Original description) The small shell is very broadly conic, and creamy-white in color. All of the whorls are moderately rounded, excepting the last whorl, which is very strongly rounded. The shell contains nine whorls. All whorls are marked by rather prominent lines of growth and rather numerous, irregularly disposed varices, of which there are sometimes several to a single whorl. The suture is moderately constricted. The periphery of the body whorl is inflated and strongly rounded. The base is short, strongly rounded, and marked like the spire. The aperture is very large; the posterior angle is acute; the outer lip is thin at the edge, decidedly produced, and protracted in the middle to form a strong, claw-like element; the inner lip is slender, slightly curved, somewhat revolute, and free for its entire length; and the parietal wall is glazed by a thin callus.

== Distribution ==
This species occurs in the Pacific Ocean off California, USA, Mexico, Panama and Ecuador.
