= Mirabilis =

Mirabilis is a Latin adjective meaning "amazing, wondrous, remarkable", and is used to refer to:

- RV Mirabilis, a ship
- Mirabilis (album), album by British vocal group Mediaeval Baebes
- Mirabilis (band), an ethereal/neo-classical band
- Mirabilis (company), an internet company, owned by Digital Sky Technologies, that produced ICQ
- Mirabilis (novel), a novel by Susann Cokal
- Mirabilis (plant), a genus of herbaceous perennial plants
