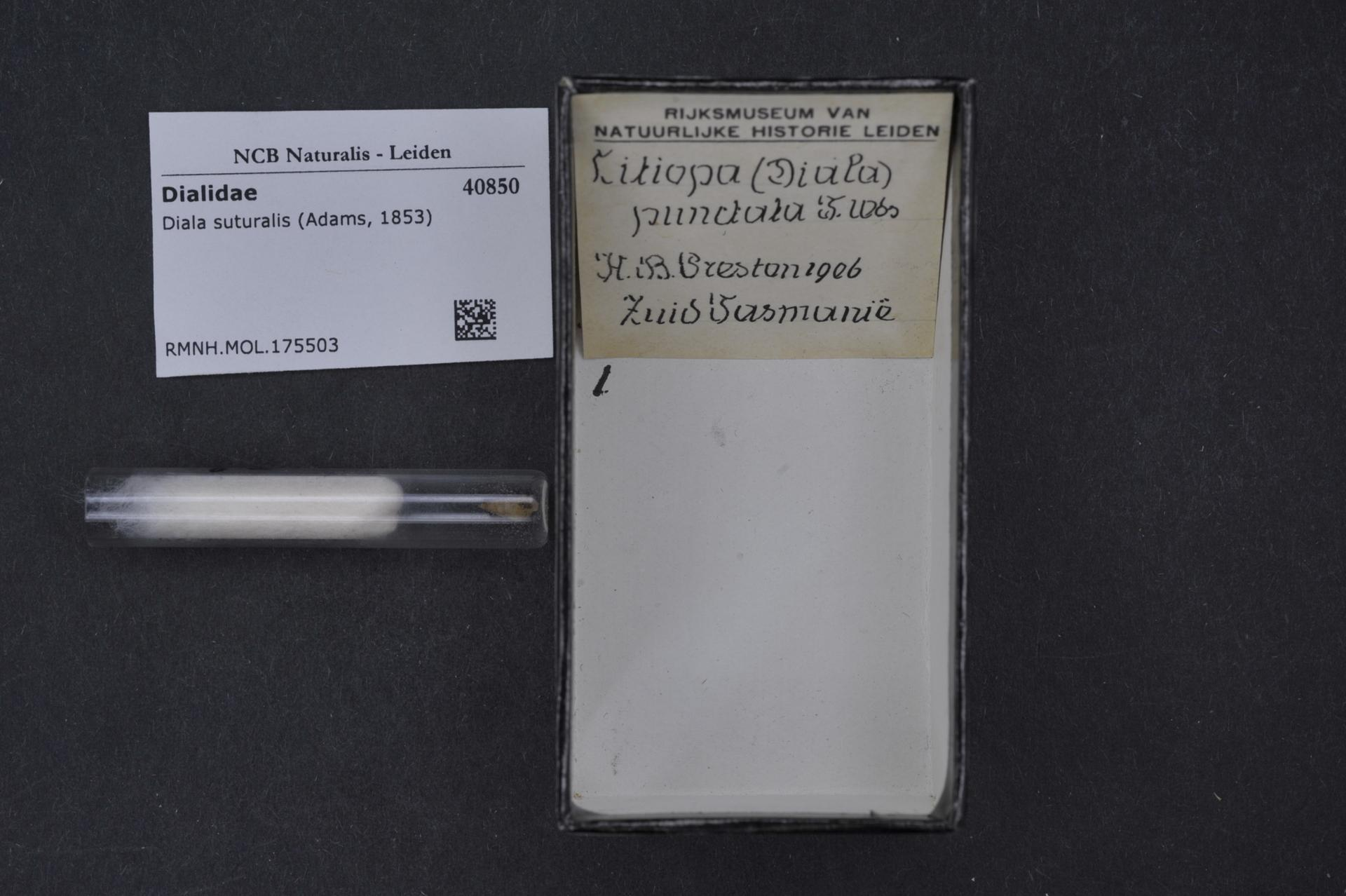
- Diala suturalis (Adams, 1853)

Scientific classification
- Kingdom: Animalia
- Phylum: Mollusca
- Class: Gastropoda
- Subclass: Caenogastropoda
- Order: incertae sedis
- Superfamily: Cerithioidea
- Family: Dialidae; E. A. Kay, 1979

Diversity
- 8 extant species

= Dialidae =

Family of gastropods

Dialidae, common name dialids, is a family of sea snails, marine gastropod molluscs in the superfamily Cerithioidea .

According to the taxonomy of the Gastropoda by Bouchet & Rocroi (2005), the family Dialidae has no subfamilies.

== Genera ==
Genus within the family Dialidae include:

- Diala A. Adams, 1861 - type genus of the family Dialidae, synonym: Laevitesta Laseron, 1950
- † Glosia Cossmann, 1921: extinct genus that belongs to the Neotaenioglossa
- Mellitestea Laseron, 1956
- Paradiala Laseron, 1956
- † Rissoalaba Oyama, 1954
