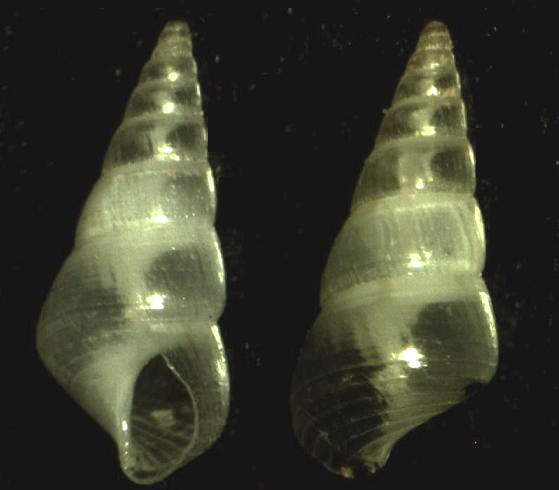
- Alaba incerta

Scientific classification
- Kingdom: Animalia
- Phylum: Mollusca
- Class: Gastropoda
- Subclass: Caenogastropoda
- Order: incertae sedis
- Superfamily: Cerithioidea
- Family: Litiopidae; J. E. Gray, 1847

Diversity
- 16–18 extant species

= Litiopidae =

Litiopidae Temporal range: Cretaceous–Recent

Family of gastropods

Litiopidae, common name litiopids, is a family of small sea snails, marine gastropod molluscs in the clade Sorbeoconcha.

According to the taxonomy of the Gastropoda by Bouchet & Rocroi (2005) the family Litiopidae has no subfamilies.

== Genera ==
Genera within the family Litiopidae include:

- Alaba H. Adams & A. Adams, 1853
- † Dalliella Cossmann, 1895
- Diffalaba Iredale, 1936
- Gibborissoia Sacco, 1895
- † Ipunina Nielsen & Frassinetti, 2008
- Litiopa Rang, 1829 - the type genus of the family Litiopidae
  - Litiopa melanostoma (Rang, 1829)
- † Litiopella Bandel & Kiel, 2000
  - Litiopella schoeningi Bandel & Kiel, 2000 - from Cretaceous
- Obstopalia Iredale, 1936
- Styliferina Adams, 1860

Genera brought into synonymy

- Abaconia Clench, 1938: synonym of Litiopa Rang, 1829
- Australaba Laseron, 1956: synonym of Alaba H. Adams & A. Adams, 1853
- Bombyxinus Bélanger in Lesson, 1834: synonym of Litiopa Rang, 1829
- Dialessa Iredale, 1955: synonym of Styliferina A. Adams, 1860
- Gibborissoa Cossmann, 1921: synonym of Gibborissoia Sacco, 1895
- Macertexta Laseron, 1955: synonym of Styliferina A. Adams, 1860
- Pseudobittium Dautzenberg, 1890: synonym of Alaba H. Adams & A. Adams, 1853
- Touzinia Cossmann, 1916 †: synonym of Gibborissoia Sacco, 1895
