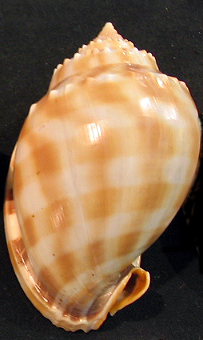
- Dorsal view of a shell of Phalium bandatum

Scientific classification
- Domain: Eukaryota
- Kingdom: Animalia
- Phylum: Mollusca
- Class: Gastropoda
- Order: Neotaenioglossa

Synonyms
- Cerithioidea Férussac, 1819

= Neotaenioglossa =

Neotaenioglossa Temporal range: Late Pleistocene to Recent

Group of molluscs

The Neotaenioglossa is a taxonomic name for a large group of mostly sea snails. The name was originally created by Haller in 1882. Ponder and Warén (1988), and Marquet (1997), assigned this name to the superorder Caenogastropoda. ITIS considers the order Neotaenioglossa to be a synonym of Cerithioidea Férussac, 1819 .

The taxonomy of the Gastropoda (Bouchet & Rocroi, 2005) no longer used this name. All families were assigned to the clades Littorinimorpha, Neogastropoda and to the informal group Ptenoglossa, all within the clade Hypsogastropoda.

== Families ==
List of families in the order Neotaenioglossa:

- Aclididae G.O. Sars, 1878
- Amnicolidae Tryon, 1863
- Annulariidae
- Aporrhaididae
- Assimineidae H. and A. Adams, 1856
- Atlantidae Wiegmann and Ruthe, 1832
- Barleeiidae
- Batillariidae
- Bithyniidae
- Bursidae Thiele, 1925
- Caecidae Gray, 1815
- Calyptraeidae Blainville, 1824
- Capulidae Fleming, 1822
- Carinariidae Blainville, 1818
- Cassidae Latreille, 1825
- Cerithiidae Fleming, 1822
- Cerithiopsidae H. and A. Adams, 1854
- Cypraeidae Rafinesque, 1815
- Elachisinidae
- Epitoniidae S.S. Berry, 1910
- Eulimidae
- Falsicingulidae
- Ficidae Conrad, 1867
- Haloceratidae
- Hipponicidae Troschel, 1861
- Hydrobiidae Simpson, 1865
- Janthinidae Leach, 1823
- Lamellariidae Orbigny, 1841
- Lithoglyphidae Tryon, 1866
- Litiopidae
- Littorinidae Gray, 1840
- Modulidae
- Naticidae Guilding, 1834
- Obtortionidae
- Ovulidae Fleming, 1822
- Pelycidiidae
- Personidae
- Pickworthiidae
- Planaxidae Gray, 1850
- Pleuroceridae
- Potamididae H. and A. Adams, 1854
- Pterotracheidae Gray, 1840
- Ranellidae Gray, 1854
- Rissoidae Gray, 1847
- Semisulcospiridae Morrison, 1952
- Siliquariidae Anton, 1839
- Skeneopsidae Iredale, 1915
- Strombidae Rafinesque, 1815
- Tateidae Thiele, 1925
- Thiaridae
- Tonnidae Peile, 1926
- Tornidae
- Triphoridae Gray, 1847
- Triviidae Trochel, 1863
- Truncatellidae Gray, 1840
- Turritellidae Clarke, 1851
- Vanikoridae Gray, 1845
- Velutinidae Gray, 1840
- Vermetidae Rafinesque, 1815
- Vitrinellidae Bush, 1897
- Xenophoridae Philippi, 1853
