= Finella adamsi =

Scientific classification
- Kingdom: Animalia
- Phylum: Mollusca
- Class: Gastropoda
- Subclass: Caenogastropoda
- Order: incertae sedis
- Family: Scaliolidae
- Genus: Finella
- Species: F. adamsi

Binomial name
- Finella adamsi (Dall, 1889)

Species of gastropod

Finella adamsi is a species of sea snail, a marine gastropod mollusc in the family Obtortionidae.

== Description ==
The maximum recorded shell length is 4.6 mm.

The structure is similar to a cone. With typically five grooves.

== Habitat ==
They are recorded to be living at the depth ranging from 0 to 30m
