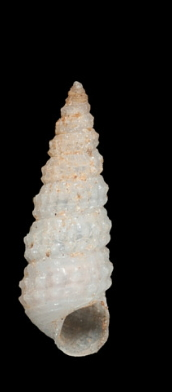
- Shell of Finella phanea (spêcimen at the Smithsonian Institution)

Scientific classification
- Kingdom: Animalia
- Phylum: Mollusca
- Class: Gastropoda
- Subclass: Caenogastropoda
- Order: incertae sedis
- Family: Scaliolidae
- Genus: Finella; A. Adams, 1860

Type species
- Finella pupoides A. Adams, 1860

Synonyms
- Obtortio Hedley, 1899; Alabina Dall, 1902; Eufenella Kuroda & Habe, 1954; Fenella A. Adams, 1864; Fesandella Gründel, 1976; Truidella Gründel, 1976

= Finella =

Genus of gastropods

Finella is a genus of sea snails, marine gastropod mollusks in the family Scaliolidae.

This genus has been assigned in the course of time to different families by different authors: Rissoidae, Cerithiidae, Dialidae, Obtortionidae, Finellidae and Diastomatidae Morphological and anatomical studies by Winston Ponder in 1994 established that the genera Finella and Scaliola didn't belong in the above-mentioned families and he brought them in a new family Scaliolidae. This was supported in 1982 by Healy through the study of the ultrastructure on the spermatozoa.

== Description ==
The species in this genus contain a small, elongated, conical shell without siphonal canal. The axial to spiral sculpture varies between weak and strong.

== Distribution ==
The snails of this species are common to even abundant in shallow waters of the tropical Indo-West Pacific Ocean.

== Species ==
Species within the genus Finella include:

- Finella adamsi (Dall, 1889)
- Finella barbarensis (Bartsch, 1911)
- Finella californica (Dall & Bartsch, 1901)
- Finella dubia (d'Orbigny, 1840)
- Finella geayi Lamy, 1910
- Finella hamlini (Bartsch, 1911)
- Finella io (Bartsch, 1911)
- Finella longinqua (Haas, 1949)
- Finella phanea (Bartsch, 1911)
- Finella portoricana (Dall & Simpson, 1901)
- Finella pupoides Adams A., 1860
- Finella tenuisculpta (Carpenter, 1864)
