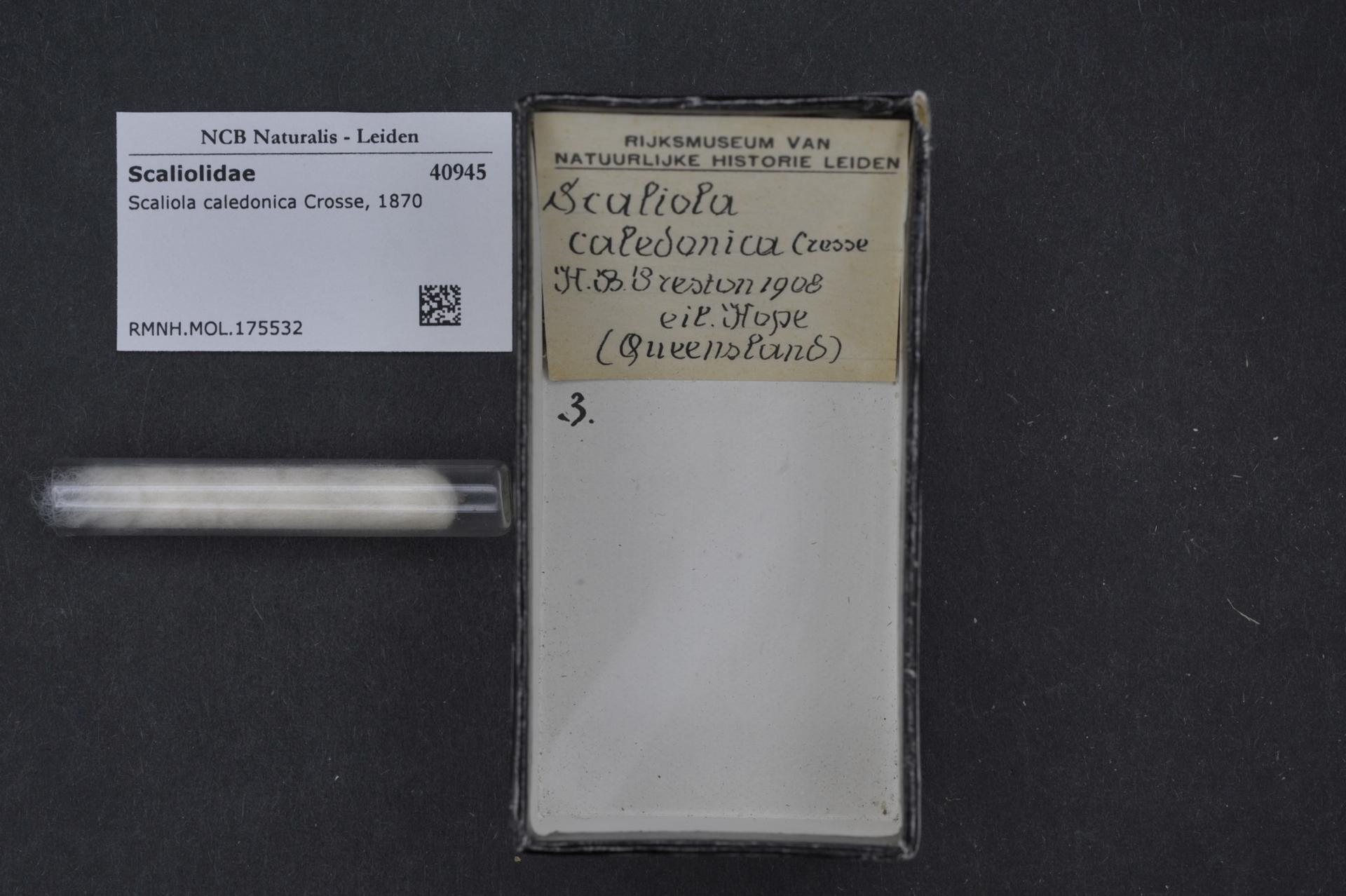

Scientific classification
- Kingdom: Animalia
- Phylum: Mollusca
- Class: Gastropoda
- Subclass: Caenogastropoda
- Order: incertae sedis
- Family: Scaliolidae
- Genus: Scaliola
- Species: S. caledonica

Binomial name
- Scaliola caledonica Crosse, 1870

= Scaliola caledonica =

Species of gastropod

Scaliola caledonica is a species of sea snail, a marine gastropod mollusk in the family Scaliolidae.
