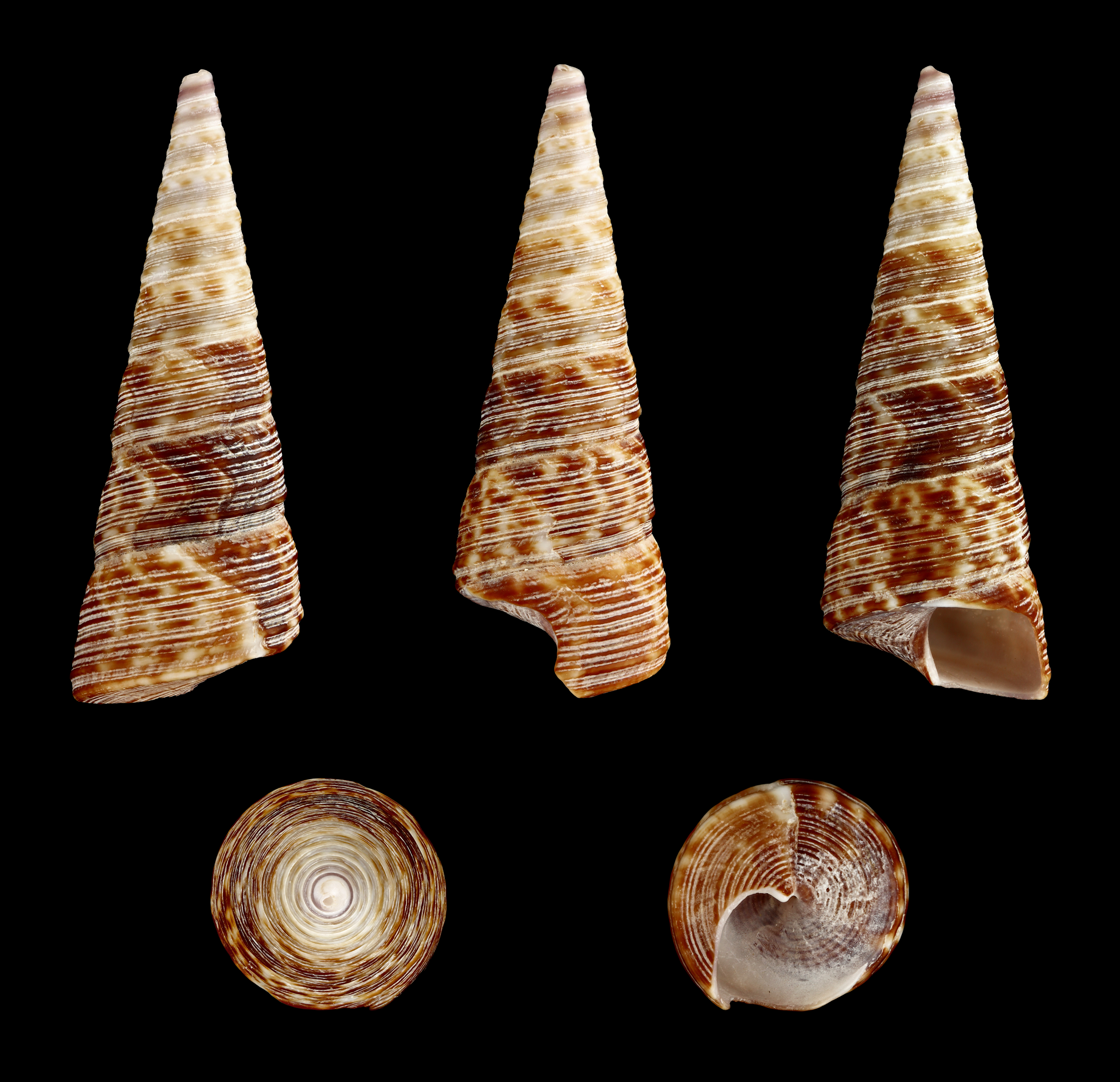
- A shell of Maoricolpus roseus roseus

Scientific classification
- Domain: Eukaryota
- Kingdom: Animalia
- Phylum: Mollusca
- Class: Gastropoda
- Subclass: Caenogastropoda
- Superfamily: Cerithioidea
- Family: Turritellidae
- Genus: Maoricolpus; Finlay, 1927

Type species
- Turritella rosea Quoy & Gaimard, 1834

Synonyms
- Turritella (Maoricolpus) Finlay, 1926

= Maoricolpus =

Genus of gastropods

Maoricolpus, common name the "New Zealand screw shells", is a genus of sea snails, marine gastropod molluscs in the family Turritellidae, the Turritella snails.

This genus is found in New Zealand and Australia.

== Species and subspecies ==
Species and subspecies in the genus Maoricolpus include:

- † Maoricolpus doni Marwick, 1971
- Maoricolpus finlayi Powell, 1940
- † Maoricolpus horni Marwick, 1971
- † Maoricolpus ongleyi Marwick, 1931
- Maoricolpus roseus (Quoy and Gaimard, 1834)
  - Subspecies Maoricolpus roseus manukauensis Powell, 1931
- † Maoricolpus solomoni (Marwick, 1928)
- † Maoricolpus waitemataensis (Powell & Bartrum, 1929)

Species brought into synonymy

- † Maoricolpus proroseus Marwick, 1931: synonym of Maoricolpus roseus (Quoy & Gaimard, 1834)
