= Maoraxidae =

Scientific classification
- Kingdom: Animalia
- Phylum: Mollusca
- Class: Gastropoda
- Subclass: Caenogastropoda
- Order: incertae sedis
- Superfamily: Cerithioidea
- Family: †Maoraxidae; Bandel, Gründel & Maxwell, 2000

Extinct family of gastropods

Maoraxidae is an extinct family of snails, gastropod molluscs in the clade Sorbeoconcha.

According to the taxonomy of the Gastropoda by Bouchet & Rocroi (2005) the family Maoraxidae has no subfamilies.

== Genera ==
- † Maoraxis Bandel, Gründel, Maxwell, 2000 - type genus
  - † Maoraxis kieli Bandel, Gründel, Maxwell, 2000
