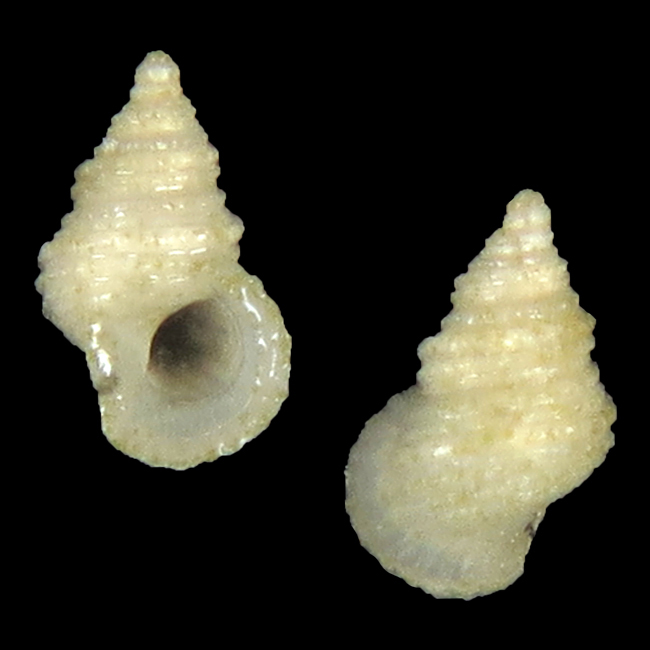

Scientific classification
- Kingdom: Animalia
- Phylum: Mollusca
- Class: Gastropoda
- Subclass: Caenogastropoda
- Order: incertae sedis
- Family: Pickworthiidae
- Genus: Ampullosansonia
- Species: A. renephilippei

Binomial name
- Ampullosansonia renephilippei Poppe, Tagaro & Goto, 2018

= Ampullosansonia renephilippei =

Species of gastropod

Ampullosansonia renephilippei is a species of sea snail, a marine gastropod mollusk in the family Pickworthiidae.

== Original description ==
- Poppe G.T., Tagaro S.P. & Goto Y. (2018). New marine species from the Central Philippines. Visaya. 5(1): 91-135. page(s): 97, pl. 5 figs 1-2.
