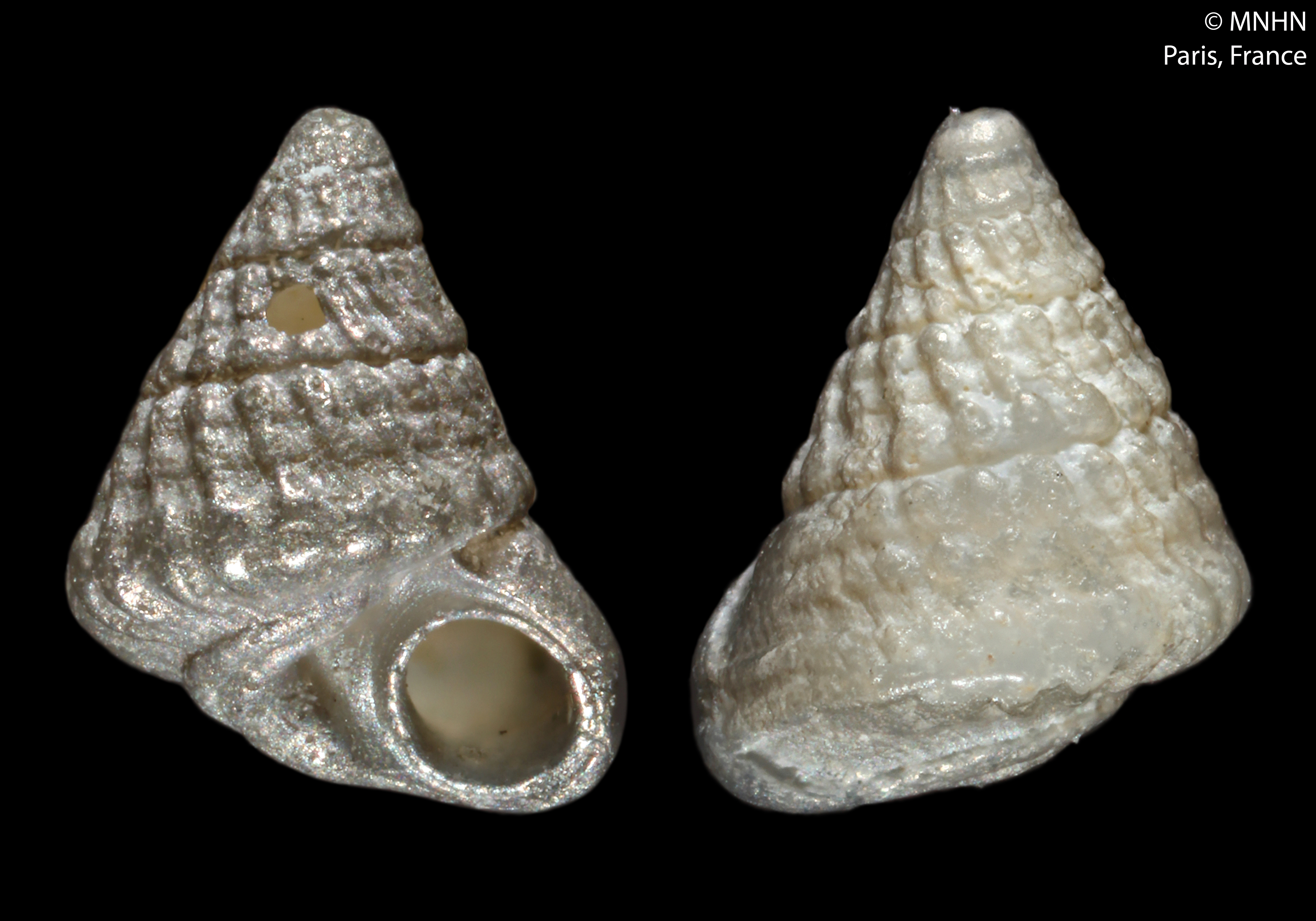
- Shell of Sansonia andamanica (syntype at MNHN, Paris)

Scientific classification
- Kingdom: Animalia
- Phylum: Mollusca
- Class: Gastropoda
- Subclass: Caenogastropoda
- Order: incertae sedis
- Superfamily: Cerithioidea
- Family: Pickworthiidae
- Genus: Sansonia; Jousseaume, 1892

Type species
- Iphitus tuberculatus R. B. Watson, 1886

Synonyms
- Mecoliotia Hedley, 1899; Pickworthia Iredale, 1917

= Sansonia (gastropod) =

Genus of gastropods

Sansonia is a genus of small sea snails, marine gastropod molluscs in the subfamily Pickworthiinae of the family Pickworthiidae.

== General characteristics ==
(Originally described in French) Its form is that of a small trochiform shell with a high spire, thick walls, a circular aperture, and a continuous peristome, externally reinforced by an annular ridge that gives the appearance of a double lip.

== Species ==
- Sansonia alisonae Le Renard & Bouchet, 2003
- Sansonia andamanica (Preston, 1908)
- † Sansonia aturensis Lozouet, 2024
- Sansonia cebuana Bandel & Kowalke, 1997
- Sansonia costata Kase, 1998
- Sansonia halligani (Hedley, 1899)
- † Sansonia hedegaardi Bandel & Kowalke, 1997
- Sansonia hilutangensis Bandel & Kowalke, 1997
- Sansonia iejimensis Kase, 1998
- † Sansonia imperforata Lozouet, 2024
- Sansonia iredalei (Bavay, 1922)
- Sansonia kirkpatricki (Iredale, 1917)
- † Sansonia miocaenica Janssen, 2004 †
- Sansonia nuda Kase, 1998
- † Sansonia orthensis Lozouet, 2024
- † Sansonia schnetleri Lozouet, 2024
- Sansonia shigemitsui Kase, 1998
- Sansonia sumatrensis (Thiele, 1925)
- † Sansonia texana Garvie, 2021
- Sansonia tuberculata (R. B. Watson, 1886)
- Sansonia umbilicata Jousseaume, 1921

Synonyms

- Sansonia andrei Jousseaume, 1921: synonym of Sansonia kirkpatricki (Iredale, 1917)
- Sansonia christinae Selli, 1974: synonym of Sansonia kirkpatricki (Iredale, 1917)
- Sansonia fauroti Jousseaume, 1921: synonym of Sansonia andamanica (Preston, 1908)
- † Sansonia italica Raffi & Taviani, 1985: synonym of Mareleptopoma minor (Almera & Bofill, 1898)
- † Sansonia kenneyi (Ladd, 1966): synonym of † Mareleptopoma kenneyi (Ladd, 1966)
- Sansonia sansonia Jousseaume, 1921: synonym of Sansonia andamanica (Preston, 1908)
- Sansonia semisculpta Espinosa & Fernández-Garcés, 1990: synonym of Cubasansonia semisculpta (Espinosa & Fernández-Garcés, 1990) (original combination)
