= Finella dubia =

Scientific classification
- Kingdom: Animalia
- Phylum: Mollusca
- Class: Gastropoda
- Subclass: Caenogastropoda
- Order: incertae sedis
- Family: Scaliolidae
- Genus: Finella
- Species: F. dubia

Binomial name
- Finella dubia (d'Orbigny, 1840)

Synonyms
- Alabina venezuelana Weisbord, 1962

Species of gastropod

Finella dubia is a species of sea snail, a marine gastropod mollusk in the family Scaliolidae.

== Description ==
The maximum recorded shell length is 4.9 mm.

== Habitat ==
Minimum recorded depth is 0 m. Maximum recorded depth is 805 m.
