= Finella geayi =

Scientific classification
- Kingdom: Animalia
- Phylum: Mollusca
- Class: Gastropoda
- Subclass: Caenogastropoda
- Order: incertae sedis
- Family: Scaliolidae
- Genus: Finella
- Species: F. geayi

Binomial name
- Finella geayi Lamy, 1910

Synonyms
- Fenella geayi

Species of gastropod

Finella geayi is a species of small sea snail, a marine gastropod mollusk or micromollusk in the family Scaliolidae.

== Description ==
The Finella Geayi is a small snail. It lives in brown or white spiral shells. Its body is white and secretes a white mucus substance.
