= Propupaspiridae =

Scientific classification
- Kingdom: Animalia
- Phylum: Mollusca
- Class: Gastropoda
- Subclass: Caenogastropoda
- Order: incertae sedis
- Superfamily: Cerithioidea
- Family: †Propupaspiridae; Nützel, Pan & Erwin, 2002

Extinct family of gastropods

Propupaspiridae is an extinct family of sea snails, marine gastropod molluscs in the clade Sorbeoconcha.

According to the taxonomy of the Gastropoda by Bouchet & Rocroi (2005) the family Propupaspiridae has no subfamilies.
