= Lanascalidae =

Scientific classification
- Kingdom: Animalia
- Phylum: Mollusca
- Class: Gastropoda
- Subclass: Vetigastropoda
- Superfamily: Seguenzioidea
- Family: †Lanascalidae; Bandel, 1992

Extinct family of gastropods

Lanascalidae is an extinct family of sea snails, marine gastropod molluscs.

According to the taxonomy of the Gastropoda by Bouchet & Rocroi (2005) the family Lanascalidae used to be in superfamily Cerithioidea of the clade Sorbeoconcha, and has no subfamilies. It has only one genus.

Since 2018, the family is moved to Seguenzioidea.
