= Scaliola elata =

Scientific classification
- Kingdom: Animalia
- Phylum: Mollusca
- Class: Gastropoda
- Subclass: Caenogastropoda
- Order: incertae sedis
- Family: Scaliolidae
- Genus: Scaliola
- Species: S. elata

Binomial name
- Scaliola elata Issel, 1869

Species of gastropod

Scaliola elata is a species of sea snail, a marine gastropod mollusk in the family Scaliolidae.
