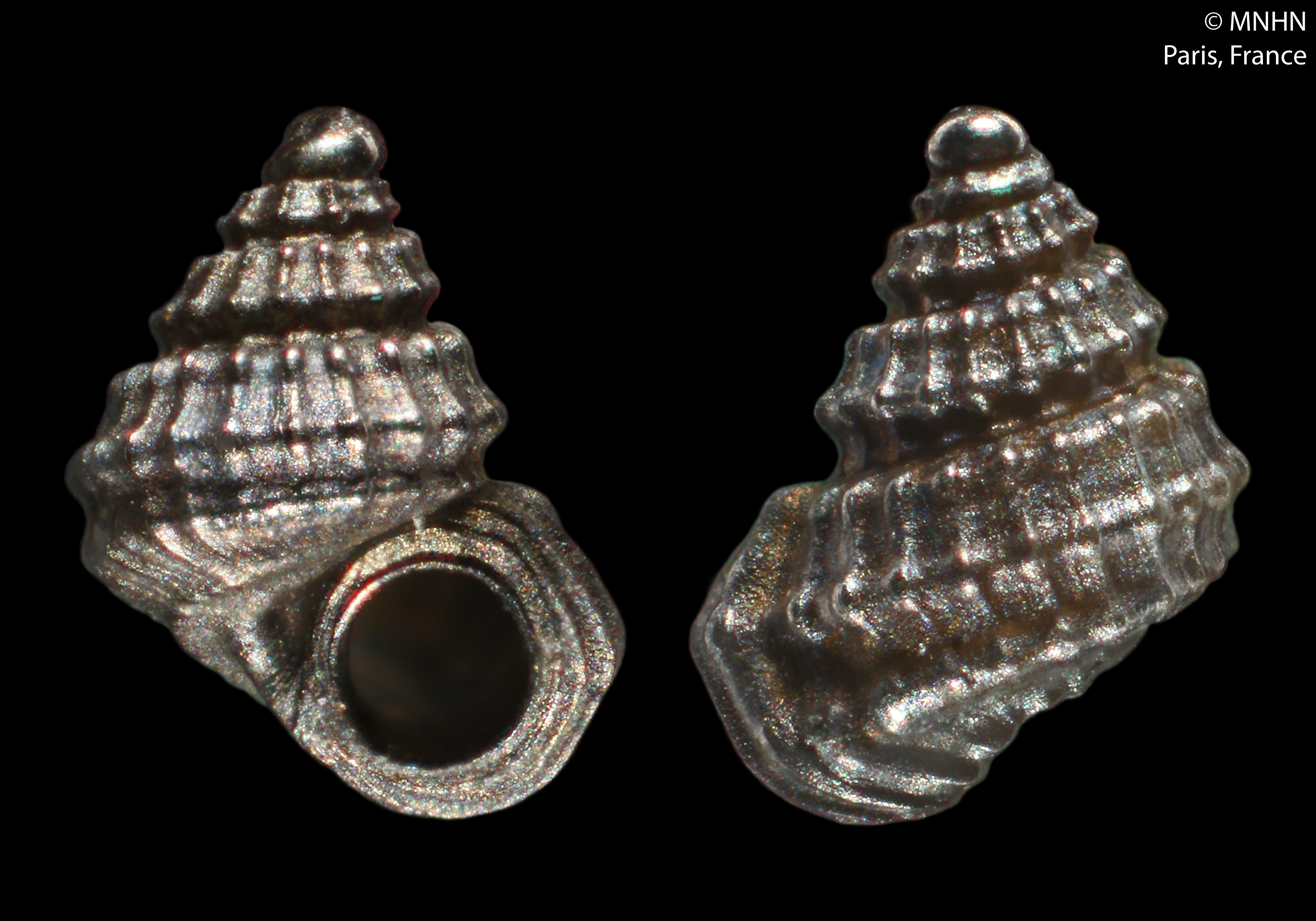
- Shell of Mareleptopoma drivasi (holotype at MNHN, Paris)

Scientific classification
- Kingdom: Animalia
- Phylum: Mollusca
- Class: Gastropoda
- Subclass: Caenogastropoda
- Order: incertae sedis
- Superfamily: Cerithioidea
- Family: Pickworthiidae
- Genus: Mareleptopoma; Moolenbeek & Faber, 1984

Type species
- Mareleptopoma karpatensis Moolenbeek & Faber, 1984

= Mareleptopoma =

Genus of gastropods

Mareleptopoma is a genus of small sea snails, marine gastropod molluscs in the subfamily Pickworthiinae of the family Pickworthiidae.

== Species ==
- Mareleptopoma defluxa Rolán, 2005
- Mareleptopoma drivasi Le Renard & Bouchet, 2003
- Mareleptopoma intermedia Le Renard & Bouchet, 2003
- Mareleptopoma iredalei (Bavay, 1922)
- Mareleptopoma karpatensis Moolenbeek & Faber, 1984
- † Mareleptopoma kenneyi (Ladd, 1966)
- Mareleptopoma minor (Almera & Bofill, 1898)
- Mareleptopoma pellucens Le Renard & Bouchet, 2003
- Mareleptopoma rectangularis Rolán & Fernández-Garcés, 1993
- Mareleptopoma spinosa (Hedley, 1902)
- Mareleptopoma vaubani Le Renard & Bouchet, 2003

Species brought into synonymy

- Mareleptopoma chefyae Rolán, Espinosa & Fernández-Garcés, 1991: synonym of Clatrosansonia chefyae (Rolán, Espinosa & Fernández-Garcés, 1991) (original combination)
- Mareleptopoma circumserrata Raines, 2002: synonym of Clatrosansonia circumserrata (Raines, 2002) (original combination)
- Mareleptopoma cubensis Espinosa, Fernández-Garcés & Rolán, 1990: synonym of Clatrosansonia cubensis (Espinosa, Fernández-Garcés & Rolán, 1990) (original combination)
- Mareleptopoma italica (Raffi & Taviani, 1985): synonym of Mareleptopoma minor (Almera & Bofill, 1898)
- Mareleptopoma katyae Rolán, Espinosa & Fernández-Garcés, 1991: synonym of Chrystella katyae (Rolán, Espinosa & Fernández-Garcés, 1991) (original combination)
- Mareleptopoma scalaris Rolán & Fernández-Garcés, 1993: synonym of Clatrosansonia scalaris (Rolán & Fernández-Garcés, 1993) (original combination)
- Mareleptopoma verdensis Rolán & Rubio, 1999: synonym of Chrystella verdensis (Rolán & Rubio, 1999) (original combination)
