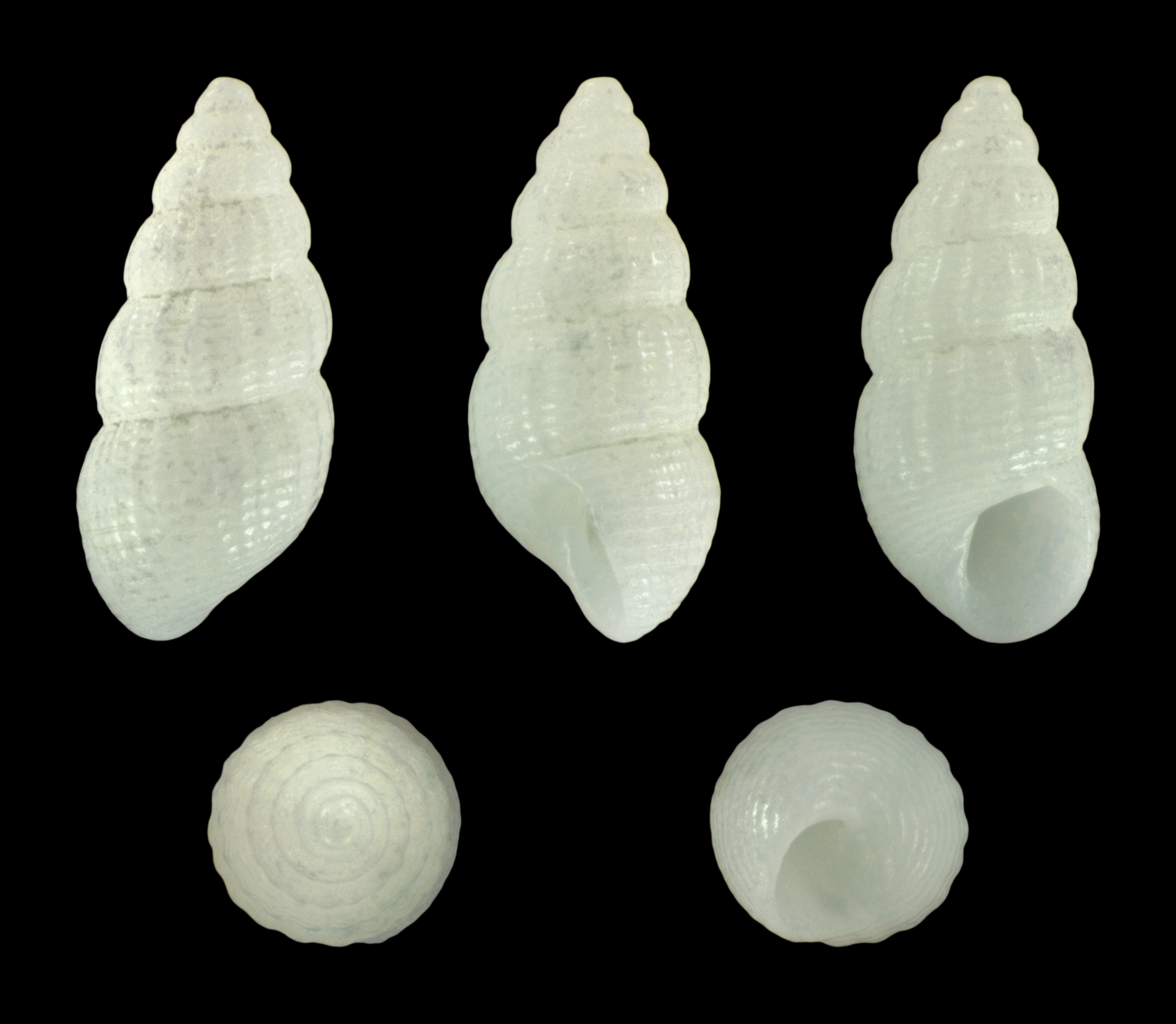

Scientific classification
- Kingdom: Animalia
- Phylum: Mollusca
- Class: Gastropoda
- Subclass: Caenogastropoda
- Order: incertae sedis
- Family: Scaliolidae
- Genus: Finella
- Species: F. pupoides

Binomial name
- Finella pupoides Adams A., 1860

Synonyms
- Alaba striata Watson, 1886; Eufenella ichikawaensis Yokoyama, M., 1927; Eufenella perpupoides Yokoyama, M., 1927; Eufenella pupoides (A. Adams, 1860); Fenella perpupoidesYokoyama, 1927; Fenella pupoides A. Adams, 1864; Fenella pyrrhacusa Melvill, J.C. & R. Standen, 1896; Finella columna (Laseron, 1956); Finella pyrrhacme (Melvill & Standen, 1896); Finella striata (Watson, 1886) (probable synonym); Obtortio columna Laseron, 1956 (probable synonym); Obtortio striata (Watson, 1886); Obtortio pupoides Bosch, Dance, Moolenbeek & Oliver, 1995; Obtortio pyrrhacme Hedley, 1899; Obtortio (Alabina) pyrrhacme Wenz, 1940; Obtortio (Alabina) pupoides Wenz, 1940; † Rissoa ichikawensis Yokoyama, 1927; Rissoa joviana Melvill & Standen, 1896 (possible synonym); Rissoia pyrrhacme Melvill, J.C. & R. Standen, 1896

= Finella pupoides =

Species of gastropod

Finella pupoides is a species of small sea snail, a marine gastropod mollusk in the family Scaliolidae.

== Description ==
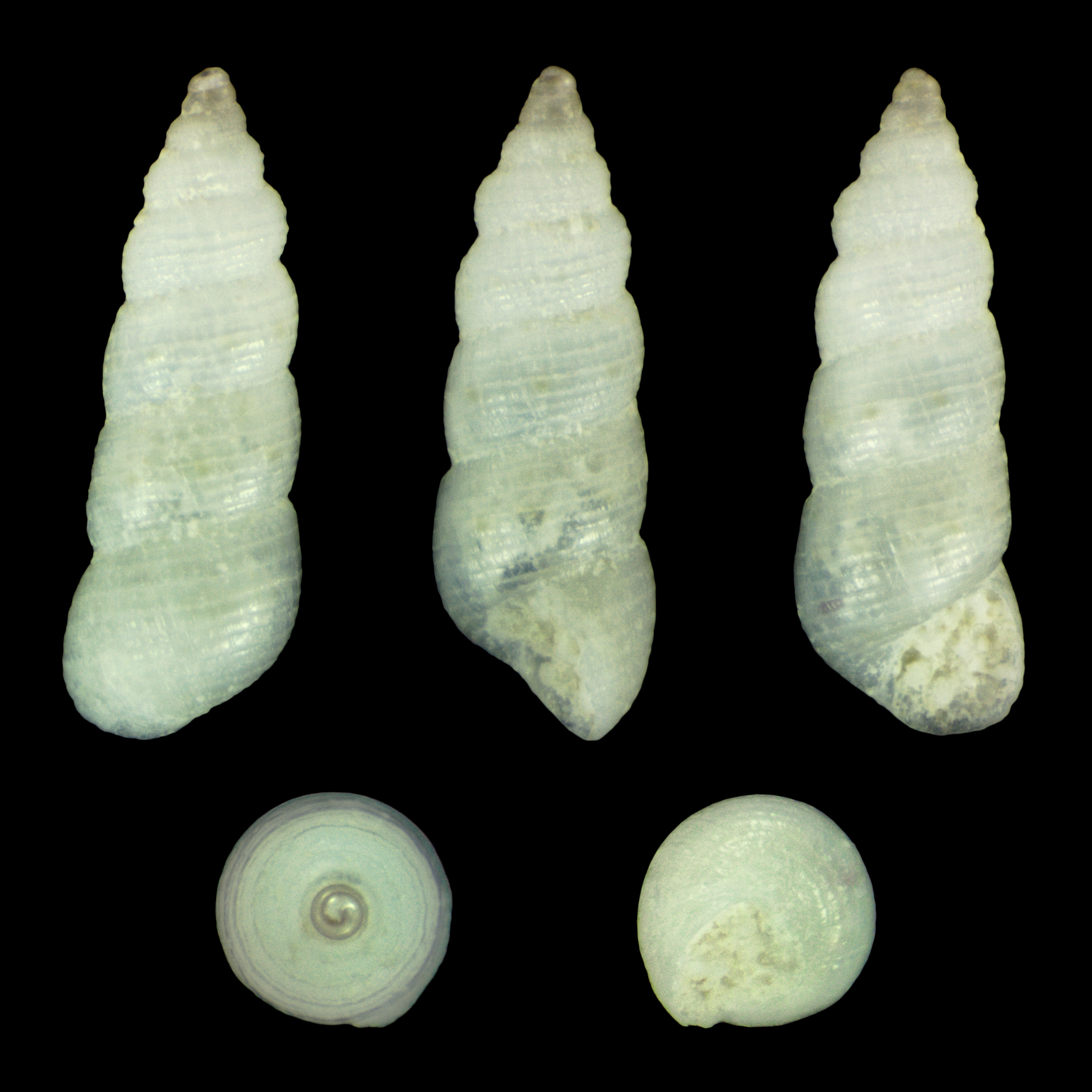
Slender shape

The shell size varies between 2 mm and 4 mm. Its color varies from white to pale yellow, a few times even dark brown. The shell shows typically two indistinct brown bands below the suture and at the base. The shell is elongate, fusiform with a narrow, pointed apex. This protoconch is smooth and contains about 2.5 whorls. The whorls are rather inflated and have deeply marked sutures. The sculpture of the teleoconch has characteristic flat-topped spiral cords with rather weak axial ribs. These form a fine reticulate pattern on the upper whorls. This axial sculpture is reduced to absent on the body whorl. The aperture is semicircular. The narrow columella is curved.

== Distribution ==
This species occurs in the Indian Ocean along Réunion and in the Pacific Ocean in Southeast Asia and Japan; and as non-indigenous marine species through the Suez Canal in European waters and the Mediterranean Sea

== Habitat ==
This species is found in sand or on mud in the sublittoral zone of bays at a depth of 10 m. Live species are rare and this species can be regarded as an endangered species.
