= Brachytrematidae =

Scientific classification
- Kingdom: Animalia
- Phylum: Mollusca
- Class: Gastropoda
- Subclass: Caenogastropoda
- Order: incertae sedis
- Superfamily: Cerithioidea
- Family: †Brachytrematidae; Cossmann, 1906

Extinct family of gastropods

Brachytrematidae is an extinct family of sea snails, marine gastropod molluscs in the clade Sorbeoconcha.

According to the taxonomy of the Gastropoda by Bouchet & Rocroi (2005) the family Brachytrematidae has no subfamilies.
