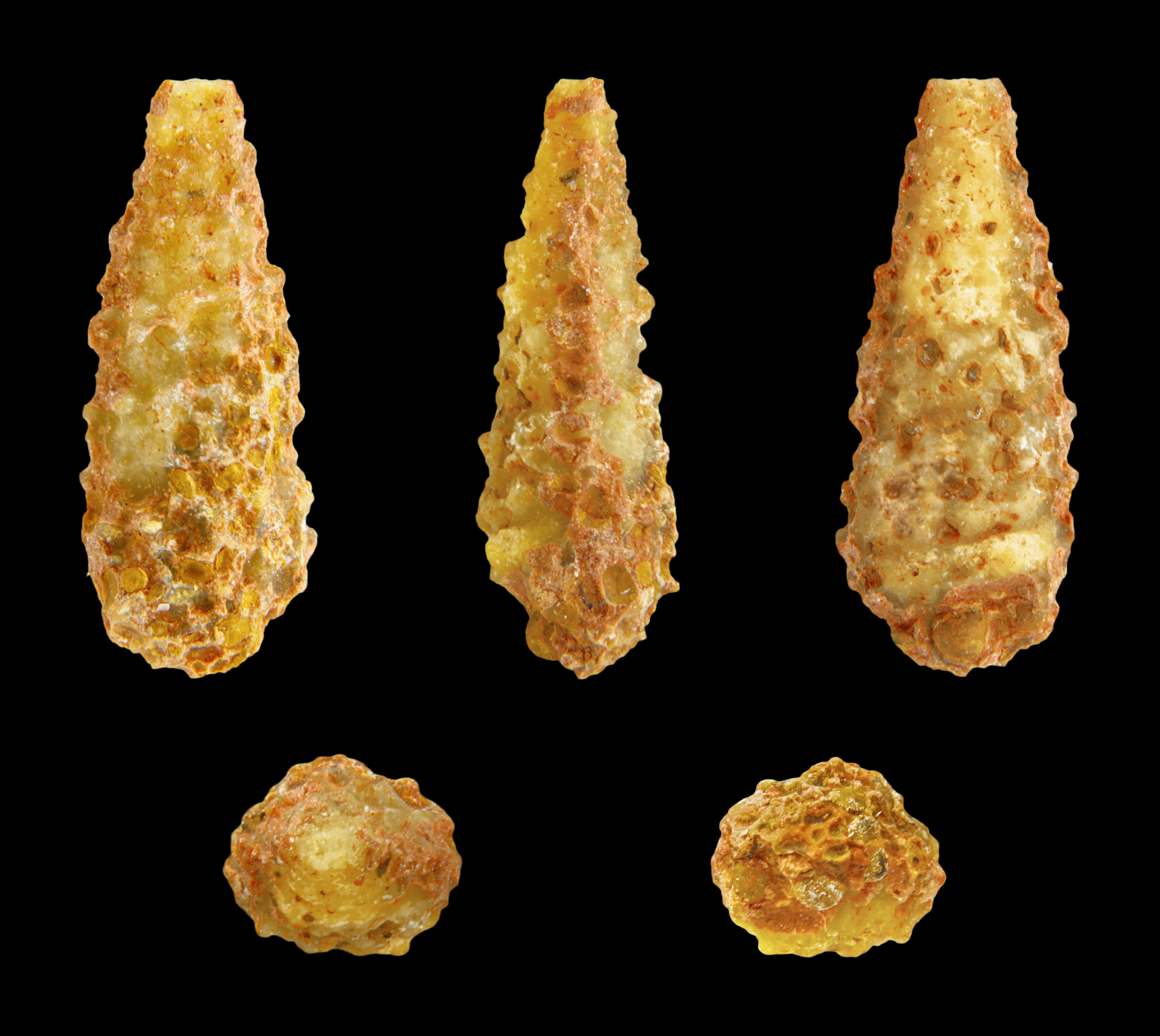
- Rhabdocolpus muricatum (Sowerby, 1825)

Scientific classification
- Kingdom: Animalia
- Phylum: Mollusca
- Class: Gastropoda
- Subclass: Caenogastropoda
- Order: incertae sedis
- Superfamily: Cerithioidea
- Family: †Procerithiidae; Cossmann, 1906

= Procerithiidae =

Procerithiidae Temporal range: Kungurian–Jurassic, 279.3–145.0 Ma

Family of gastropods

Procerithiidae is a taxonomic family of sea snails in the subclass Caenogastropoda. As currently defined, it is extinct, although it has been suggested to include the extant genus Argyropeza.

== Taxonomy ==
No subfamilies are recognized in the MolluscaBase.

=== 2005 taxonomy ===
The following three subfamilies were recognized in the taxonomy of Bouchet & Rocroi (2005):

- †Procerithiinae Cossmann, 1906
- †Paracerithiinae Cossmann, 1906
- Cryptaulacinae Gründel, 1976 – includes Argyropeza

=== 2006 taxonomy ===
Bandel (2006) described a new subfamily, Argyropezinae.

- Argyropezinae Bandel, 2006
- †Procerithiinae Cossmann, 1906 – includes Cryptaulax
- †Paracerithiinae Cossmann, 1906

Bandel (2006) expressed doubts about the validity of Cryptaulacinae, because Cryptaulax and Procerithium may be based on the same species.

== Genera ==
Genera within the family are:

- †Ageria Abbass, 1973
- †Brachycerithium Bonarelli, 1921
- †Campanilopsis P.-H. Fischer, 1956
- †Cerithinella Gemmellaro, 1878
- †Cirsocerithium Cossmann, 1906
- †Infacerithium Gründel, 1974
- †Longaevicerithium Guzhov, 2003
- †Martignyella J.-C. Fischer, 1969
- †Paracerithium Cossmann, 1902 – type genus of the subfamily Paracerithiinae, when considered valid
- †Procerithium Cossmann, 1902
- †Rhabdocolpus Cossmann, 1906
- †Rostrocerithium Cossmann, 1906
- †Sinuozyga Batten, 1985
- †Tyrnoviella Guzhov, 2004
