= Argyropeza verecunda =

Scientific classification
- Kingdom: Animalia
- Phylum: Mollusca
- Class: Gastropoda
- Subclass: Caenogastropoda
- Order: incertae sedis
- Family: Cerithiidae
- Genus: Argyropeza
- Species: A. verecunda

Binomial name
- Argyropeza verecunda (Melvill & Standen, 1903)

Synonyms
- Cerithium verecundum Melvill & Standen, 1903; Cerithium pervicax Melvill, 1904

Species of gastropod

Argyropeza verecunda is a species of sea snail in the family Cerithiidae. It occurs in the Indian and the western Pacific Oceans.

== Description ==
The shell measures 2.4–3.1 mm (0.094–0.122 in) in length and 0.9–1.1 mm (0.035–0.043 in) in width.
