= Globocornidae =

Scientific classification
- Kingdom: Animalia
- Phylum: Mollusca
- Class: Gastropoda
- Subclass: Caenogastropoda
- Subterclass: Sorbeoconcha
- Family: Globocornidae; Espinosa & Ortea, 2010

Family of snails

Globocornidae is a family of gastropods belonging to the subterclass Sorbeoconcha.

Genera:

- Globocornus Espinosa & Ortea, 2010
