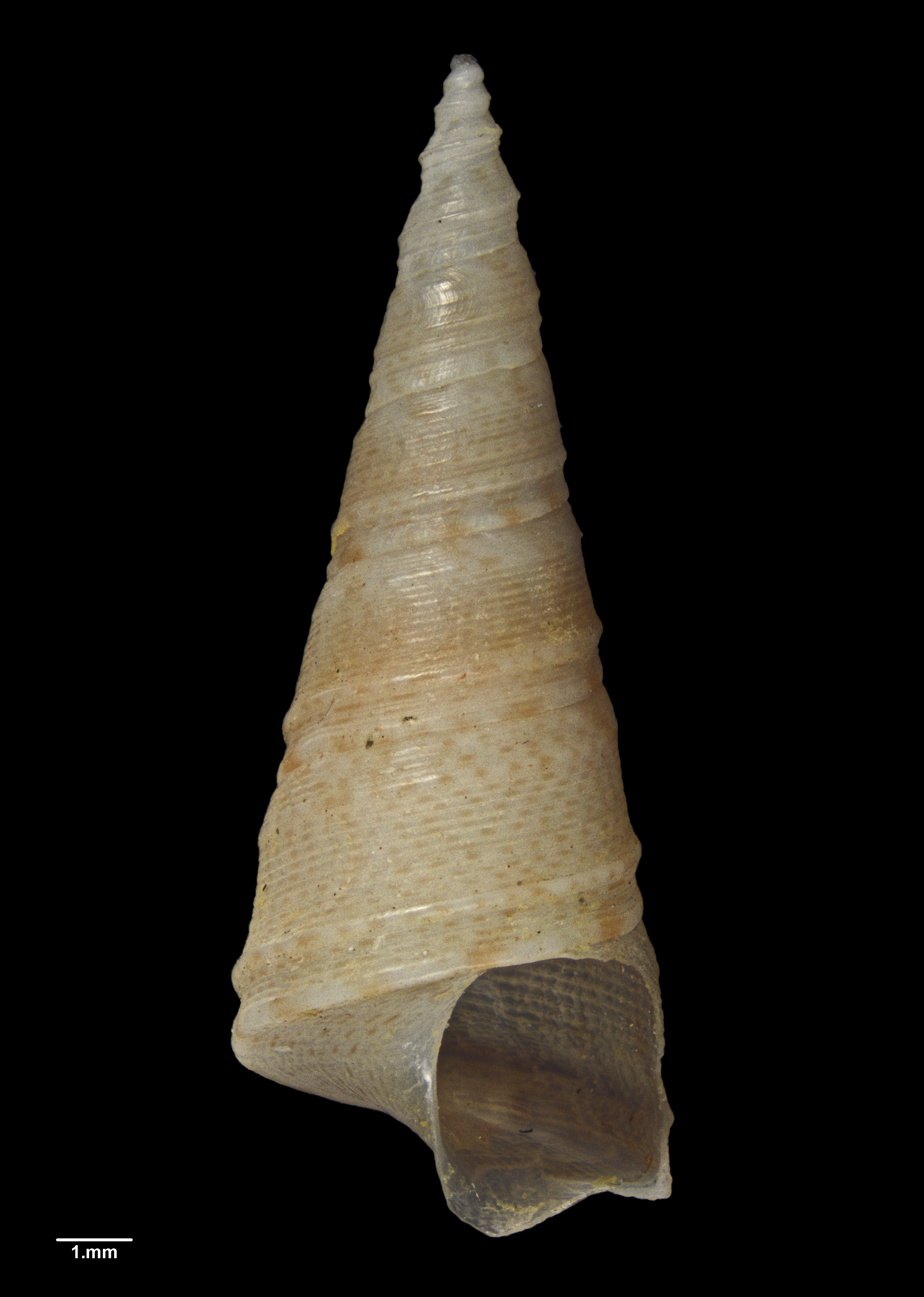

Scientific classification
- Kingdom: Animalia
- Phylum: Mollusca
- Class: Gastropoda
- Subclass: Caenogastropoda
- Order: incertae sedis
- Family: Turritellidae
- Genus: Maoricolpus
- Species: M. finlayi

Binomial name
- Maoricolpus finlayi Powell, 1940

= Maoricolpus finlayi =

Species of gastropod

Maoricolpus finlayi is a species of sea snail, a marine gastropod mollusc in the family Turritellidae. It is known to occur only in Spirits Bay, North Island, New Zealand.

== Description ==
Maoricolpus finlayi have stout shells with concave bases. The shells are pale in colour, and have a smal squarish pattern of dots.

== Distribution ==
The species is Endemic to New Zealand. The holotype was collected from Piwhane / Spirits Bay, at the northern end of the Aupouri Peninsula in the Northland Region of New Zealand.
