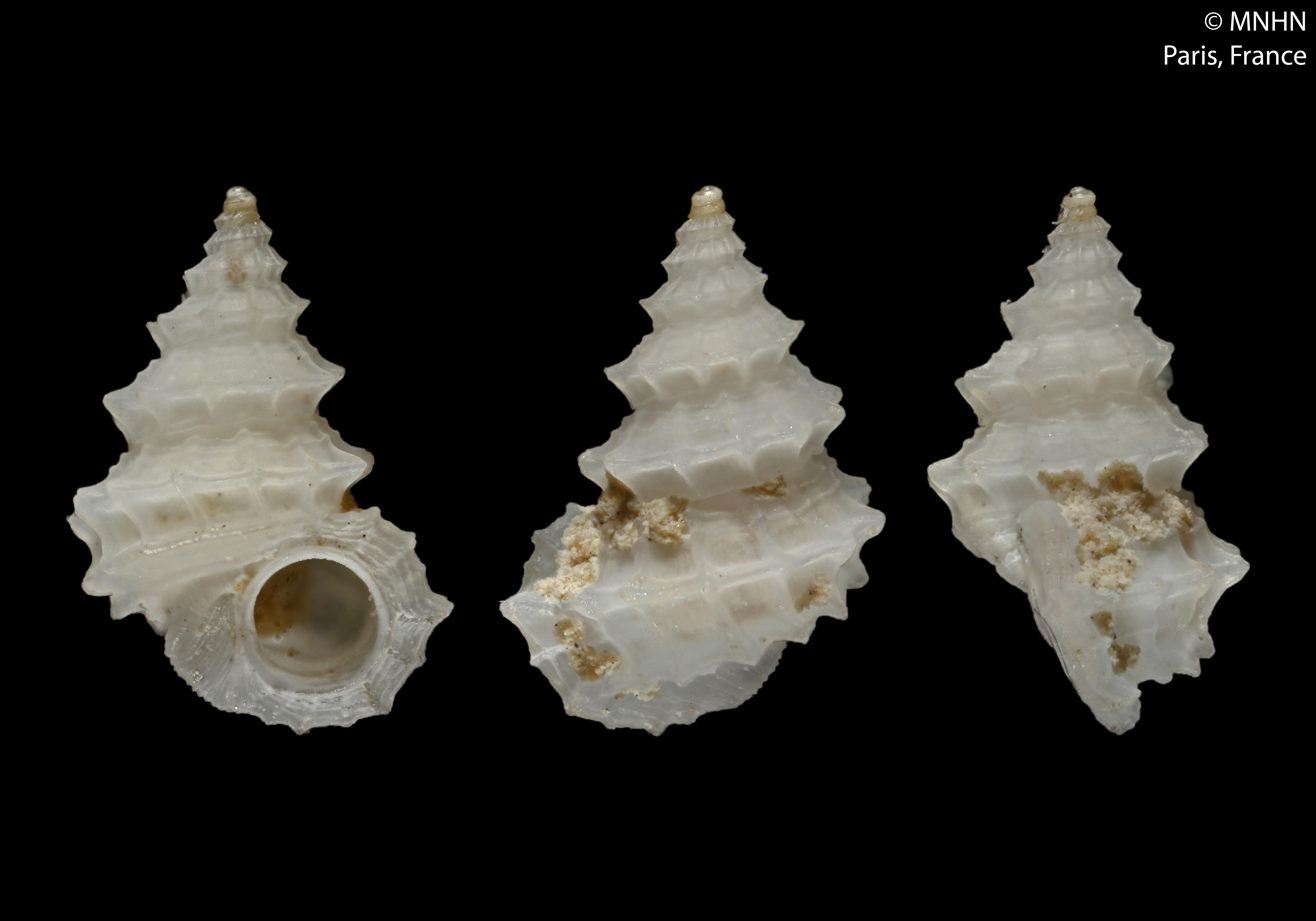
- Shell of Microliotia wargnieri (holotype at MNHN, Paris)

Scientific classification
- Kingdom: Animalia
- Phylum: Mollusca
- Class: Gastropoda
- Subclass: Caenogastropoda
- Order: incertae sedis
- Family: Pickworthiidae
- Genus: Microliotia; Moolenbeek & Faber, 1984

Type species
- † Microliotia brandenburgi O. Boettger, 1902

Synonyms
- Latilabrum Kuroda & Habe, 1991

= Microliotia =

Genus of gastropods

Microliotia is a genus of small sea snails, marine gastropod molluscs in the family Pickworthiidae.

== Description ==
(Original description in Latin) The shell is trochiform (top-shaped) and very thick. The apex is mucronate and stiliform, tapering into a sharp, needle-like point. The base is flattened, while the aperture is very small, highly oblique, and circular in shape. This opening is positioned almost horizontally. Finally, the lip is extremely thick and very widely expanded.

== Species ==
- Microliotia alvanioides Le Renard & Bouchet, 2003
- † Microliotia brandenburgi O. Boettger, 1902
- Microliotia fenestrata Kase, 1998
- Microliotia hawaiiensis Kase, 1998
- † Microliotia imperfecta Lozouet, 2024
- Microliotia koizumii Kase, 1998
- Microliotia mactanensis Kase, 1998
- Microliotia mirabilis (Kuroda & Habe, 1991)
- Microliotia ohashii Kase, 1998
- Microliotia pumilis Kase, 1998
- Microliotia rehderi Kase & Raines, 2017
- Microliotia suturalis Kase, 1998
- Micr†oliotia wargnieri Kase & Letourneux, 2013
