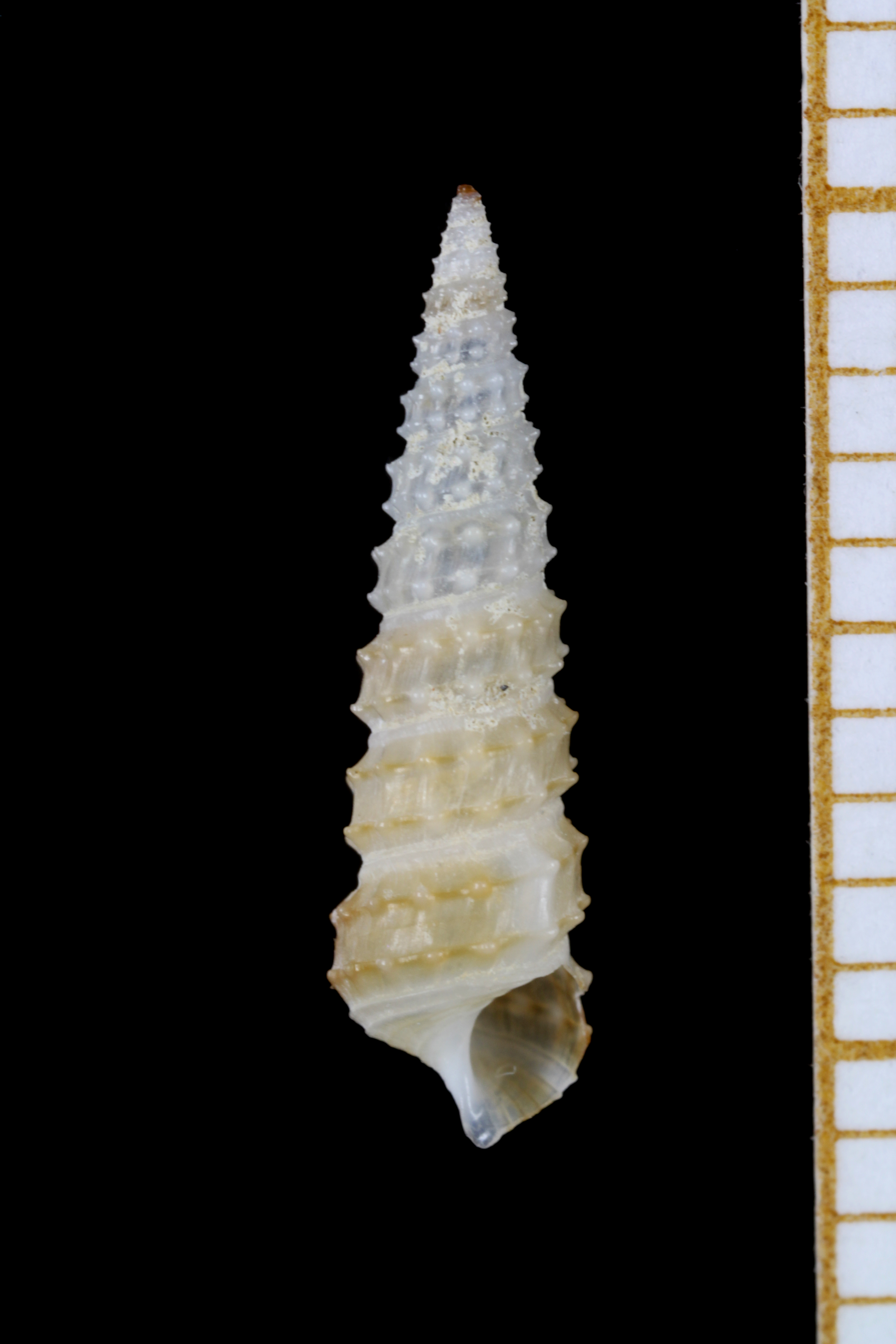
- Argyropeza sp.

Scientific classification
- Kingdom: Animalia
- Phylum: Mollusca
- Class: Gastropoda
- Subclass: Caenogastropoda
- Order: incertae sedis
- Family: Cerithiidae
- Subfamily: Bittiinae
- Genus: Argyropeza; Melvill & Standen, 1901

Type species
- Argyropeza divina Melvill & Standen, 1901

Species
- See text

= Argyropeza =

Argyropeza Temporal range: Early/Lower Miocene–Present, 23.03–0 Ma

Genus of gastropods

Argyropeza is a genus of small deep-sea sea snails in the family Cerithiidae.

The name of this genus is presumed to be derived from the Greek word arguropeza ("silver foot"), the epithet given by Homer to the sea nymph Thetis.

== Taxonomy ==
The genus Argyropeza is closely related to the genus Bittium, but the shells of species in this genus are thinner and more vitreous, and the suture is more deeply impressed. Argyropeza is currently placed in the subfamily Bittiinae with the family Cerithiidae, but various other arrangements have been proposed in the past. It was sometimes assigned to the Litiopidae Gray, 1847 or to the Cerithiinae within Cerithiidae, both belonging to the same superfamily Cerithioidea. The genus has also been placed in Procerithiidae because of its similarity to the fossil genus Crypaulax from the Triassic; this arrangement would let the Argyropeza species considered to be living fossils. According to the Taxonomy of Bouchet & Rocroi (2005) Argyropeza is in the subfamily Cryptaulacinae, within the Procerithiidae. According to Bandel (2006) Argyropeza would be in the then newly described subfamily Argyropezinae Bandel, 2006, within the Procerithiidae.

== Distribution ==
The snails of this deep-sea genus can be found on the continental slopes and island groups in the Indo-Pacific region (Arabian Sea, Australia, Fiji, Indonesia, Japan, Papua, New Guinea, Vanuatu and South Africa). They are detritivores, obtaining their nutrients from detritus and soft sediment.

== Description ==
They are small snails (6 to 8 mm in length) with a thin, vitreous shell that is elongated and has a pointed spire with a smooth tip. The number of the whorls varies between 9 and 12. The shell is sculptured with low axial ribs. Each whorl is marked by two spiral ribs with sharp nodules. The ovate aperture has a marked siphonal canal and a weak anal canal. The aperture is closed off by a thin, corneous, cerithioid operculum that is multispiral and almost circular. The outer lip is thin. The columella is concave. Their protoconch has 3½ whorls and are sculptured with two spiral lirae.

Until the study of Richard S. Houbrick (1980) almost nothing had been written about the soft parts of these snails. The animal has a long siphon. The cephalic tentacles have the eyes at their base. The taenioglossate radula has a quadrate rachdian tooth, flanked on each side a trapezoidal lateral tooth and two long marginal teeth. Their larvae are pelagic.

== Species ==
Species within the genus Aryropeza are:

- Argyropeza divina Melvill & Standen, 1901
- Argyropeza izekiana Kuroda, 1949
- Argyropeza leucocephala (Watson, 1886)
- Argyropeza philippinensis Poppe & Tagaro, 2026 (original description)
- Argyropeza sculpturata Poppe & Tagaro, 2026
- Argyropeza schepmaniana Melvill, 1912
- † Argyropeza spina (M. Hörnes, 1855)
- Argyropeza verecunda Melvill & Standen, 1903
