= Argyropeza divina =

Scientific classification
- Kingdom: Animalia
- Phylum: Mollusca
- Class: Gastropoda
- Subclass: Caenogastropoda
- Order: incertae sedis
- Family: Cerithiidae
- Genus: Argyropeza
- Species: A. divina

Binomial name
- Argyropeza divina Melvill & Standen, 1901

Synonyms
- Cerithium spinigerum Martin, 1884; Potamides (Tympanotonus) spiniger (Martin, 1884)

Species of gastropod

Argyropeza divina is a species of sea snail in the family Cerithiidae. It occurs in the Indian Ocean (including Gulf of Oman, its type locality) and in the western Pacific Ocean.

== Description ==
The shell measures 6.0–7.6 mm (0.24–0.30 in) in length and 1.9–2.7 mm (0.075–0.106 in) in width.
