= Argyropeza leucocephala =

Scientific classification
- Kingdom: Animalia
- Phylum: Mollusca
- Class: Gastropoda
- Subclass: Caenogastropoda
- Order: incertae sedis
- Family: Cerithiidae
- Genus: Argyropeza
- Species: A. leucocephala

Binomial name
- Argyropeza leucocephala (Watson, 1886)

Synonyms
- Bittium leucocephalum Watson, 1886; Cerithium (Bittium) leucocephalum (Watson, 1886)

Species of gastropod

Argyropeza leucocephala is a species of sea snail in the family Cerithiidae. It occurs in the Pacific Ocean in Hawaii and French Polynesia.

== Description ==
The shell measures 3.6–4.4 mm (0.14–0.17 in) in length and 1.1–1.3 mm (0.043–0.051 in) in width.
