= Holandriana =

Scientific classification
- Kingdom: Animalia
- Phylum: Mollusca
- Class: Gastropoda
- Subclass: Caenogastropoda
- Order: incertae sedis
- Superfamily: Cerithioidea
- Family: Amphimelaniidae
- Genus: Holandriana; Bourguignat, 1884

Genus of gastropods

Holandriana is a genus of gastropods belonging to the monotypic family Amphimelaniidae.

The species of this genus are found in Europe, Northern America, Northern Africa.

Species:

- Holandriana fossariformis (Tournouër, 1879)
- Holandriana frici (Brusina, 1897)
- Holandriana fuchsi (Wenz, 1928)
- Holandriana gaji (Brusina, 1878)
- Holandriana heckneri (Koch, 1917)
- Holandriana hellespontica (Calvert & Neumayr, 1880)
- Holandriana holandrii (C.Pfeiffer, 1828)
- Holandriana krambergeri (Brusina, 1902)
- Holandriana macedonica (Burgerstein, 1877)
- Holandriana patula (Bellardi & Michelotti, 1841)
- Holandriana pecchiolii (M.Hörnes, 1856)
- Holandriana ricinus (Neumayr, 1875)
- Holandriana serbica (Živković, 1893)
