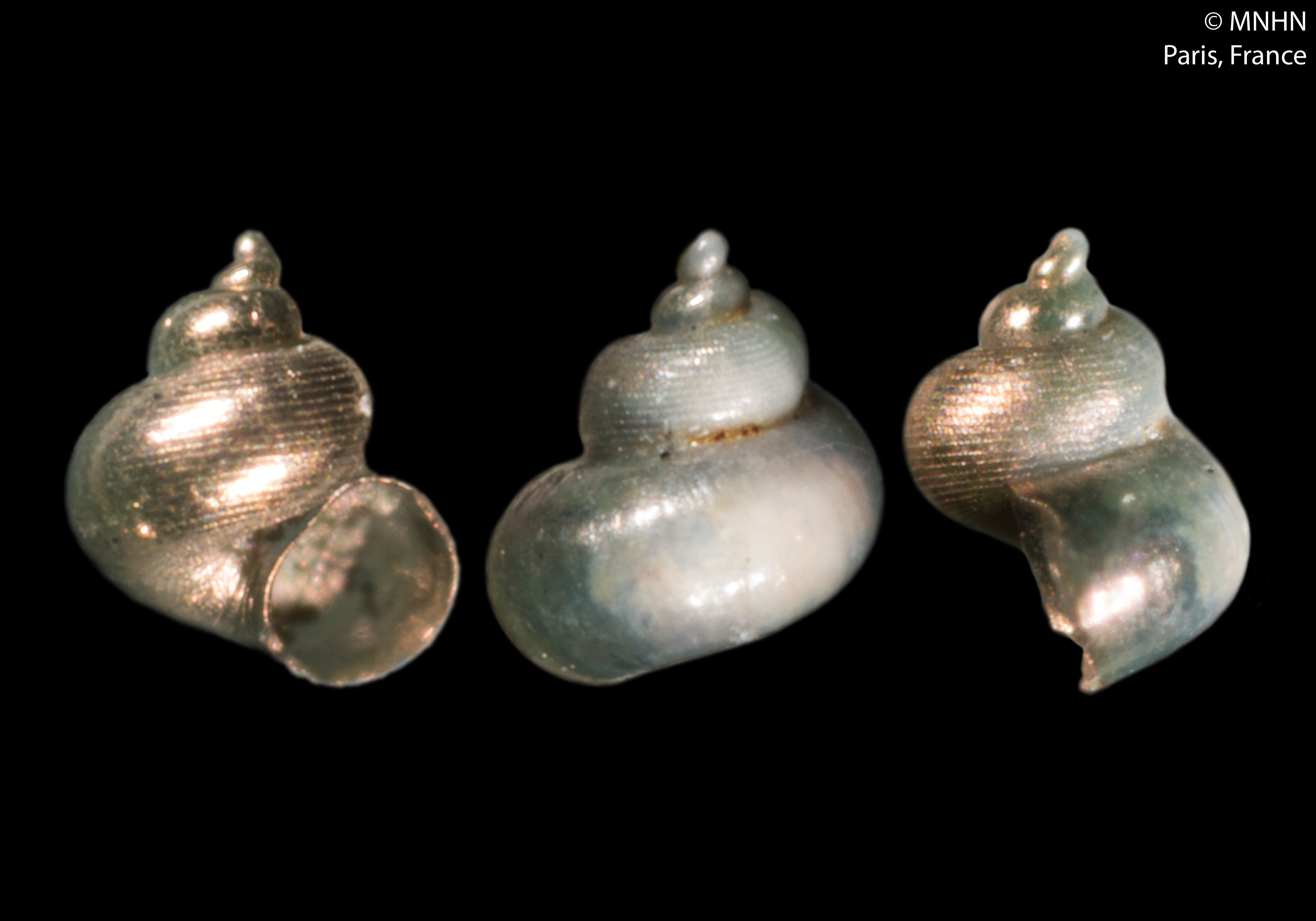
- Shell of † Microstilifer marsanensis (holotype at MNHN, Paris)

Scientific classification
- Kingdom: Animalia
- Phylum: Mollusca
- Class: Gastropoda
- Subclass: Caenogastropoda
- Order: incertae sedis
- Superfamily: Cerithioidea
- Genus: Microstilifer; Warén, 1980

Type species
- Stilifer auricula Hedley, 1907

= Microstilifer =

Genus of gastropods

Microstilifer is a genus of small salt marsh or mudflat snails, marine gastropod mollusks in an unassigned family in the superfamily Cerithioidea.

== Species ==
Species within the genus Microstilifer include:

- Microstilifer auricula (Hedley, 1907)
- † Microstilifer marsanensis Lozouet, 1998
