= Argyropeza izekiana =

Scientific classification
- Kingdom: Animalia
- Phylum: Mollusca
- Class: Gastropoda
- Subclass: Caenogastropoda
- Order: incertae sedis
- Family: Cerithiidae
- Genus: Argyropeza
- Species: A. izekiana

Binomial name
- Argyropeza izekiana Kuroda, 1949

Species of gastropod

Argyropeza izekiana is a species of sea snail in the family Cerithiidae. It occurs in the Indian and the western Pacific Oceans. It is named for Mr. Izeki.

== Description ==
The shell measures 4.2–5.3 mm (0.17–0.21 in) in length and 1.4–1.8 mm (0.055–0.071 in) in width.
