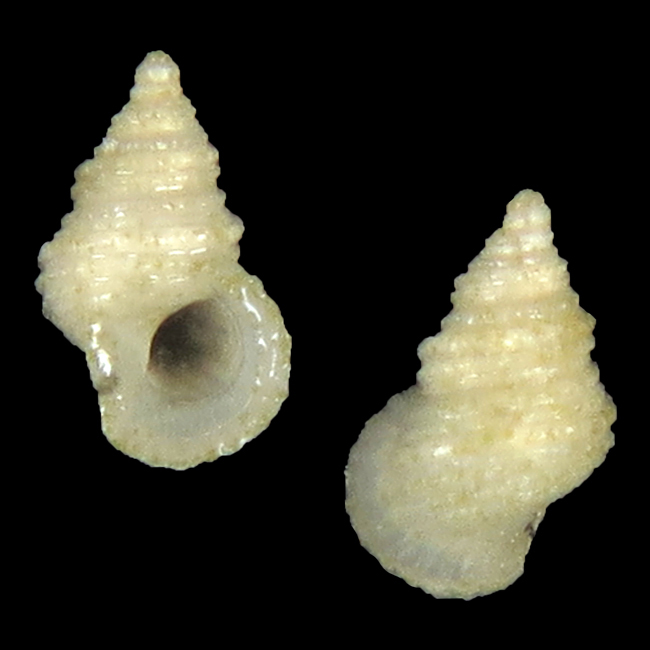
- Shell of Ampullosansonia renephilippei

Scientific classification
- Kingdom: Animalia
- Phylum: Mollusca
- Class: Gastropoda
- Subclass: Caenogastropoda
- Order: incertae sedis
- Family: Pickworthiidae
- Subfamily: Pickworthiinae
- Genus: Ampullosansonia; Kase, 1999

Type species
- Ampullosansonia hyalina Kase, 1999

= Ampullosansonia =

Genus of gastropods

Ampullosansonia is a genus of sea snail, a marine gastropod mollusk in the family Pickworthiidae.

== Species ==
- Ampullosansonia atlantica Espinosa, Ortea & Fernández-Garcés, 2008
- Ampullosansonia crassicostata Kase, 1999
- Ampullosansonia fragilis Kase, 1999
- Ampullosansonia hyalina Kase, 1999
- Ampullosansonia renephilippei Poppe, Tagaro & Goto, 2018
