= Obtortionidae =

Scientific classification
- Kingdom: Animalia
- Phylum: Mollusca
- Class: Gastropoda
- Subclass: Caenogastropoda
- Order: incertae sedis
- Superfamily: Cerithioidea
- Family: Obtortionidae; Thiele, 1925

Family of gastropods

Obtortionidae is a family of sea snails, marine gastropod molluscs in the superfamily Cerithioidea, that is within the clade Cerithimorpha or in clade Sorbeoconcha.

The shell of the larva is ornamental.

== 2005 taxonomy ==
According to the taxonomy of the Gastropoda by Bouchet & Rocroi (2005) the family Obtortionidae has been recognized as a synonym of family Scaliolidae within clade Caenogastropoda/clade Sorbeoconcha/Superfamily Cerithioidea. Finellidae has been also a synonym of Scaliolidae.

== 2006 taxonomy ==
Bandel (2006) have classified Obtortionidae in superfamily Cerithioidea within clade Cerithimorpha in the order Palaeo-Caenogastropoda Bandel, 1993 within subclass Caenogastropoda.

== Genera ==
Genera within the family Obtortionidae include:

- Obtortio Hedley, 1899
- Clathrofenella Kuroda & Habe, 1952
- Finella Adams, 1860 is in subfamily Finellinae within Bittiidae per Bandel (2006) but it used to be classified in Obtortionidae also (WoRMS 2009).
