= Argyropeza schepmaniana =

Scientific classification
- Kingdom: Animalia
- Phylum: Mollusca
- Class: Gastropoda
- Subclass: Caenogastropoda
- Order: incertae sedis
- Family: Cerithiidae
- Genus: Argyropeza
- Species: A. schepmaniana

Binomial name
- Argyropeza schepmaniana Melvill, 1912

Species of mollusc

Argyropeza schepmaniana is a species of sea snail in the family Cerithiidae. It occurs in the Indian and the western Pacific Oceans.

The specific name schepmaniana is in honor of Dutch malacologist Mattheus Marinus Schepman.

== Description ==
The shell measures 3.8–4.6 mm (0.15–0.18 in) in length and 1.2–1.4 mm (0.047–0.055 in) in width.
