= Prisciphoridae =

Scientific classification
- Kingdom: Animalia
- Phylum: Mollusca
- Class: Gastropoda
- (unranked): clade Caenogastropoda clade Sorbeoconcha
- Family: †Prisciphoridae Bandel, Gründel, Maxwell, 2000

Synonyms
- Prisciophoridae

Extinct family of gastropods

† Prisciphoridae is an extinct family of sea snails, marine gastropod mollusks in the clade Sorbeoconcha.

The original spelling was Prisciophoridae, but it was changed Prisciphoridae.

According to the taxonomy of the Gastropoda by Bouchet & Rocroi (2005) the family Prisciphoridae has no subfamilies. It is unassigned to superfamily.

== Genera ==
- † Prisciphora Schröder, 1992 - type genus, synonym: Prisciophora
  - † Prisciophora schroederi Bandel, Gründel, Maxwell, 2000
