= Scaliola =

Scientific classification
- Kingdom: Animalia
- Phylum: Mollusca
- Class: Gastropoda
- Subclass: Caenogastropoda
- Order: incertae sedis
- Family: Scaliolidae
- Genus: Scaliola; A. Adams, 1860

Type species
- Scaliola bella A. Adams, 1860

Genus of gastropods

Scaliola is a genus of sea snails, marine gastropod mollusks in the family Scaliolidae.

== Species ==
Species within the genus Scaliola include:

- Scaliola arenosa A. Adams
- Scaliola bella A. Adams, 1860
- Scaliola caledonica Crosse, 1870
- Scaliola elata Issel, 1869
- Scaliola glareosa A. Adams, 1862
- Scaliola gracilis A. Adams, 1862
- Scaliola lapillifera Hedley, 1899
