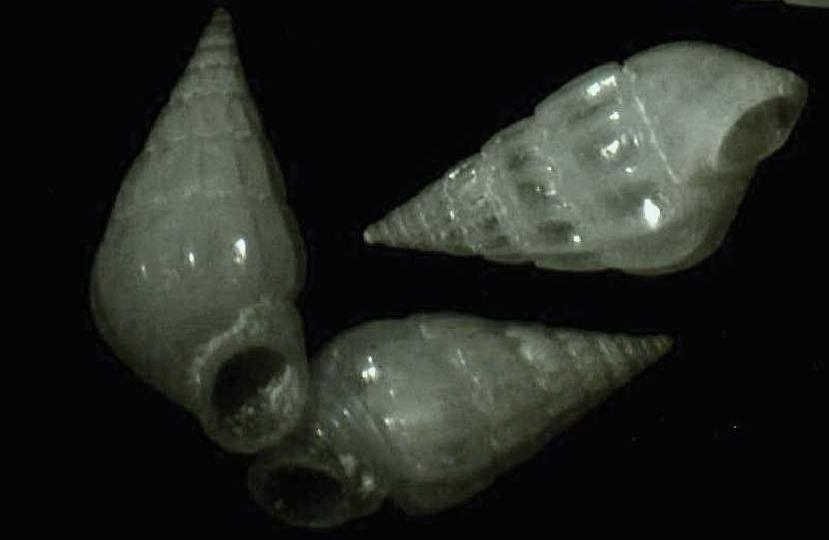
- Three shells of Reynellona natalis

Scientific classification
- Kingdom: Animalia
- Phylum: Mollusca
- Class: Gastropoda
- Subclass: Caenogastropoda
- Order: incertae sedis
- Superfamily: Cerithioidea
- Family: Pickworthiidae; Iredale, 1917

Type species
- Mareleptopoma karpatensis Moolenbeek & Faber, 1984

= Pickworthiidae =

Family of gastropods

Pickworthiidae is a family of small sea snails, marine gastropod molluscs in the superfamily Cerithioidea.

== Subfamilies ==
The following three subfamilies are recognized in the taxonomy of Bouchet & Rocroi (2005):

- Subfamily Pickworthiinae Iredale, 1917 - synonym: Reynellonidae Iredale, 1917
- Subfamily Sherborniinae Iredale, 1917 - synonym: Faxiidae Ravn, 1933
- Subfamily Pelycidiinae Ponder & Hall, 1983: raised to the rank of family Pelycidiidae by Ponder W.F. & Hall S.J. (1983)

== Genera ==
Genera in the family Pickworthiidae include:

Subfamily Pickworthiinae Iredale, 1917 (synonym: Reynellonidae)

- Ampullosansonia Kase, 1999
- Astrosansonia Le Renard & Bouchet, 2003
- Chrystella Laseron, 1957
- Clatrosansonia Sabelli & Taviani, 2003
- Cubasansonia Espinosa, Ortea & Fernandez-Garces, 2005
- Discrevinia Laseron, 1957
- Kaseilla Moolenbeek & Hoenselaar, 2010
- Mareleptopoma Moolenbeek & Faber, 1984
- Microliotia Boettger, 1902
- Reynellona Iredale, 1917
- Sansonia Jousseaume, 1892
- Sansoniella Moolenbeek, 2008
- Tinianella Kase, 1999

Subfamily Sherborniinae Iredale, 1917 (synonym: Faxiidae)

- Sherbornia Iredale, 1917

Genera brought into synonymy

- Latilabrum Kuroda & Habe, 1991: synonym of Microliotia Boettger, 1902
- Mecoliotia Hedley, 1899: synonym of Sansonia Jousseaume, 1892
- Pickworthia Iredale, 1917: synonym of Sansonia Jousseaume, 1892

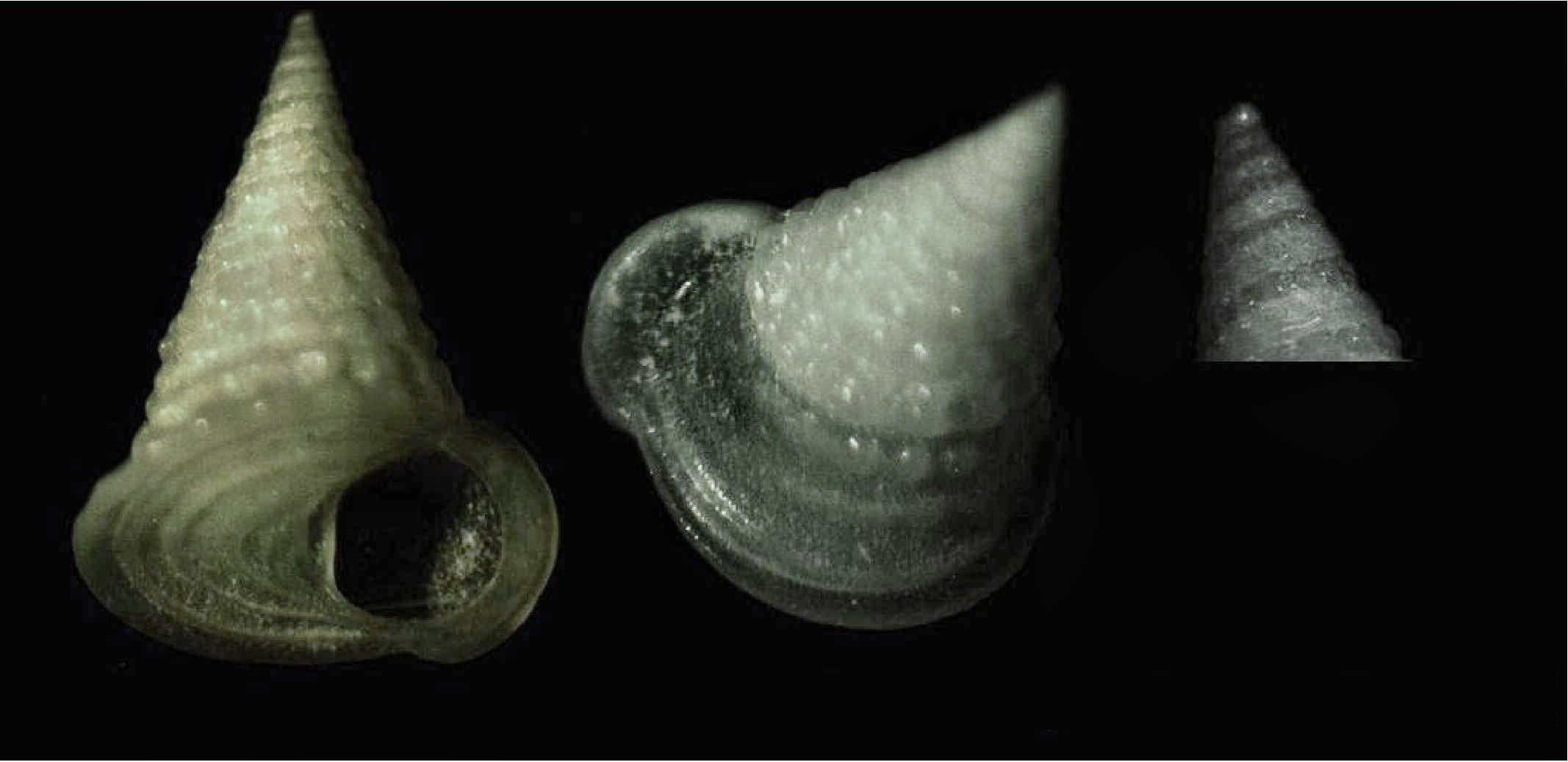
shell of Sansonia kirkpatricki
