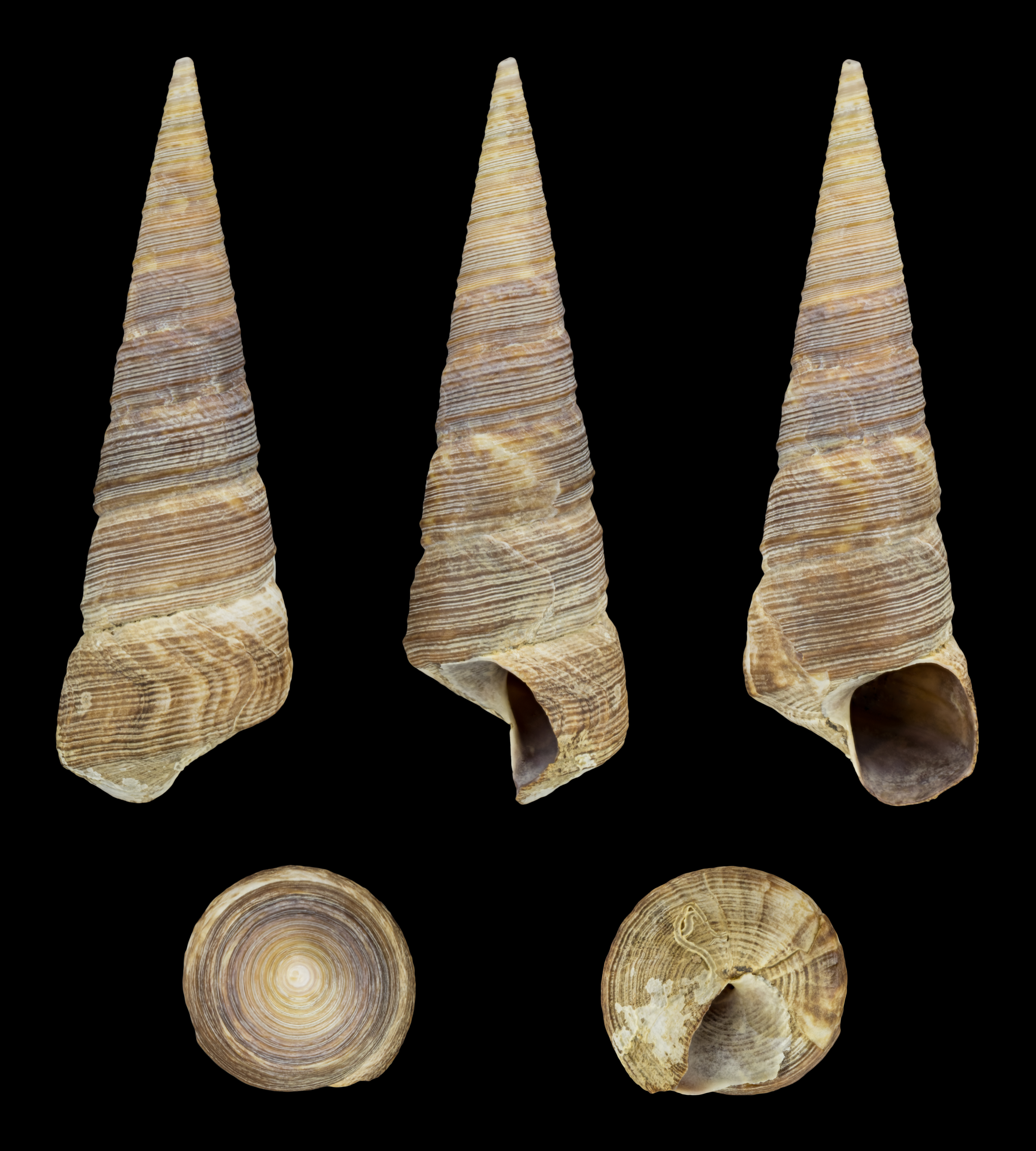

Scientific classification
- Kingdom: Animalia
- Phylum: Mollusca
- Class: Gastropoda
- Subclass: Caenogastropoda
- Order: incertae sedis
- Family: Turritellidae
- Genus: Maoricolpus
- Species: M. roseus

Binomial name
- Maoricolpus roseus (Quoy and Gaimard, 1834)

Synonyms
- † Maoricolpus proroseus Marwick, 1931; Maoricolpus roseus manukauensis Powell, 1931; Maoricolpus roseus roseus (Quoy & Gaimard, 1834) (Alternate representation); Turritella (Haustator) rosea Quoy & Gaimard, 1834 (Alternate representation - Synonym); Turritella difficilis Suter, 1908; Turritella lineolata Kiener, 1843; Turritella rosea Quoy & Gaimard, 1834 (Original combination)

= Maoricolpus roseus =

Species of gastropod

Maoricolpus roseus is a species of gastropod mollusc belonging to the family Turritellidae. The species is found in eastern Australia and New Zealand.

== Description ==
Maoricolpus roseus has a spiral cone shape shell that grows up to 87 mm in length and 25 mm in width. Maoricolpus roseus is brownish/purple in colour with a tint of marble. The protoconch of the shell has three to four tiny round sections and does not have a visible nucleus. The teleoconch of the shell has about 18 whorls which forms a shape with two angles and a slightly indented middle. The texture of the shell involves three thick ridges with the middle appearing first followed by the lower one, then the upper. The shell is covered with very fine and coarse lines. The base of the shell is flat with many strong lines and growth marks.

== Taxonomy ==
The species was first described by Jean René Constant Quoy and Joseph Paul Gaimard in 1834 as Turritella rosea, based on material collected during the first voyage of the Astrolabe to New Zealand. In 1926, Harold Finlay described the genus Maoricolpus, naming M. roseus as the type species of the new genus, which remains the currently accepted name today. While a subspecies, Maoricolpus rosea manukauensis, was described in 1931, this was synonymised in 2014, after genetic analysis indicated that the subspecies did not represent a distinct clade.

== Geographical distribution and habitat ==
=== Natural global range ===
Maoricolpus roseus is native to New Zealand but inhabits large parts of Australian waters. It can be found off the coast of New South Wales, the Eastern coast of Victoria, Tasmania and around New Zealand. It is tolerant in different temperatures and depths allowing the distribution to extend down the coast of Australia. Many samples have been found at beaches in Australia such as Botany Bay in 1999 and in the D’Entrecasteuax Channel in 1935.

=== New Zealand range ===
Maoricolpus roseus is found around most of New Zealand's coastlines. Some locations that M. roseus has been found in New Zealand is Otago Harbour and in Tauranga.

=== Habitat preferences ===
Maoricolpus roseus is often found at the benthos of the ocean. Maoricolpus roseus are found frequently in the crevices of rocks walls and sheltered pockets on more exposed reefs. Maoricolpus roseus can also be found on soft sediment such as silt and gravel. Maoricolpus roseus is able to tolerate at a range of temperatures. Maoricolpus roseus can tolerate minimum temperatures of 8.4 °C and maximum of 20 °C for adults. They are able to survive depths up to 200 m but also low intertidal zones.

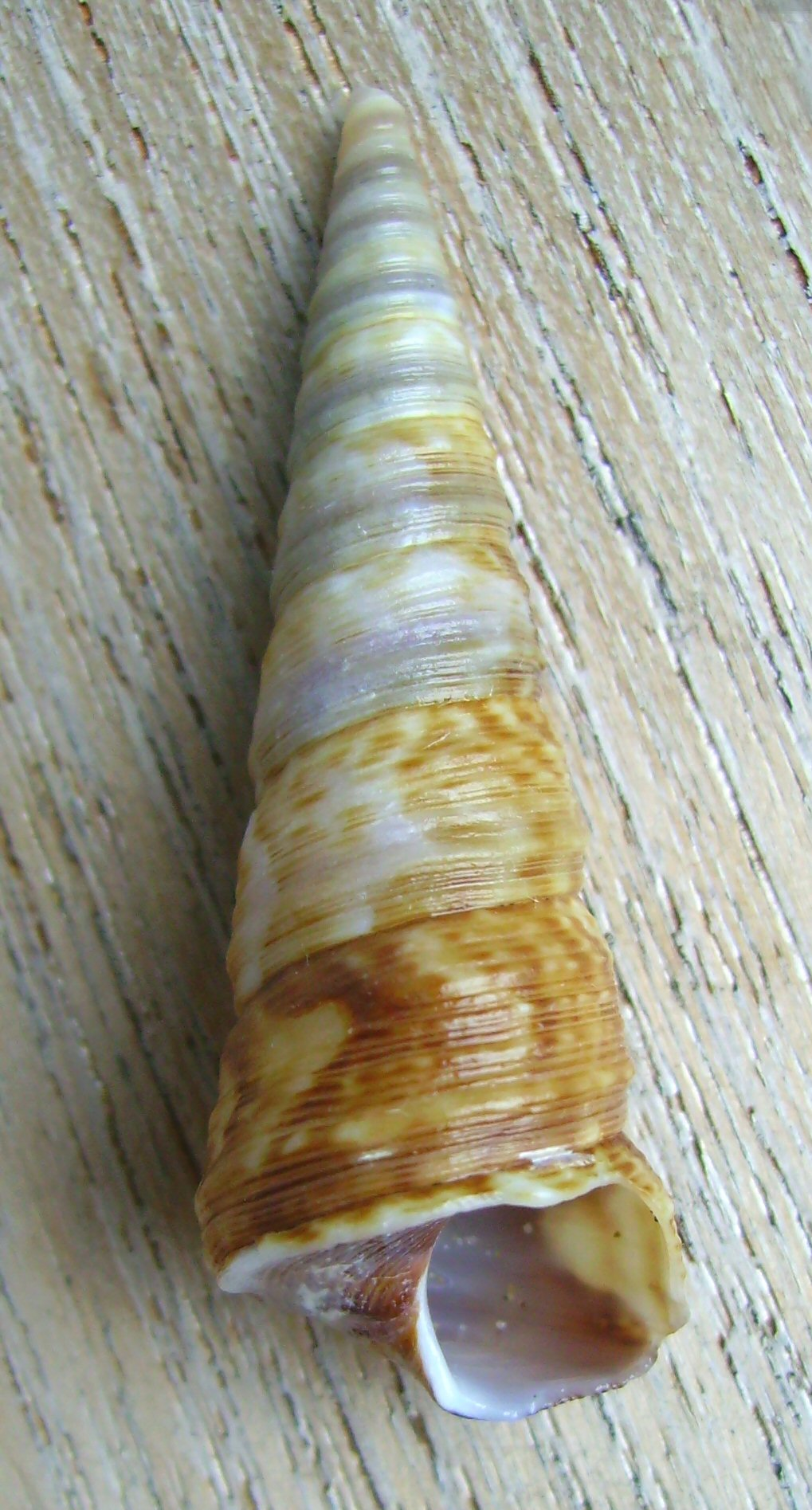
Maoricolpus roseus found in Auckland, New Zealand

== Life cycle / phenology ==
Maoricolpus roseus can either have direct or indirect embryonic development. Direct embryonic development is where the veliger stage occurs within the egg capsule. Indirect embryonic development involves a veliger larvae spending a longer time in the water which is suggested by the multispiral protoconch. The egg capsule is held onto by the adults right before or just after the eggs hatch. A study done on M. rosues in Otago 1969, showed that each shell stored between 100 and 150 egg capsules, each containing 120 embryos. However, only 7–8 embryos per capsule developed into veligers and the rest were abortive. It takes over a year for M. roseus to mature with the fastest growth occurring in the first two years. Some planktonic veligers of M. roseus can began shell coiling and doubling in size after two weeks. Growth rates are positively related to the levels of planktonic microalgae. The average life span occurs around the 2–3 year mark with some isotope analysts suggest the max ages of 6–7 years. Male M. roseus gonads contain active sperm from December to March, while female gonads are enlarged from November to January. In New Zealand, egg capsules have been found absent in March meaning that larvae hatch around the late summer to autumn period.

== Diet ==
Maoricolpus roseus are suspension feeders that forage for food by filtering small particles from the water column. It is common that for other Turritellidae, when phytoplankton abundance levels are low, they are able to switch to a ‘deposit feeding’ system; however, it is unknown whether M. roseus can switch modes. Analysis from isotopes done off species off the coast off southeast Australia, compared with organic matter and sediment reveals that the food source for M. roseus originates from lower trophic levels.

== Predators ==
Maoricolpus roseus does not have many known predators; however, a study done between 1993 and 1996, sampled 5684 specimens of 100 different species of fish guts for analysis. From the 100 species, 17 species recorded remains of M. roseus with 6 species having frequencies of 20%. Many of the species that had recorded remains of M. roseus all had mouthparts that were strong enough to crush their prey. Most predation is found to be done on juveniles.

== Other information ==
Maoricolpus roseus is believed to have dispersed from New Zealand to Tasmania and other parts of Australia in the 1920s via oyster shipments and water ballast from vessels from New Zealand. Tiostrea chilensis and/or Crassostrea glomerata were shipped and imported to Tasmania to improve the local oyster industry. During the 1920s until 1930, they were held alive in crates in water to be sold at the Hobart fish market. Water currents that carried planktonic larvae in the Tasman Sea travelling from west to east also is an explanation for the rapid spread of M. roseus in Australian waters.

In a 2008 study conducted at the D’Entrecasteux Channel in Tasmania, researchers investigated larvae and sex ratios of M. roseus . Their findings revealed that at the location, the sex ratio of 1:1 remained relatively stable. Moreover, the male and female gonads were both distinctive in color and morphology indicating that M. roseus has two sexes.
