= Canterburyellidae =

Scientific classification
- Kingdom: Animalia
- Phylum: Mollusca
- Class: Gastropoda
- (unranked): clade Caenogastropoda clade Sorbeoconcha
- Family: †Canterburyellidae Bandel, Gründel, Maxwell, 2000

Genera
- See text

Extinct family of gastropods

† Canterburyellidae is an extinct family of sea snails, marine gastropod mollusks in the clade Sorbeoconcha.

According to the taxonomy of the Gastropoda by Bouchet & Rocroi (2005) the family Canterburyellidae has no subfamilies. It is unassigned to superfamily.
