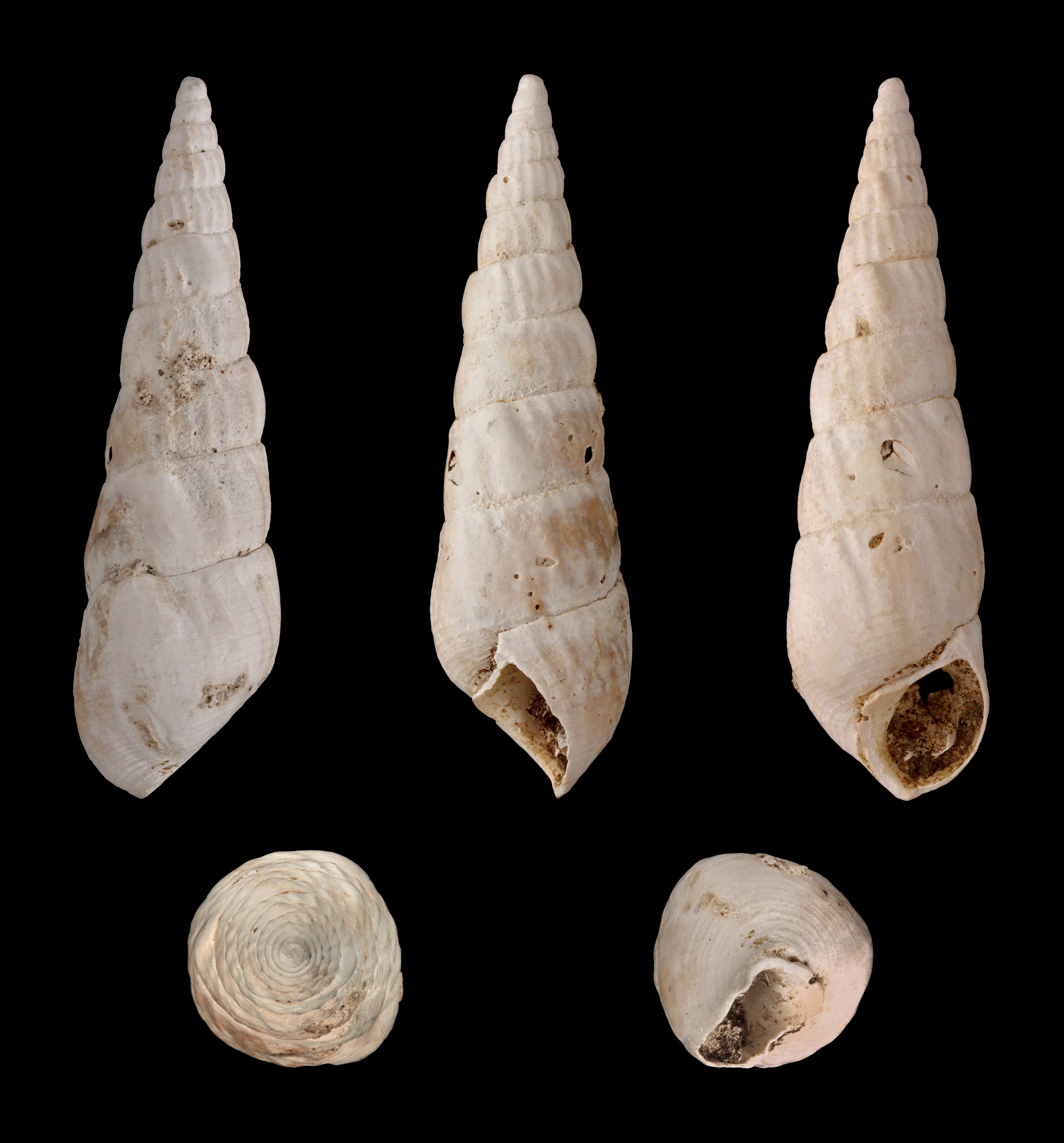
- Diastoma costellatum (Lamarck, 1804), the type species from the Eocene of France

Scientific classification
- Kingdom: Animalia
- Phylum: Mollusca
- Class: Gastropoda
- Subclass: Caenogastropoda
- Order: incertae sedis
- Superfamily: Cerithioidea
- Family: Diastomatidae; A. E. M. Cossmann, 1894

Diversity
- 1 extant species

Synonyms
- Diastomidae Cossmann, 1893; Ewekoroiidae Adegoke, 1977

= Diastomatidae =

Family of gastropods

Diastomatidae is a family of sea snails, marine gastropod molluscs in the superfamily Cerithioidea.

According to the taxonomy of the Gastropoda by Bouchet & Rocroi (2005) the family Diastomatidae has no subfamilies.

== Genera ==
Genera in the family Diastomatidae include:

- Aneurychilus Cossmann, 1889
- Diastoma Deshayes, 1850 - type genus of the family Diastomatidae, the type species of this genus is extinct
  - † Diastoma acuminiense Cossmann, 1882 or Diastoma acumininense Cossmann, 1882
  - † Diastoma costellatum (Lamarck, 1804) - type species, from Eocene of the Paris Basin
  - † Diastoma elaenia Olsson, 1929
  - † Diastoma elongatum Brongniart, 1823
  - † Diastoma insulaemaris Pilsbry & Harbison, 1933
  - Diastoma melanioides (Reeve, 1849) - it is the only extant species of this family
  - † Diastoma multispiratum Cossmann, 1881
  - † Diastoma roncanum (Brongniart)
  - † Diastoma sameri Abbass, 1967
- † Ewekoroia Adegoke, 1977 - the type species of this genus is extinct
- † Keilostoma Deshayes, 1850
