= Pelycidiidae =

Scientific classification
- Kingdom: Animalia
- Phylum: Mollusca
- Class: Gastropoda
- Subclass: Caenogastropoda
- Order: incertae sedis
- Superfamily: Cerithioidea
- Family: Pelycidiidae; Cossmann, 1906

Family of gastropods

Pelycidiidae is a family of sea snails, marine gastropod molluscs in the clade Sorbeoconcha.

According to the taxonomy of the Gastropoda by Bouchet & Rocroi (2005) the family Pelycidiidae has no subfamilies.

== Genera ==
- Pelycidion P. Fischer, 1873

Genera brought into synonymy

- † Allixia Cossmann, 1913: synonym of Pelycidion P. Fischer, 1873
- Nannoteretispira Habe, 1961: synonym of Pelycidion P. Fischer, 1873
- Pelecydion [sic]: synonym of Pelycidion P. Fischer, 1873 (misspelling - incorrect subsequent spelling)
