= Pseudotritoniidae =

Scientific classification
- Kingdom: Animalia
- Phylum: Mollusca
- Class: Gastropoda
- Subclass: Caenogastropoda
- Order: Neogastropoda
- Family: †Pseudotritoniidae; Golikov & Starobogatov, 1987

Synonyms
- †Maturifusidae Gründel, 2001

Extinct family of gastropods

Pseudotritoniidae is an extinct family of fossil sea snails, marine gastropod molluscs in the order Neogastropoda.
