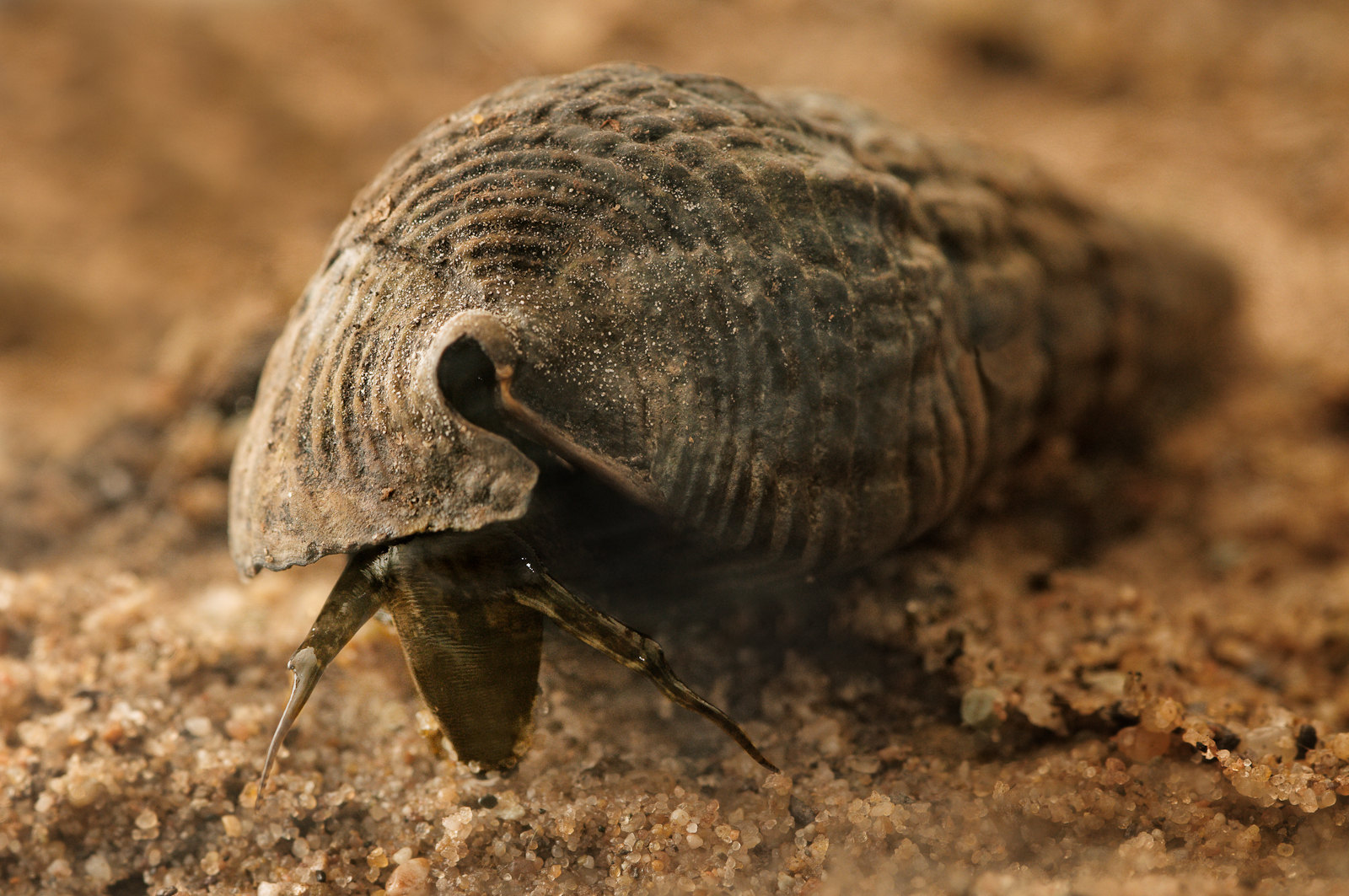
- A live individual of Terebralia palustris, family Potamididae
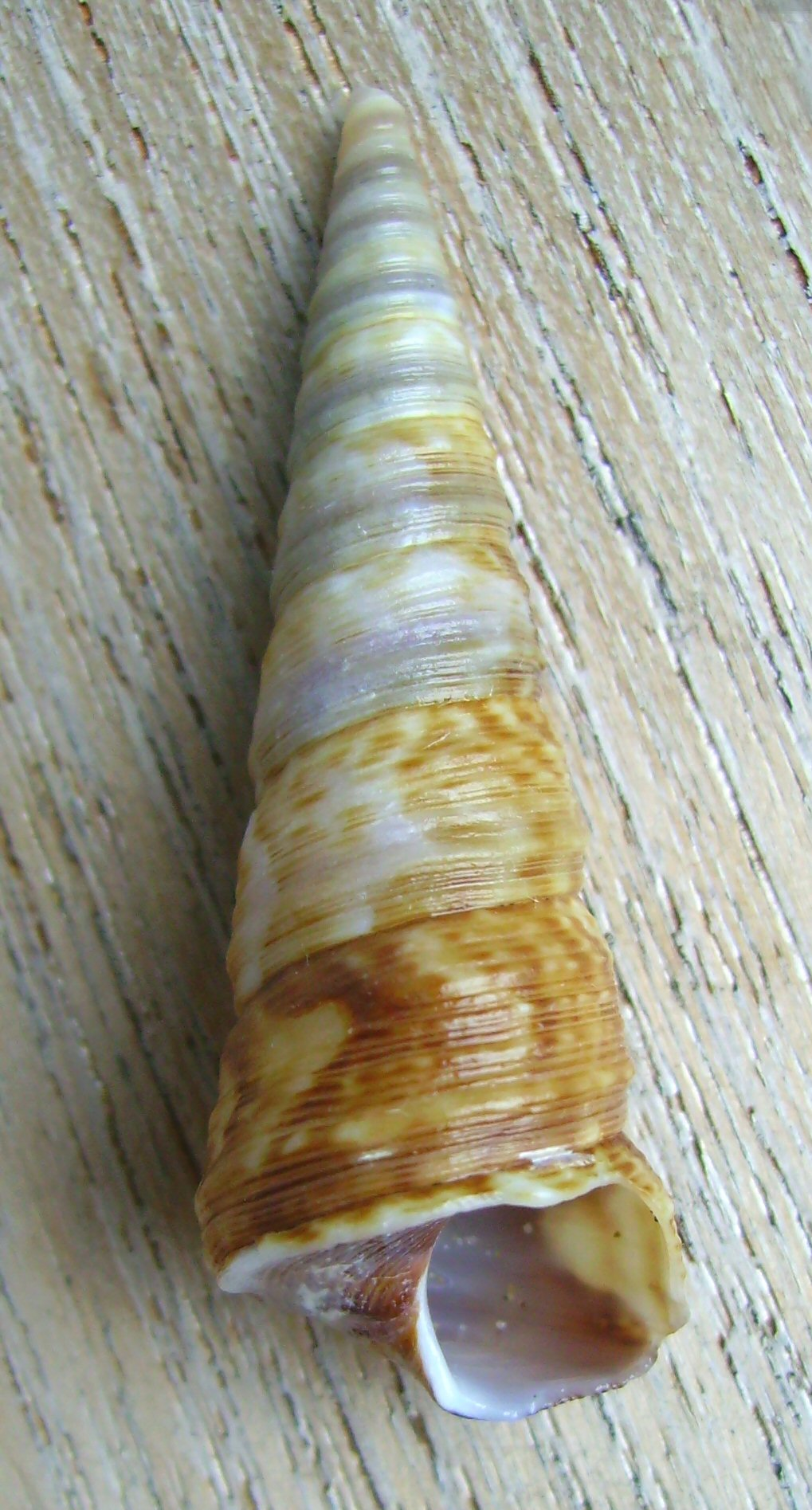
- A beachworn shell of Maoricolpus roseus, family Turritellidae. Most of the body whorl has been broken off in this specimen, possibly by a predator such as a crab.

Scientific classification
- Kingdom: Animalia
- Phylum: Mollusca
- Class: Gastropoda
- Subclass: Caenogastropoda
- Order: incertae sedis
- Superfamily: Cerithioidea; Fleming, 1822

Diversity
- 1092–1164 extant species about 200 extant genera 17 extant families

= Cerithioidea =

Cerithioidea Temporal range: Triassic–Recent

Superfamily of gastropods

The Cerithioidea is a superfamily of marine, brackish water and freshwater gastropod containing more than 200 genera. The Cerithioidea are included unassigned in the subclass Caenogastropoda. The original name of this superfamily was Cerithiacea, in keeping with common superfamily endings at the time.

== Morphology ==
Many cerithioids, as well as some former cerithioids now assigned to other superfamilies, have a "cerithiform" shell. This is a high-spired and regularly coiled shell with a small aperture and a well-developed anterior canal/sinus/notch. There are often strong spiral rows of knobs and tubercles, or axial ridges.

Some families have different shell morphologies. Planaxidae have a lower spire than typical cerithioids. Siliquariidae are uncoiled/irregularly coiled. Turritellidae lack the well-developed anterior canal.

Internally, cerithioids share a number of features, though some are also present in other superfamilies. These are a complex midgut, open pallial gonoducts, aphallate males (i.e. lacking the male copulatory organ), glandular ovipositors and epiathroid/dialyneurous nervous systems.

== Ecology ==
Cerithioidea is a very diverse superfamily. Its species can be found worldwide mainly in tropic and subtropic seas on rocky intertidal shores, seagrass beds and algal fronds, but also in estuarine and freshwater habitats. The freshwater species are found on all continents, except Antarctica. They are dominant members of mangrove forests, estuarine mudflats, fast-flowing rivers and placid lakes.

== Fossil record ==
Their fossil record of this superfamily can be traced back as far as the early Triassic but they began radiating mainly during the Cretaceous.

== Taxonomy ==
The Cerithioidea are presumed to be monophyletic (one lineage). However the phylogenetic relationships between its families are still under investigation because mitochondrial recombinant DNA sequences failed to resolve these questions.

=== 2005 taxonomy ===
According to the Taxonomy of the Gastropoda (Bouchet & Rocroi, 2005), the following families are included in Cerithioidea:

- Amphimelaniidae P. Fischer & Crosse, 1891
- Batillariidae Thiele, 1929 - monophyletic
- † Brachytrematidae Cossmann, 1906
- † Cassiopidae Beurlen, 1967
- Cerithiidae Fleming, 1822 - monophyletic
- Dialidae Kay, 1979
- Diastomatidae Cossman, 1894
- † Eustomatidae Cossmann, 1906
- † Ladinulidae Bandel, 1992
- † Lanascalidae Bandel, 1992
- Litiopidae Gray, 1847
- † Maoraxidae Bandel, Gründel, Maxwell, 2000
- Melanopsidae H. Adams & A. Adams, 1854 - freshwater snails, polyphyletic
- Modulidae P. Fischer, 1884
- Pachychilidae P. Fischer & Crosse, 1892
- Paludomidae Stoliczka, 1868
- Pelycidiidae Ponder & Hall, 1983
- Pickworthiidae Iredale, 1917
- Planaxidae Gray, 1850
- Pleuroceridae P. Fischer, 1885 (1863) - freshwater snails, polyphyletic
- † Popenellidae Bandel, 1992
- Potamididae H. Adams & A. Adams, 1854 - monophyletic
- † Procerithiidae Cossmann, 1906 - If the genus Argyropeza is placed in the Procerithiidae, then this family is no longer exclusively a family of fossils.
- † Propupaspiridae Nützel, Pan & Erwin, 2002
- † Prostyliferidae Bandel, 1992
- Scaliolidae Jousseaume, 1912 - monophyletic
- Semisulcospiridae J. P. E. Morrison, 1952
- Siliquariidae Anton, 1838
- Thiaridae Gill, 1871 (1823) - freshwater snails, polyphyletic
- Turritellidae Lovén, 1847 - monophyletic
- Zemelanopsidae Neiber & Glaubrecht, 2019

(Extinct taxa indicated by a dagger, †.)

It is possible that a further detailed examination may show that the polyphyletic families Melanopsidae and Pleuroceridae are one family. There is also a close phylogenetic relationship between the families Modulidae and Potamididae and between the families Cerithiidae and Litiopidae.

=== 2006 taxonomy ===
Bandel (2006) made numerous changes in Cerithioidea. He classified superfamily Cerithioidea in the clade Cerithimorpha.

Changes include:

superfamily Cerithioidea

- family Bittiidae Cossmann, 1906 - consider Bittiidae in its own family level. It was as subfamily Bittiinae within Cerithiidae by Bouchet & Rocroi, 2005.
- family † Maturifusidae - moved to Cerithioidea from Hypsogastropoda
- family † Canterburyellidae - moved to Cerithioidea from unallocated Sorbeoconcha
- family † Prisciphoridae - moved to Cerithioidea from unallocated Sorbeoconcha
- family † Zardinellopsidae Bandel, 2006 - new family
- family Pachymelaniidae - considered as valid family. It was as synonym of Thiaridae.
- some Pyrguliferidae members (a synonym) are in Paludomidae and some are in Paramelaniidae (instead of Thiaridae)
- family Paramelaniidae at family level (instead of a synonym of Paludomidae)
- and some moves to other taxa

=== 2009 taxonomy ===
- Subfamily Semisulcospirinae within Pleuroceridae was elevated to family level under the name Semisulcospiridae by Strong & Köhler (2009).

=== 2017 Taxonomy ===
In the updated taxonomy by Bouchet et al. (2017)are listed below:

- Batillariidae Thiele, 1929
- † Brachytrematidae Cossmann, 1906
- Cerithiidae Fleming, 1822
- Dialidae Kay, 1979
- Diastomatidae Cossmann, 1894
- † Eustomatidae Cossmann, 1906
- Hemisinidae P. Fischer & Crosse, 1891
- † Ladinulidae Bandel, 1992
- Litiopidae Gray, 1847
- † Maoraxidae Bandel, Gründel & Maxwell, 2000
- Melanopsidae H. Adams & A. Adams, 1854
- † Metacerithiidae Cossmann, 1906
- Modulidae P. Fischer, 1884
- Pachychilidae P. Fischer & Crosse, 1892
- Paludomidae Stoliczka, 1868
- Pelycidiidae Ponder & Hall, 1983
- Pickworthiidae Iredale, 1917
- Planaxidae Gray, 1850
- Pleuroceridae P. Fischer, 1885 (1863)
- † Popenellidae Bandel, 1992
- Potamididae H. Adams & A. Adams, 1854
- † Procerithiidae Cossmann, 1906
- † Propupaspiridae Nützel, Pan & Erwin, 2002
- † Prostyliferidae Bandel, 1992
- Scaliolidae Jousseaume, 1912
- Semisulcospiridae Morrison, 1952
- Siliquariidae Anton, 1838
- Thiaridae Gill, 1871 (1823)
- Turritellidae Lovén, 1847

Unassigned:

- Microstilifer Warén, 1980

The following two extinct families were moved out:

- Lanascalidae Bandel, 1992 †
- Metacerithiidae Cossmann, 1906 †
