= Scaliolidae =

Scientific classification
- Kingdom: Animalia
- Phylum: Mollusca
- Class: Gastropoda
- Subclass: Caenogastropoda
- Order: incertae sedis
- Superfamily: Cerithioidea
- Family: Scaliolidae; F. P. Jousseaume, 1912

Diversity
- about 12 extant species

Synonyms
- See text

Family of gastropods

Scaliolidae, common name scaliolids, is a family of small sea snails, marine gastropod molluscs or micromollusks in the superfamily Cerithioidea, the ceriths and their allies.

Sand grains agglutinate to the teleoconch in the type genus Scaliola.

== 2005 taxonomy ==
According to the taxonomy of the Gastropoda by Bouchet & Rocroi (2005) the family Scaliolidae has no subfamilies and has Obtortionidae Thiele, 1925 and Finellidae Thile, 1929 as its synonyms.

== 2006 taxonomy ==
Bandel (2006) classified Scaliolidae within the superfamily Cerithioidea, but Obtortionidae at its own family level and Finellidae as a subfamily of Bittiidae.

== Genera ==
Genera within the family Scaliolidae include:

- Finella A. Adams, 1860 - synonyms: Eufenella Kuroda & Habe, 1952; Fenella A. Adams, 1864; Obtortio Hedley, 1899
- Scaliola A. Adams, 1860 - type genus of the family Scaliolidae
