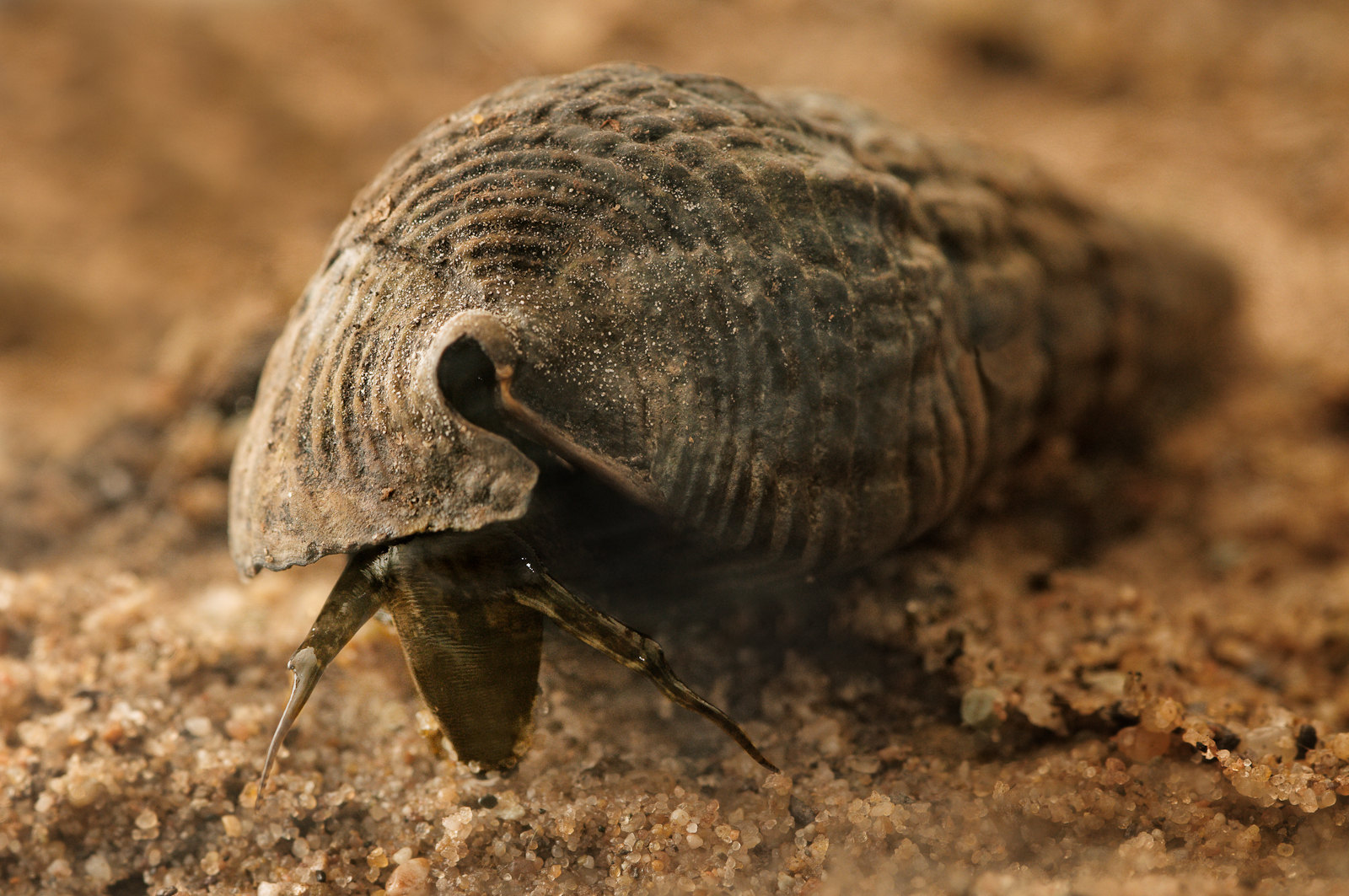
- A head-on view of a live individual of Terebralia palustris, family Potamididae
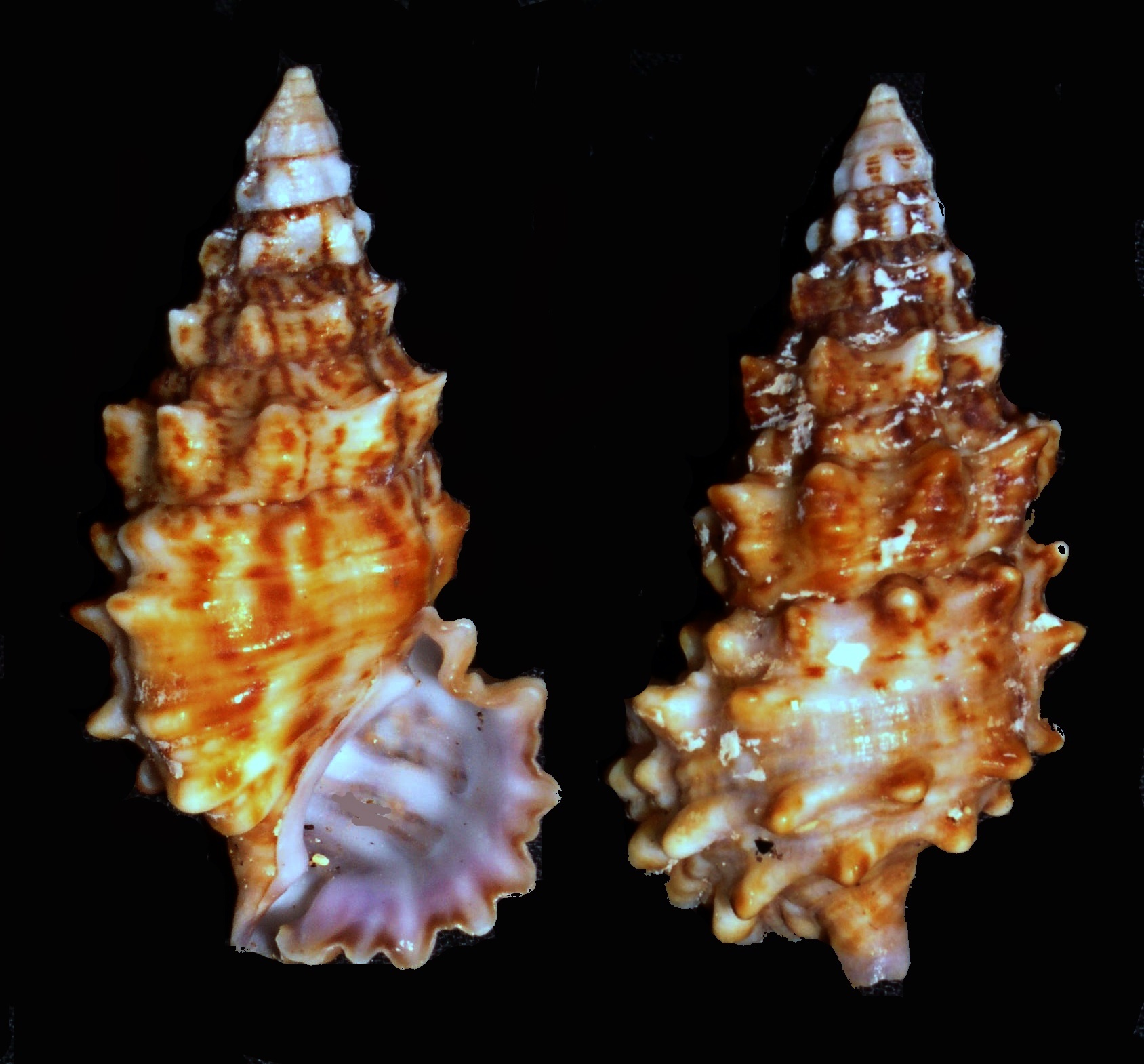
- Two views of a shell of Cerithium echinatum, family Cerithiidae

Scientific classification
- Kingdom: Animalia
- Phylum: Mollusca
- Class: Gastropoda
- Subclass: Caenogastropoda
- Subterclass: Sorbeoconcha (Ponder & Lindberg, 1997)

= Sorbeoconcha =

Clade of gastropods

Sorbeoconcha is a taxonomic clade of snails, i.e. gastropods, mainly marine species with gills and opercula, within the clade Caenogastropoda.

The taxon Sorbeoconcha was named by Winston Ponder and David R. Lindberg in 1997.

== Taxonomy ==
=== 1997 taxonomy ===
According to the older taxonomy by Ponder and Lindberg the suborders within the order Sorbeoconcha are:

- Discopoda P. Fischer, 1884
- Murchisoniina Cox & Knight, 1960
- Hypsogastropoda Ponder & Lindberg, 1997
- Cerithiimorpha Golikov & Starobogatov, 1975

=== 2005 taxonomy ===
In the taxonomy by Bouchet & Rocroi (2005), the clade Sorbeoconcha was declared a taxon of unspecified rank, within the clade Caenogastropoda.

It comprises the superfamily Cerithioidea, the superfamily Campaniloidea, the informal group Ptenoglossa and the clade Neogastropoda.

The following families were not allocated to a superfamily:

- † Acanthonematidae Wenz, 1938
- † Canterburyellidae Bandel, Gründel & Maxwell, 2000
- Globocornidae Espinosa & Ortea, 2010
- † Prisciphoridae Bandel, Gründel & Maxwell, 2000

The World Register of Marine Species considers Sorbeoconcha an alternate representation of Caenogastropoda and gives the following reasoning:

Sorbeoconcha should include [Cerithioidea + Campaniloidea + all Hypsogastropoda (i.e. the remaining Caenogastropoda)], see definition in Ponder & Lindberg, 1997: 225, not only [Cerithioidea + Campaniloidea] as suggested by the indent pattern in Bouchet & Rocroi.

Neotaenioglossa Haller, 1892 suggested in Ruud Bank’s draft for Fauna Europaea is not retained because it would need severe emendation to remove Pyramidellids, Cerithioids, etc.. included in its original definition, and therefore would be too far from Haller's concept if it were to fit the concept of Sorbeoconcha.

Although cladistically sound, the taxon Sorbeoconcha is skipped in the classification scheme because (1) ten years after its publication, the name still sounds unfamiliar to most and (2) it is not very helpful in the classification because it includes the bulk of Caenogastropoda (only keeping out small stem groups Abyssochrysidae, Provannidae, and the architaenioglossate taxa). This is not final, opinions are welcome.

== See also ==
- Hypsogastropoda
