= Cerithiimorpha =

Former suborder of marine gastropods within the Sorbeoconcha

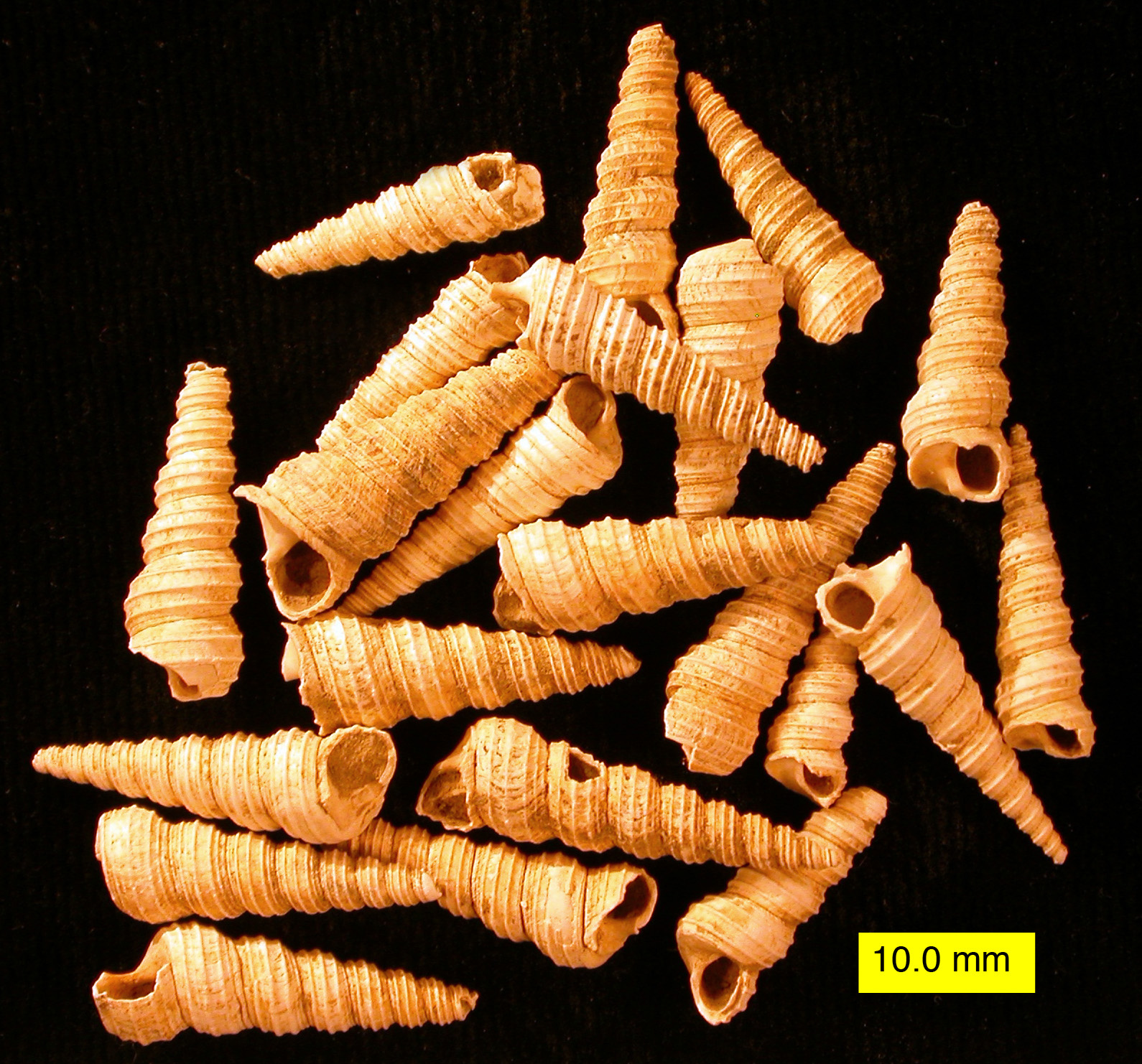
Turritella cingulifera from the Pliocene of Cyprus

The Cerithiimorpha was a suborder of marine gastropods within the Sorbeoconcha. This taxon is no longer valid according to the current taxonomy of Bouchet and Rocroi.

The previous classification system was as follows:

- subclassis = Orthogastropoda
- infraclassis = Apogastropoda
- superordo = Caenogastropoda
- ordo = Sorbeoconcha
- subordo = Cerithiimorpha

== Previous taxonomy ==
During the taxon's use, not all taxonomists agreed upon its structure. The listing below gives one interpretation. For example, in another accepted classification, the Campaniloidea and Cerithioidea were separated in a suborder named Discopoda.

- Campaniloidea
  - Campanilidae
  - Plesiotrochidae
- Cerithioidea
  - Batillariidae
  - Brachytremidae
  - †Canterburyellidae
  - Cassiopidae
  - Cerithiidae
  - Dialidae
  - Diastomidae
  - Eoptychiidae
  - Eustomidae
  - Faxiidae
  - Lavigeriidae
  - Litiopidae
  - †Maoraxidae
  - Melanopsidae
  - Modulidae
  - Pachychilidae
  - Pachymelaniidae
  - Pareoridae
  - Pianaridae
  - Planaxidae
  - Potamididae
  - Procerithiidae
  - Pseudamaurinidae
  - Scaliolidae
  - Siliquariidae
  - Syrnolopsidae
  - Tenagodidae
  - Terebrellidae - not a valid name
  - Thiaridae
  - Turritellidae
  - Turritellopsidae
- Spationematoidea
  - Spanionematidae
  - Stephanozygidae

(Extinct taxa indicated by a dagger, †.)
