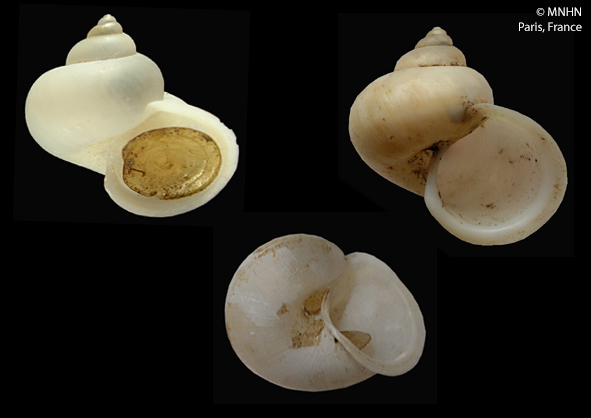
- Shell of Leptopoma perlucidum (specimen at MNHN, Paris)

Scientific classification
- Kingdom: Animalia
- Phylum: Mollusca
- Class: Gastropoda
- Subclass: Caenogastropoda
- Order: Architaenioglossa
- Family: Cyclophoridae
- Genus: Leptopoma
- Species: L. perlucidum

Binomial name
- Leptopoma perlucidum (Grateloup, 1840)

Synonyms
- 25 synonyms: Cyclostoma nitidum Sowerby, G.B. II, 1843 (junior synonym); Cyclostoma pellucida Grateloup, 1840 (typographic error on page 454 for "perlucidum"; not an available name); Cyclostoma perlucida Grateloup, 1840 (original combination); Cyclostoma vitreum Quoy & Gaimard, 1832 (Invalid: junior homonym of Cyclostoma vitreum Draparnaud, 1801; considered as a distinct species in the Solomon Islands by Delsaerdt (2016)); Cyclostoma vitreum Lesson, 1831 (Invalid: junior homonym of Cyclostoma vitreum Draparnaud, 1801); Leptopoma (Leptopoma) cinctellum L. Pfeiffer, 1862 (junior synonym); Leptopoma (Leptopoma) lowi L. Pfeiffer, 1858 (junior synonym); Leptopoma (Leptopoma) vitreum (Lesson, 1831)· accepted, alternate representation; Leptopoma (Leptopoma) vitreum var. lacteum Kobelt, 1886 (junior synonym); Leptopoma (Leptopoma) vitreum var. levis Hidalgo, 1886 (junior synonym); Leptopoma cinctellum L. Pfeiffer, 1862 (junior synonym); Leptopoma lowi L. Pfeiffer, 1858 (junior synonym); Leptopoma nitidum (Sowerby, G.B. II, 1843) (junior synonym); Leptopoma nitidum faber Iredale, 1941 (junior synonym); Leptopoma nitidum sanctum Iredale, 1943 (junior synonym); Leptopoma nitidum ultra Iredale, 1937 (junior synonym); Leptopoma nitidum weeksi Bartsch, 1919 (junior synonym); Leptopoma perlucida (Grateloup, 1840) (incorrect gender of species name); Leptopoma perlucidum levis Hidalgo, 1886 (junior synonym); Leptopoma perlucidum var. lacteum Kobelt, 1886 (basionym); Leptopoma vitrea (Lesson, 1831) (incorrect gender of species name); Leptopoma vitreum (Lesson, 1831) (invalid: based on a preoccupied original name); Leptopoma vitreum lacteum Kobelt, 1886 (junior synonym); Leptopoma vitreum var. lacteum Kobelt, 1886 (original rank); Leptopoma vitreum var. levis Hidalgo, 1886 (basionym)

= Leptopoma perlucidum =

Species of mollusc

Leptopoma perlucidum is a species of land snail with a gill and an operculum, a terrestrial gastropod mollusk in the family Cyclophoridae.

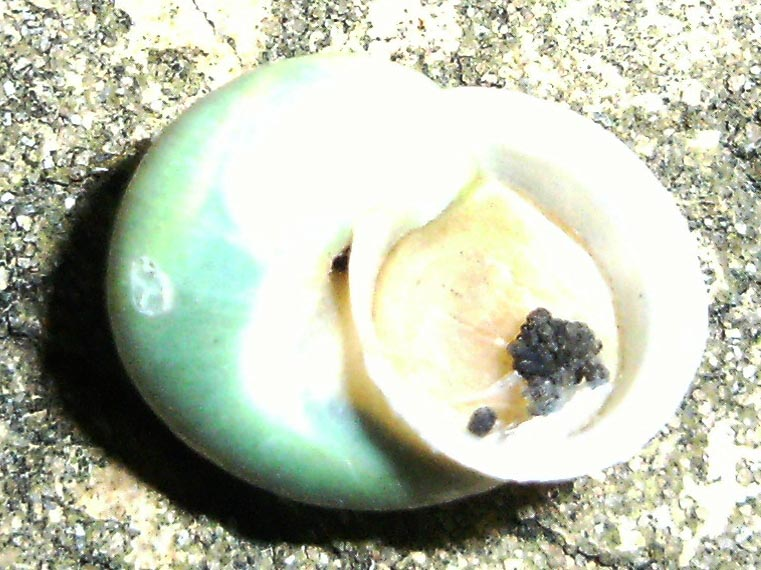
Apertural view of the shell of Leptopoma perlucidum

== Distribution ==
This species occurs in Indonesia, Sabah (Malaysia), the Philippines, the Solomon Islands and Australia.

== Description ==
The shell width and height is about 14 mm (0.6 in) in females and 13 mm (0.5 in) in males. The color of the shell is actually translucently milky-white, and the green color is from the mantle.
