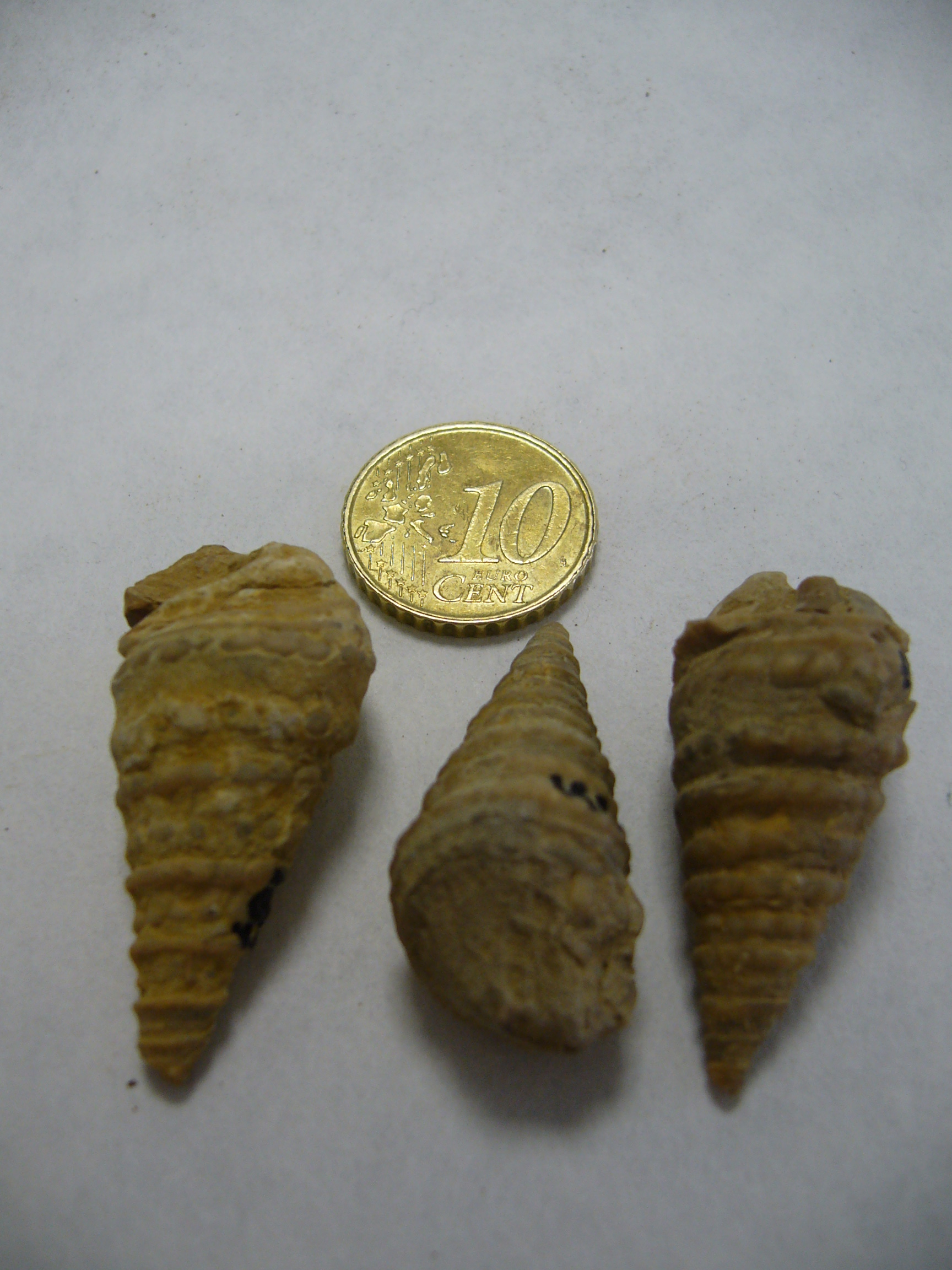
- Three shells of Cassiope luxani, the coin is nearly 20 mm in diameter

Scientific classification
- Kingdom: Animalia
- Phylum: Mollusca
- Class: Gastropoda
- Subclass: Caenogastropoda
- Superorder: Cerithiimorpha
- Family: †Cassiopidae Beurlen, 1967

Synonyms
- Glauconiidae Pchelintsev, 1953 (inv.)

= Cassiopidae =

Extinct family of gastropods

†Cassiopidae is an extinct family of sea snails, marine gastropod molluscs in the superorder Cerithiimorpha

According to the taxonomy of the Gastropoda by Bouchet & Rocroi (2005) the family Cassiopidae has no subfamilies.
