= Mating of gastropods =

Mating habits of the class Gastropoda

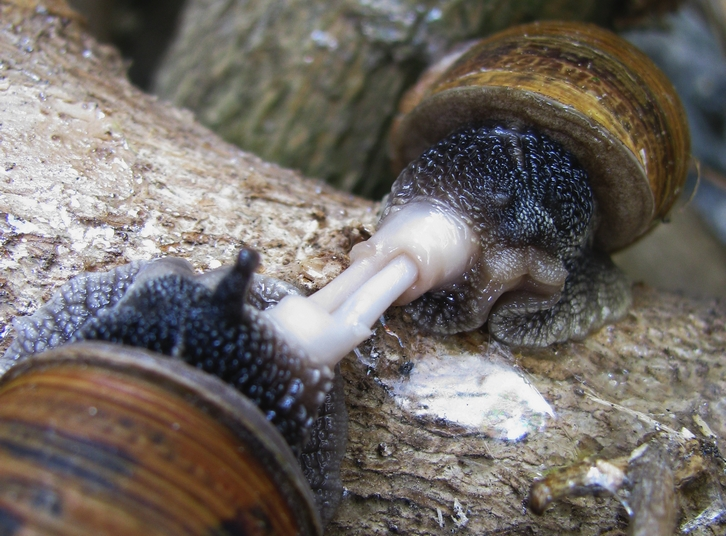
Mating Cornu aspersum garden snails

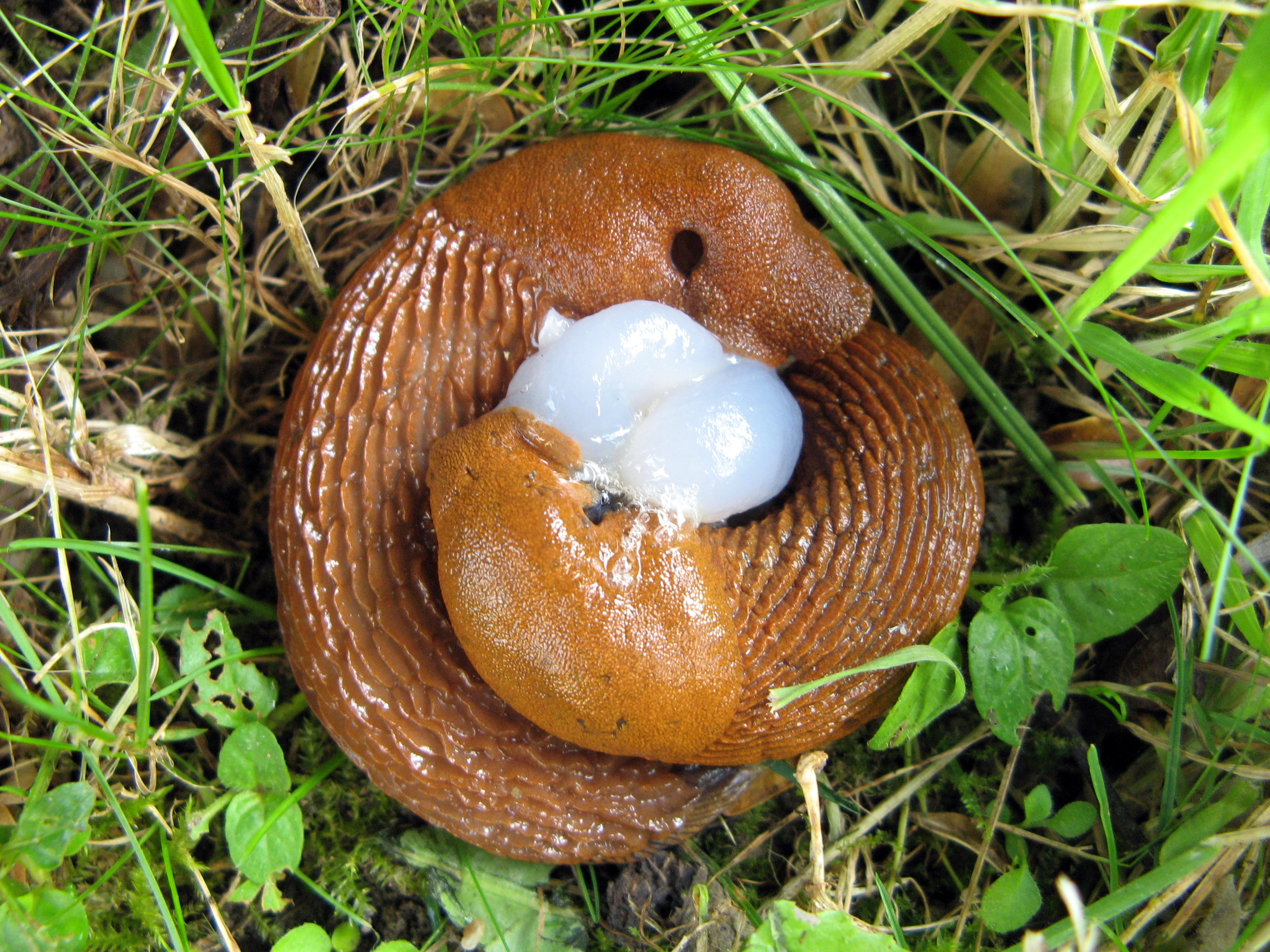
A mating pair of Arion vulgaris; each partner has everted a part of the oviduct, whilst spermatophores are being exchanged internally

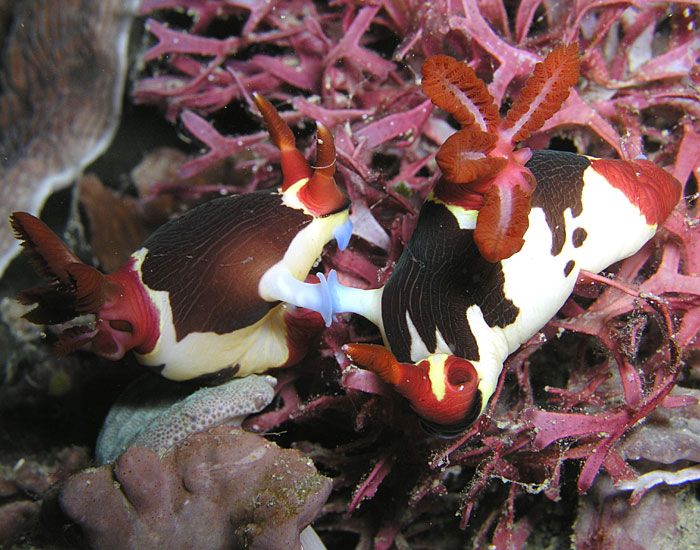
The nudibranch sea slug Nembrotha rutilans, a mating pair

The mating of gastropods is a vast and varied topic, because the taxonomic class Gastropoda is very large and diverse, a group comprising sea snails and sea slugs, freshwater snails and land snails and slugs. Gastropods are second only to the class Insecta in terms of total number of species. Some gastropods have separate sexes, others are hermaphroditic. Some hermaphroditic groups have simultaneous hermaphroditism, whereas some sequential hermaphroditism. In addition, numerous very different mating strategies are used within different taxa.

This article currently focuses primarily on the mating habits of air-breathing terrestrial slugs. Land slugs can be thought of as land snails that over evolutionary time have either lost the shell completely, have a very reduced external shell, or have retained only internal remnants of a shell. Land slugs are a highly polyphyletic group, which means that many land slug families are not at all closely related to one another.

The majority of land slugs are simultaneous hermaphrodites, meaning they possess both male and female reproductive organs that are functional at the same time. Some species regularly self-fertilise. Uniparental reproduction may also occur by apomixis, an asexual process.

For the most part, however, land slugs do mate: they find partners, and engage in elaborate courtship rituals before actual sperm transfer takes place. It is common for slugs to mate in a simultaneous reciprocal manner, as occurs in the monophyletic groups Limacoidea and Philomycidae. Limacoidea comprises the family Limacidae (the keelback slugs) and the largest genus of slugs, Deroceras, which contains over 100 known species. Sperm transfer may be external (as in Deroceras) or internal (as in Ariolimax).

== Sexual strategy ==
When it comes to the mating behaviour of simultaneous hermaphrodites such as pulmonate land snails and pulmonate land slugs, as well as opisthobranch sea snails and opisthobranch sea slugs, there is the question of which sexual role or roles an individual will adopt in a mating encounter. If the individuals involved both have a preference for the same sexual role, then their mating interests are inherently incompatible. Further conflicts arise because a hermaphroditic individual may not necessarily use received sperm; it may use another partner's, or self-fertilise. According to risk-averse models, when this is the case, it would be more prudent for an individual to invest in eggs. However, alternative views state that the male role is preferred, as males benefit more from multiple matings than females do. Neither strategy is evolutionarily stable, as both sex roles are required for successful reproduction.

Because sperm digestion in land slugs reduces the likelihood of a given set of sperm fertilising the partner's eggs, increased sperm investment is selected for. This can lead to a co-evolutionary cycle in which the amount of sperm digested and male allocation both increase until eventually, male and female gametes are equally invested in. The larger and more costly ejaculates become, the more reciprocal sperm transfer is favoured, as each slug receives compensation for its investment. Reciprocity, either simultaneous or serial, appears to alleviate the sexual role conflict, and is a feature of most slug matings.

== Finding a mate ==
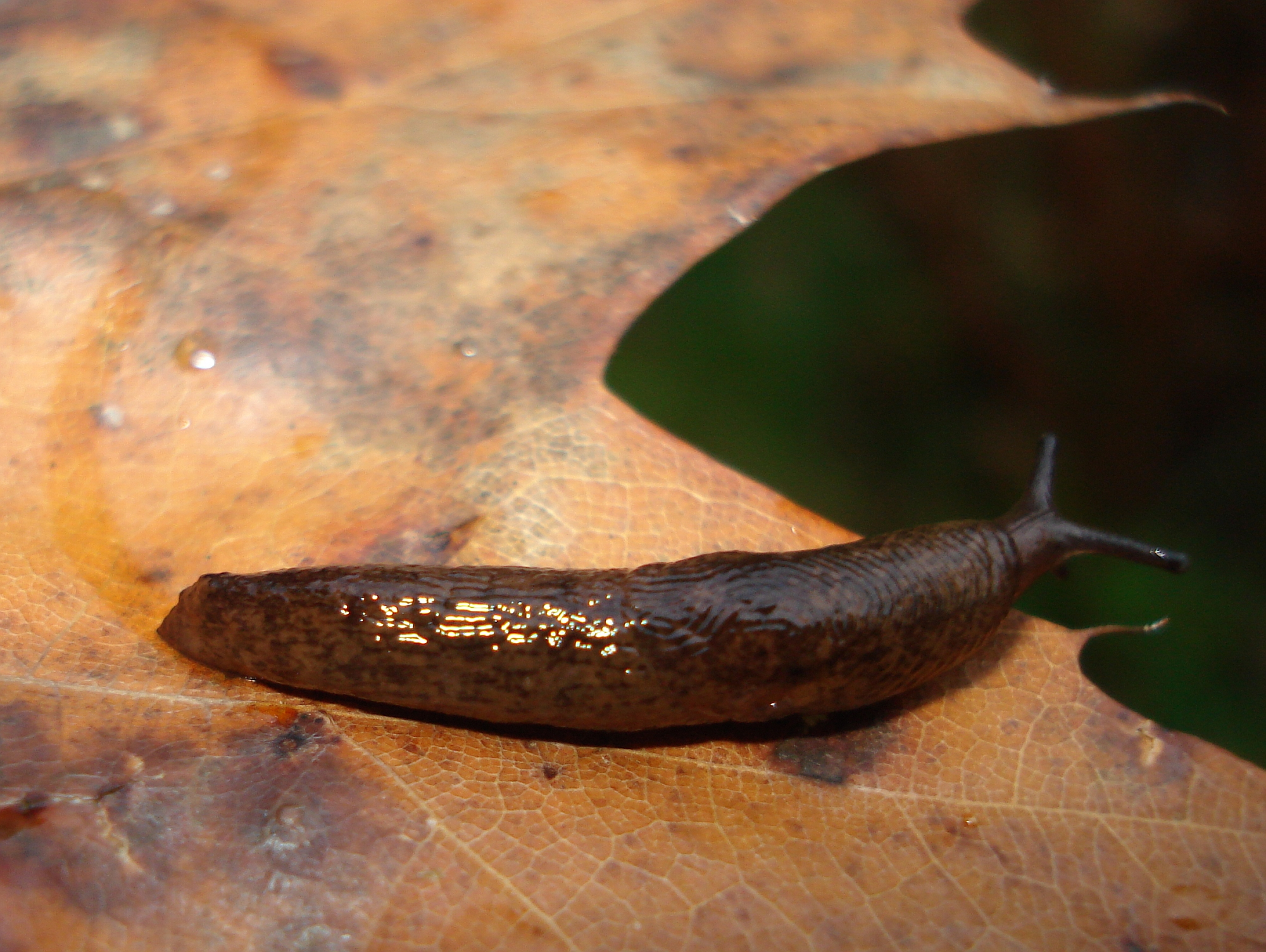
Deroceras panormitanum leaving behind a mucus trail.

As land gastropods such as land snails and land slugs have no sense of hearing and very limited vision, they rely heavily on chemoception, primarily olfaction, and tactile perception. Mate location is also greatly mediated by airborne chemicals. Slugs often raise their head at the detection of pheromones in the air, and then turn to orient themselves and crawl towards the perceived source. Many slugs also exhibit some degree of mucus-trail-following in order to locate a mate. Trail following may be an alternative or complementary strategy to airborne cues, and can constitute a major part of precourtship behaviour.

Using mucus trails to find a mate involves the discrimination between conspecific and heterospecific trails. It is therefore advantageous to incorporate species specific cues into trails to facilitate mate finding. In some species, such as banana slugs (Ariolimax), pheromones are secreted together with the mucus to attract mates. It may even be possible for a follower to perform a quality assessment of a potential mate based on its mucus trail. The mucus may reveal information on body size or parasite infection, giving an insight into fecundity. A larger size suggests a slug is highly fertile, whereas parasitism could mean it suffers from decreased egg production or even sterility.

Trail following is a complex behavioural pattern which usually involves the active participation of both slugs. The follower keeps very close to the leader once they are in proximity. In species with pronounced trail following, such as Deroceras panormitanum, the leader flattens its tail laterally and waves it from side to side in front of the follower. It is not yet known whether tail waving is a visual cue or whether it wafts chemical attractants in the direction of the follower. Sometimes, the tail is waved between the follower's tentacles and occasionally makes contact, contributing to recognition between the slugs. The leading slug seemingly pauses to wait for the follower, tail waving, if the follower falls too far behind.

== Courtship ==
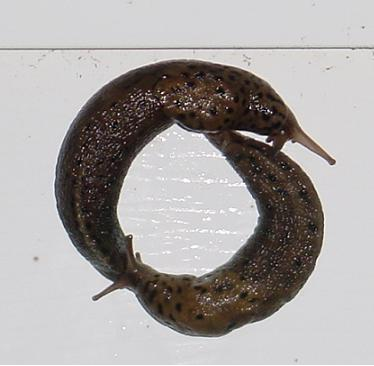
Two individuals of Limax maximus circling

Once a mate is found, land slugs undergo a prolonged courtship phase prior to copulation. Courtship can and usually does last for several hours. The two individuals get into position along the periphery of an imaginary circle with their heads towards the other's tail, and circle one another. The slugs crawl in a clockwise direction so that their right sides, containing the genital pores, continually face each other. This circling may serve to assess whether the other is ready to mate; the speed of circling generally decreases as courtship progresses. The slugs then lie close together, remaining in the antiparallel configuration. Each protrudes from its genital pore a sarcobelum, a highly manoeuvrable penile structure, with which it strokes its mate.

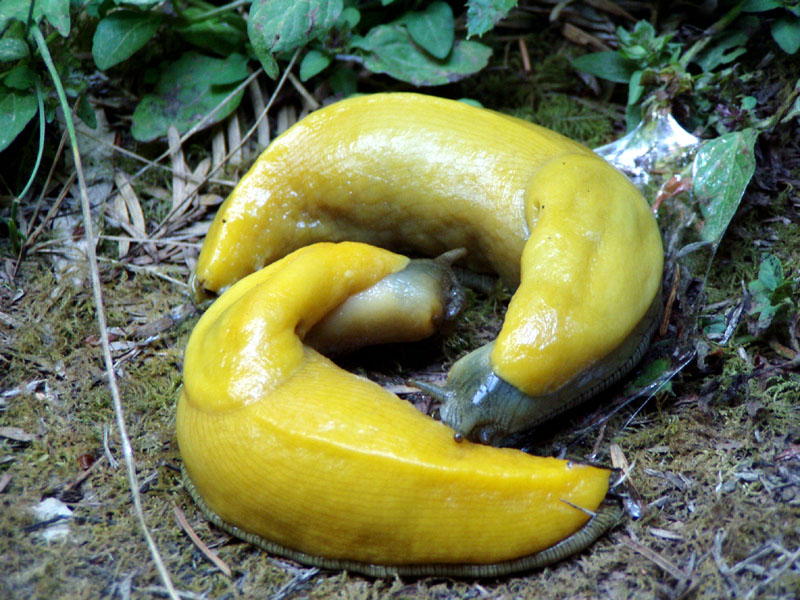
A pair of banana slugs in antiparallel configuration prior to mating.

Secretions, presumably from the glandular part of the penis wall, are probably transferred by the sarcobela during this mutual stroking. These secretions have several possible functions, including physiological stimulation and synchronisation, partner labelling or manipulation. Labelling may benefit the donor by helping it to avoid mating with individuals it has already mated with. Alternatively or additionally, labelling may serve as an indication to conspecifics that this individual has recently mated and therefore should be avoided, either because its sperm reserves are possibly depleted or, more likely, because of sperm competition. In the latter case, the secretion transferrer's risk of being subjected to sperm competition is also reduced. Besides labelling, another possibility is that the secretion is absorbed by the partner, in whom it acts as a manipulative allohormone. An allohormone is a substance that is transferred from one member of a species to another and that "induces a direct behavioural or physiological response". The secretion may then cause the recipient to refrain from mating with additional partners, to uptake more of the donor's sperm and to digest less of it, or to increase egg fertilisation and laying using the donated sperm. For more information on one use of this kind of hormone, see the article love dart.

Species differ in the way stroking occurs and the duration of stroking, but all species get progressively closer during courtship and stroking intensity increases until it stops just before the start of mating. At this point, the sarcobela slightly contract and point upwards. The anterior parts of the slugs swell and roll slightly over to the left. There may be biting and touching around the genital pore areas with mouths and tentacles, as well as mutual head swinging. The slugs press their genital pores against each other and pull their mantles backwards. It is also during courtship that the ejaculate is prepared; sperm flows from storage into the penis and, in some species, is assembled into packages such as spermatophores.

=== Love darts ===
In the final stages of courtship, some species of land slugs and land snails shoot calcareous or chitinous love darts into each other's bodies. Only a subset of those species that mate face to face in a simultaneous reciprocal manner bear darts. Both slugs in a mating shoot at each other unless a dart is unavailable, for example because it is being regenerated after a recent mating. Most research into love darts has been performed on the common garden snail, in which it has been shown that dart shooting increases paternal reproductive success through the delivery of mucus which promotes sperm storage rather than digestion in the dart recipient. Control of sperm movement is achieved through reconfiguration of the recipient's copulatory canal prior to sperm receipt. It is only after dart shooting that actual mating takes place.

== Mating ==
Mating refers to the phase of sperm transfer and lasts from the beginning of penis eversion to the moment the genitalia lose contact with the other slug. Duration varies considerably between slug species but sudden eversions and very brief transfers are most common. Sperm transfer can be simultaneously reciprocal or unilateral, and external (as in Deroceras) or internal (as in Ariolimax). Received sperm is either digested or used for the fertilisation of eggs.

=== Simultaneous reciprocal mating versus unilateral mating ===
In simultaneous reciprocal mating, both slugs act as males and females at the same time. This manner of mating requires that the pair of genitalia be exactly opposed prior to copulation, a task made difficult in slugs as they have no sense of hearing and very limited vision. Hence, they rely heavily on chemoception and contact sensation. There is usually an exchange of sperm, but one-way sperm transfer can occur in certain cases.

In unilateral mating, each individual has a defined sexual role: one acts as a male and donates sperm while the other acts as a female and receives it. The slugs often switch roles after sperm transfer for a second round of mating. Hence, as with simultaneous reciprocal mating, a mutual exchange of sperm usually but not always occurs.

=== External sperm transfer ===
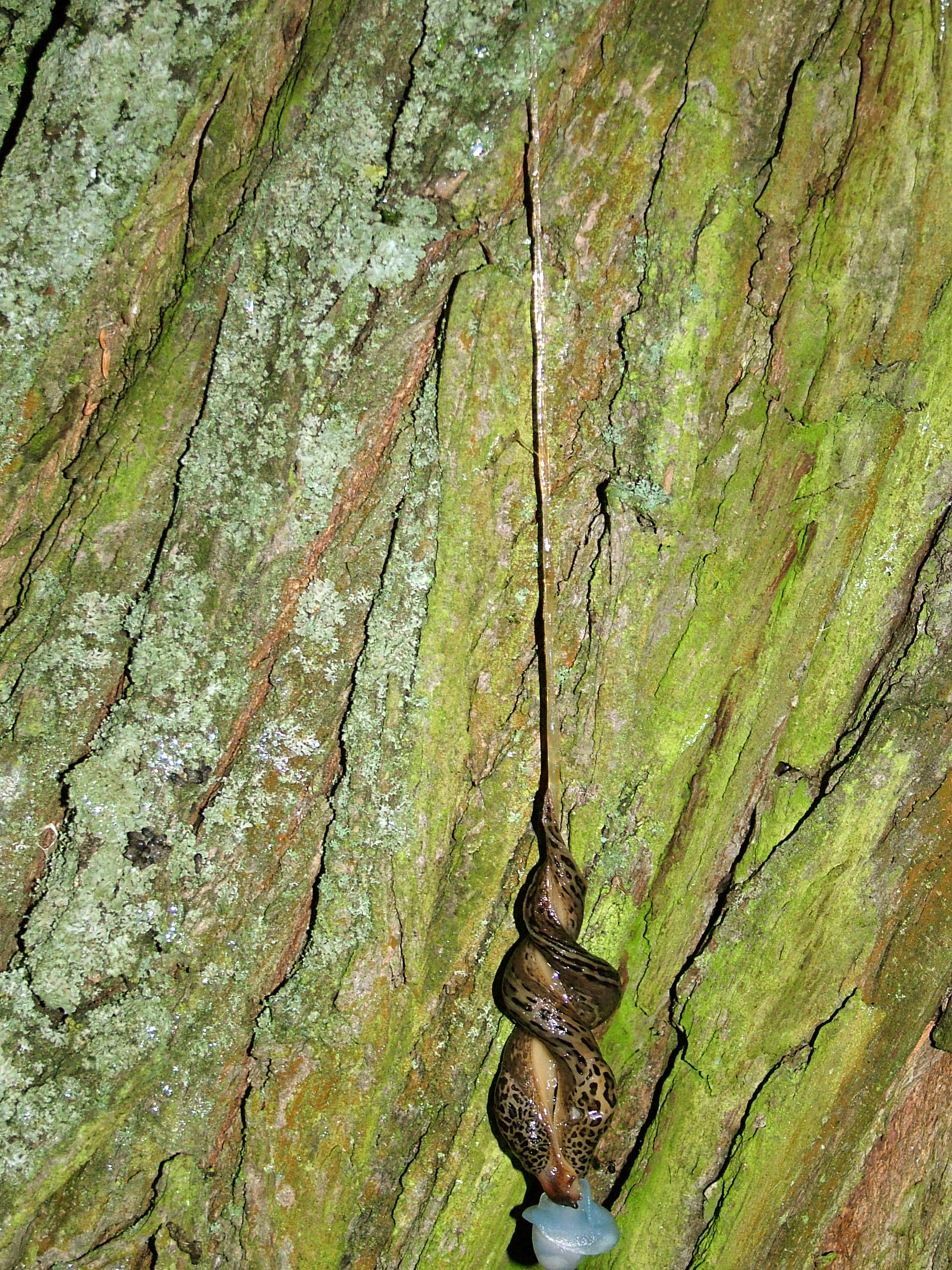
Aerial mating with intertwined penises and external sperm transfer in Limax maximus.

During external sperm exchange, the penis of the donor slug is everted along with its ejaculate. The everted penis is several fold larger than its usual size, and appears as a bulbous, transparent structure. The ejaculate, an amorphous soft mass, is transferred onto the surface of the receiver slug's everted penis. At least one species, the grey field slug (Deroceras reticulatum), shows a primitive degree of sperm packaging. The retraction of the receiver's penis then takes the ejaculate with it. In most cases, both partners donate and receive simultaneously via intertwined penises; unilateral sperm transfer is only an occasional occurrence. Entwinement is allowed by the curvature present in slug penises; close entwinement aids successful sperm exchange, which occurs at the peak of penis eversion. When an individual of a species with external sperm transfer lacks a penis, it can still reproduce uniparenterally, such as by self-fertilisation, provided it possesses the other components of a normal reproductive system. Uniparental reproduction has been observed in the marsh slug (Deroceras laeve).

When an appending penial gland, an accessory structure part of the male reproductive system, is present, it is also briefly everted during mating. If large enough, it is spread over the partner's body. This can occur along with or after sperm exchange. The penial gland is filled during early courtship and its secretions are transferred onto the skin of the partner slug. These secretions, like those of the sarcobelum during courtship, have several possible functions including acting as an allohormone which manipulates the partner to increase chances of paternity. This may be achieved through inhibiting additional mating, changing sperm transport or storage, or increasing egg laying in the partner.

Penis retraction is usually a fast process, although much slower than eversion. It is common for both slugs to retract their penises simultaneously, pumping and rocking the anterior parts of their body while they do so. They separate and crawl away from each other as soon as their genitals are untangled. After this, it is common for one or both slugs to engage in mucus consumption; they may return to the mating site and lick the mucus off the ground, or lick it from their own body surface. However, there is much intraspecific variation.

An extraordinary example of external sperm transfer is given by the great grey slug (Limax maximus). A pair of slugs climb a tree or wall to an overhang and suspend together head down from a 10–25 cm long mucus strand before everting their penises and exchanging sperm in mid air. Evolutionary explanations for this behaviour are unclear.

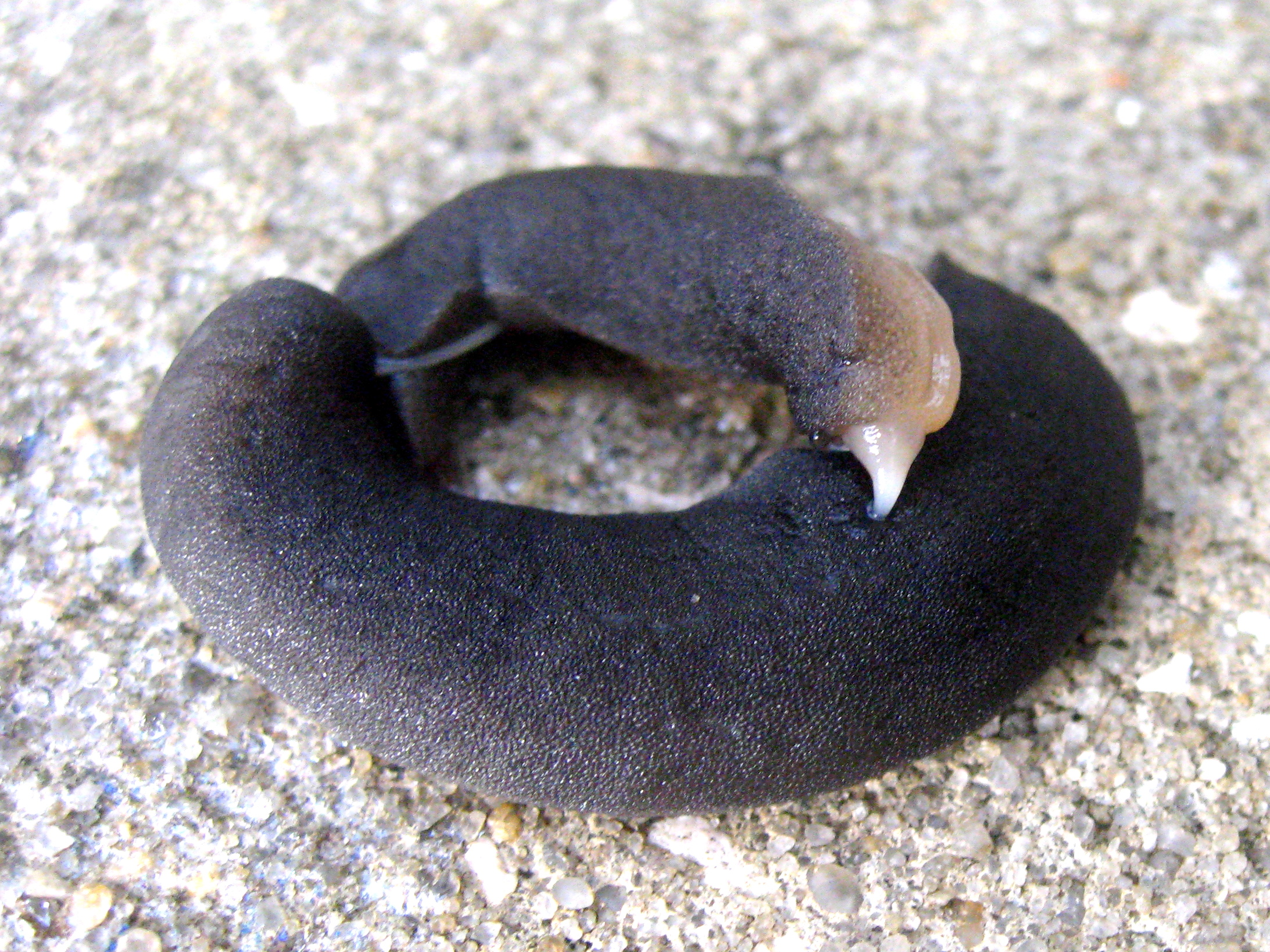
Belocaulus angustipes mating with intromission and internal sperm exchange.

=== Internal sperm transfer ===
In other cases, sperm transfer is internal and takes place by inserting the everted penis into the partner slug. The sperm is conveyed via sperm packets or spermatophores into the recipient's spermatheca duct. and then released from the tail of the spermatophore. Only a very small percentage escape to higher regions of the female reproductive system for storage (in the spermatheca) and later fertilisation. Intromission is simultaneously reciprocal in some species such as Ariolimax dolichophallus and unilateral in others such as Ariolimax californicus

=== Apophallation ===
After sperm transfer a process termed apophallation, or penis amputation, may take place. This is a lengthy process whereby the penis of one or both slugs is chewed off using the radula. In the case where one penis is chewed off, this is usually done by the other slug. A replacement penis does not grow back. Apophallation is most widely found in Ariolimax species, which have internal sperm exchange. In these slugs, apophallation is only an occasional occurrence which follows a period of struggle and pulling by the owner. This suggests it is a 'last resort' if the penis becomes stuck in the genital tract of the partner slug. Once a penis is severed, it is usually eaten by the partner. The reason the penis gets eaten is unclear, although it could simply be a source of nutrients. Apophallation may be made necessary in order for separation to occur by the partner tightly gripping the penis via a special muscle of the female reproductive tract. Apophallation may benefit the amputator because it prevents the amputee from mating again in the near future, which would result in sperm competition. The amputee is at least prevented from mating in the future as a male, which could divert resources from producing eggs with the amputator's sperm.

In addition to Ariolimax species, autoapophallation (self-amputation) has been documented in Deroceras laeve. Here, it is a regular part of mating, although the penis does not get trapped in the other slug (as there is external sperm transfer), and may occur because the amputee's penis retraction ability has been inhibited by the partner by transfer of a secretion. As a result, these individuals can no longer mate, and are only able to reproduce uniparentally. Aphallic individuals of Ariolimax species are still able to mate, but only as females, as they have intromission and internal sperm exchange.

== Freshwater snail sexual selection ==
The freshwater snail Physa acuta is a self-fertile organism that can be exposed either to strong sexual selection or to self-fertilization depending on its mode of reproduction. Noel et al. used Physa acuta to experimentally determine whether accumulation of deleterious mutations is avoided by inbreeding populations of the snail, as well as by outbreeding populations undergoing sexual reproduction. Inbreeding promotes the homozygous expression of deleterious recessive mutations in progeny, thus exposing these mutations to selective elimination because of their deleterious effect on the progeny. Outbreeding sexual reproduction allows females to select male mating partners with smaller mutation loads thus also leading to a reduction of deleterious mutations in progeny. Noel et al. concluded that both outbred and inbred populations of Physa acuta can efficiently purge deleterious mutations.

== Mating of marine gastropods ==
For example, in mating of sea slugs Siphopteron quadrispinosum there occur traumatic mating.

During mating of Aplysiidae chains of mating slugs may occur.

== See also ==
- Reproductive system of gastropods
