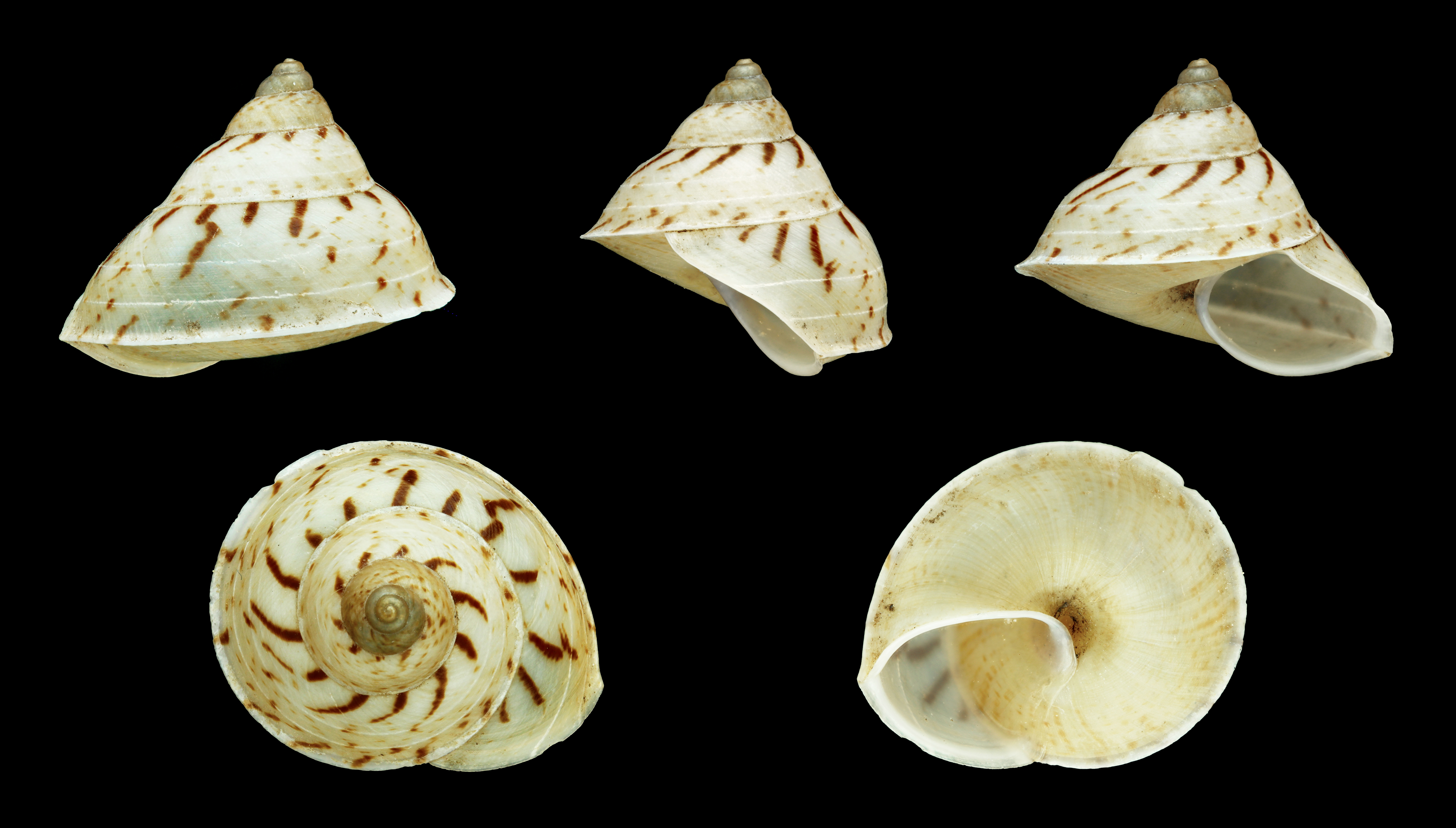
- Leptopoma helicoides (Grateloupe, 1840)

Scientific classification
- Domain: Eukaryota
- Kingdom: Animalia
- Phylum: Mollusca
- Class: Gastropoda
- Subclass: Caenogastropoda
- Order: Architaenioglossa
- Superfamily: Cyclophoroidea
- Family: Cyclophoridae
- Genus: Leptopoma; Pfeiffer, 1847

Type species
- Turbo marginellus Gmelin, 1791

Synonyms
- Cyclostoma (Leptopoma) L. Pfeiffer, 1847 (unaccepted rank); Dermatocera H. Adams & A. Adams, 1855 (junior synonym); Leptopoma (Dermatocera) H. Adams & A. Adams, 1855 (superseded combination); Leptopoma (Entochilus) Möllendorff & Kobelt, 1897· accepted, alternate representation; Leptopoma (Leptopoma) L. Pfeiffer, 1847· accepted, alternate representation; Leptopoma (Leucoptychia) Crosse, 1878· accepted, alternate representation; Leptopoma (Trocholeptopoma) Möllendorff & Kobelt, 1897· accepted, alternate representation; Leucoptychia Crosse, 1878 (original rank)

= Leptopoma =

Genus of gastropods

Leptopoma is a genus of land snails with a gill and an operculum, terrestrial gastropod mollusks in the family Cyclophoridae.

== Species ==
Species within the genus Leptopoma include:

- Leptopoma abbasi Thach, 2017
- Leptopoma achatinum Crosse, 1865
- Leptopoma acuminatum (G. B. Sowerby I, 1843)
- Leptopoma altum Möllendorff, 1897
- Leptopoma amaliae Kobelt, 1886
- Leptopoma annamiticum Möllendorff, 1900
- Leptopoma antonii Kobelt, 1886
- Leptopoma apicale Tapparone Canefri, 1883
- Leptopoma apicatum Benson, 1856
- Leptopoma approximans Kobelt, 1886
- Leptopoma aspirans Benson, 1856
- Leptopoma atricapillum (G. B. Sowerby I, 1843)
- Leptopoma aureum Quadras & Möllendorff, 1896
- Leptopoma bicolor (L. Pfeiffer, 1854)
- Leptopoma bipartitum Kobelt, 1886
- Leptopoma bodjoense E. A. Smith, 1888
- Leptopoma boettgeri (Möllendorff, 1887)
- Leptopoma boholense Kobelt, 1886
- Leptopoma bourguignati Issel, 1874
- Leptopoma caroli Dohrn, 1862
- Leptopoma celebesianum Möllendorff, 1896
- Leptopoma concinnum (G. B. Sowerby I, 1841)
- Leptopoma condorianumCrosse & Fischer, 1863
- Leptopoma crenilabre Strubell, 1892
- † Leptopoma cretaceum Hrubesch, 1965
- Leptopoma cuticulare Möllendorff, 1888
- Leptopoma decipiens L. Pfeiffer, 1861
- Leptopoma diplochilus Sykes, 1903
- Leptopoma dohrni A. Adams & Angas, 1864
- Leptopoma dubium Kobelt, 1886
- Leptopoma duplicatum (L. Pfeiffer, 1857)
- Leptopoma elatum (L. Pfeiffer, 1852)
- Leptopoma euconus Möllendorff, 1894
- Leptopoma fibula (G. B. Sowerby I, 1843)
- Leptopoma fibulinum Quadras & Möllendorff, 1897
- Leptopoma freeri Bartsch, 1909
- Leptopoma fulgurans Dautzenberg, 1902
- Leptopoma fultoni Aldrich, 1898
- Leptopoma gebiense Fulton, 1904
- Leptopoma geotrochiforme E. A. Smith, 1895
- Leptopoma gianelli Tapparone Canefri, 1886
- Leptopoma globulosum L. Pfeiffer, 1861
- Leptopoma goniostoma (Reeve, 1842)
- Leptopoma halmahericum Strubell, 1892
- Leptopoma hanleyanum (L. Pfeiffer, 1856)
- Leptopoma hargravesi Cox, 1873
- Leptopoma helicoides (Grateloup, 1840)
- Leptopoma holosericum P. Sarasin & F. Sarasin, 1899
- Leptopoma huberi (Thach, 2018)
- Leptopoma ignescens (L. Pfeiffer, 1851)
- Leptopoma injectum Iredale, 1941
- Leptopoma insigne (G. B. Sowerby I, 1843)
- Leptopoma intermedium E. von Martens, 1867
- Leptopoma intuszonatum Hidalgo, 1888
- Leptopoma kuekenthali Kobelt, 1897
- Leptopoma lamellatum Sykes, 1903
- Leptopoma latelimbatum (L. Pfeiffer, 1851)
- Leptopoma latilabre E. von Martens, 1867
- Leptopoma leucorhaphe E. von Martens, 1863
- Leptopoma luteostoma (G. B. Sowerby I, 1843)
- Leptopoma maculatum (I. Lea, 1838)
- Leptopoma marginellus (Gmelin, 1791)
- Leptopoma massena (Lesson, 1831)
- Leptopoma mathildae Dohrn, 1862
- Leptopoma maubanense Kobelt, 1886
- Leptopoma mcgregori Bartsch, 1930
- Leptopoma megalostoma Möllendorff, 1902
- Leptopoma mekongiensis Rochebrune, 1882
- Leptopoma melanostoma (Petit, 1841)
  - Leptopoma melanostoma janetabbasae Thach, 2018
- Leptopoma menadense L. Pfeiffer, 1861
- Leptopoma minus Martens, 1867
- † Leptopoma minutum Hrubesch, 1965
- Leptopoma mitchellae E. A. Smith, 1900
- † Leptopoma morleti Cossmann, 1892
- Leptopoma mouhoti L. Pfeiffer, 1861
- Leptopoma moussoni E. von Martens, 1865
- Leptopoma moutonense Leschke, 1914
- Leptopoma natunense E. A. Smith, 1894
- Leptopoma niasense Fulton, 1907
- Leptopoma nigrilabrum Tapparone Canefri, 1886
- Leptopoma panayense (G. B. Sowerby I, 1843)
- Leptopoma papuanum Dohrn, 1862
- Leptopoma pellucidum (Hombron & Jacquinot, 1848)
- Leptopoma perlucidum (Grateloup, 1840)
- Leptopoma perplexum (G. B. Sowerby I, 1843)
- Leptopoma pfeifferi Dohrn, 1862
- Leptopoma pileolus Quadras & Möllendorff, 1895
- Leptopoma pileus (G. B. Sowerby I, 1843)
- Leptopoma poecilum Quadras & Möllendorff, 1895
- Leptopoma polillanum Möllendorff, 1894
- Leptopoma polyzonatum Möllendorff, 1882
- Leptopoma pulchellum Quadras & Möllendorff, 1894
- Leptopoma pulicarium L. Pfeiffer, 1861
- Leptopoma pumilum Tapparone Canefri, 1886
- Leptopoma puniceum Tapparone Canefri, 1886
- Leptopoma pusillum Möllendorff, 1890
- Leptopoma pyramis Kobelt, 1886
- Leptopoma quadrasi Möllendorff, 1893
- Leptopoma regulare (L. Pfeiffer, 1851)
- Leptopoma roepstorffianum G. Nevill, 1878
- Leptopoma roseum Möllendorff, 1888
- Leptopoma sarasinorum Kobelt, 1897
- Leptopoma scabrum Möllendorff, 1902
- Leptopoma scalare H. Adams, 1865
- Leptopoma sechellarum (L. Pfeiffer, 1855)
- Leptopoma semiclausum (L. Pfeiffer, 1855)
- Leptopoma sericatum (L. Pfeiffer, 1853)
- Leptopoma signatum (L. Pfeiffer, 1857)
- Leptopoma skertchlyi E. A. Smith, 1895
- Leptopoma sriabbasae Thach, 2020
- Leptopoma stainforthi (G.B. Sowerby II, 1842)
- Leptopoma subalatum Quadras & Möllendorff, 1893
- Leptopoma superbum Dohrn, 1889
- Leptopoma tagolandense Pilsbry, 1908
- Leptopoma tayninense Heude, 1890
- Leptopoma thachi F. Huber, 2020
- Leptopoma tigris Lee & Wu, 2001
- Leptopoma tissotianum (Crosse, 1878)
- Leptopoma trochus Dohrn, 1862
- Leptopoma undatum (Metcalfe, 1851)
- Leptopoma varians Möllendorff, 1895
- Leptopoma venustulum Tapparone Canefri, 1886
- Leptopoma vexillum P. Sarasin & F. Sarasin, 1899
- Leptopoma wallacei (L. Pfeiffer, 1857)
- Leptopoma whiteheadi E. A. Smith, 1887
- Leptopoma woodfordi G. B. Sowerby III, 1890

Species brought into synonymy

- Leptopoma nitidum (Sowerby, G.B. II, 1843) : synonym of Leptopoma perlucida (Grateloup, 1840) (junior synonym)
- Leptopoma vitreum (Lesson, 1826): synonym of Leptopoma perlucidum (Grateloup, 1840)
