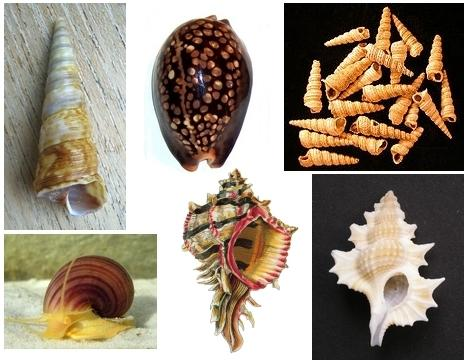
- Various examples of Apogastropoda

Scientific classification
- Kingdom: Animalia
- Phylum: Mollusca
- Class: Gastropoda
- Subclass: Orthogastropoda
- Infraclass: Apogastropoda; Salvini-Plawen & Haszprunar, 1987

Superorders
- Heterobranchia; Caenogastropoda

= Apogastropoda =

Group of molluscs

Apogastropoda is a clade of gastropods uniting the highly diverse Caenogastropoda and Heterobranchia. Most caenogastropods are sea snails, whereas heterobranchs include not only sea snails but most species of sea slug, land snail, and land slug.

== Taxonomy ==
Apogastropoda was coined by Salvini-Plawen and Hazprunar in 1987. In their original usage, it was intended as a paraphyletic grouping that contained caenogastropods and non-euthyneuran heterobranchs. In 1997, Ponder and Lindberg redefined the taxon to include Euthyneura, so that it would be monophyletic.

The monophyly of Apogastropoda is supported by both morphological and molecular data. Phylogenetic analyses based on the mitochondrial genome have historically found Apogastropoda to be non-monophyletic, but this is considered an artifact of long branch attraction and the reliability of the mitochondrial genome for resolving deep relationships in molluscs has been questioned. Early analyses of the mitogenome, which recovered Heterobranchia as the sister taxon of Patellogastropoda instead of Caenogastropoda, included data from only one patellogastropod taxon, Lottia digitalis, which has undergone a high rate of evolutionary change to its mitogenome that obscures its evolutionary relationships. Including mitochondrial genomes from more species of patellogastropod results in a monophyletic Apogastropoda being recovered, consistent with the results from other sources of data.

== Description ==
Apogastropods are generally characterized by a single pair of head tentacles, each of which contains a nerve that is deeply forked into two parallel branches. In euthyneurans, this condition is modified so that each nerve branch forms a separate tentacle.
