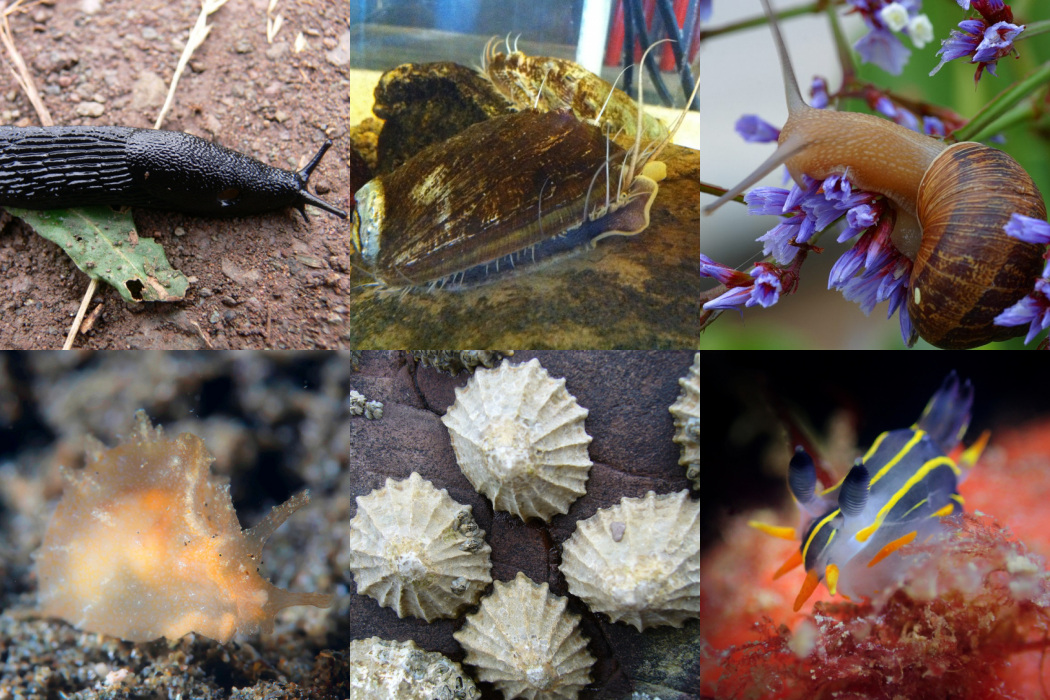
- Various gastropods from different types: black slug (a slug), Haliotis asinina (an abalone), Cornu aspersum (a land snail), Notarchus indicus (a seahare), Patella vulgata (a limpet), and Polycera aurantiomarginata (a nudibranch).

Scientific classification
- Kingdom: Animalia
- Phylum: Mollusca
- Class: Gastropoda; Cuvier, 1795

Subclasses
- †Amphigastropoda; Caenogastropoda; Heterobranchia; Neritimorpha; Patellogastropoda; Vetigastropoda

Diversity
- 65,000 to 80,000 species

Synonyms
- Angiogastropoda - represented as Gastropoda; Apogastropoda - alternate representation of Gastropoda; Psilogastropoda - represented as Gastropoda

= Gastropod =

Gastropod Temporal range: Late Cambrian–Present

Class of molluscs

Gastropods (/ˈɡæstrəpɒdz/; previously known as Univalves; class Gastropoda /ɡæsˈtrɒpədə/) are a vast and diverse group of invertebrates within the phylum Mollusca, comprising the animals commonly known as snails and slugs. With an estimated 65,000 to 80,000 living species, they form the second-largest animal class after the insects. The fossil record of gastropods extends back to the Late Cambrian. As of 2017, 721 families are recognized—476 extant (some with fossil representatives) and 245 extinct known only from fossils.

Gastropods inhabit an extraordinary range of environments, including marine, freshwater, and terrestrial ecosystems. They occur in gardens, woodlands, deserts, mountains, rivers, lakes, estuaries, mudflats, intertidal zones, the deep sea, hydrothermal vents, and even in parasitic niches.

The term snail generally refers to gastropods with a large external shell into which the body can fully retract, while slugs have no shell or a small internal one, and semislugs can only partially withdraw into their reduced shell. Marine gastropods include familiar forms such as abalones, conches, periwinkles, whelks, and cowries, whose shells are usually coiled in adulthood. In contrast, limpets and related groups coil their shells only in the larval stage, retaining a simple conical form as adults.

Because of their vast diversity, gastropods exhibit remarkable variation in anatomy, behavior, feeding, and reproduction, making broad generalizations difficult. Gastropods remain one of evolution's most successful and adaptable animal lineages.

== Etymology ==
In the scientific literature, gastropods were described as "gasteropodes" by Georges Cuvier in 1795. The word gastropod comes from Greek γαστήρ (gastḗr 'stomach') and πούς (poús 'foot'), a reference to the fact that the animal's "foot" is positioned below its guts.

The earlier name "univalve" means one valve (or shell), in contrast to bivalves, such as clams, which have two valves or shells.

== Diversity ==
At all taxonomic levels, gastropods are second only to insects in terms of their diversity.

Gastropods have the greatest numbers of named mollusk species. However, estimates of the total number of gastropod species vary widely, depending on cited sources. The number of gastropod species can be ascertained from estimates of the number of described species of Mollusca with accepted names: about 85,000 (minimum 50,000, maximum 120,000). But an estimate of the total number of Mollusca, including undescribed species, is about 240,000 species. The estimate of 85,000 mollusks includes 24,000 described species of terrestrial gastropods.

Different estimates for aquatic gastropods (based on different sources) give about 30,000 species of marine gastropods, and about 5,000 species of freshwater and brackish gastropods. Many deep-sea species remain to be discovered, as only 0.0001% of the deep-sea floor has been studied biologically. The total number of living species of freshwater snails is about 4,000.

Recently extinct species of gastropods (extinct since 1500) number 444, 18 species are now extinct in the wild (but still exist in captivity), and 69 species are "possibly extinct".

The number of prehistoric (fossil) species of gastropods is at least 15,000 species.

In marine habitats, the continental slope and the continental rise are home to the highest diversity, while the continental shelf and abyssal depths have a low diversity of marine gastropods.

== Habitat ==
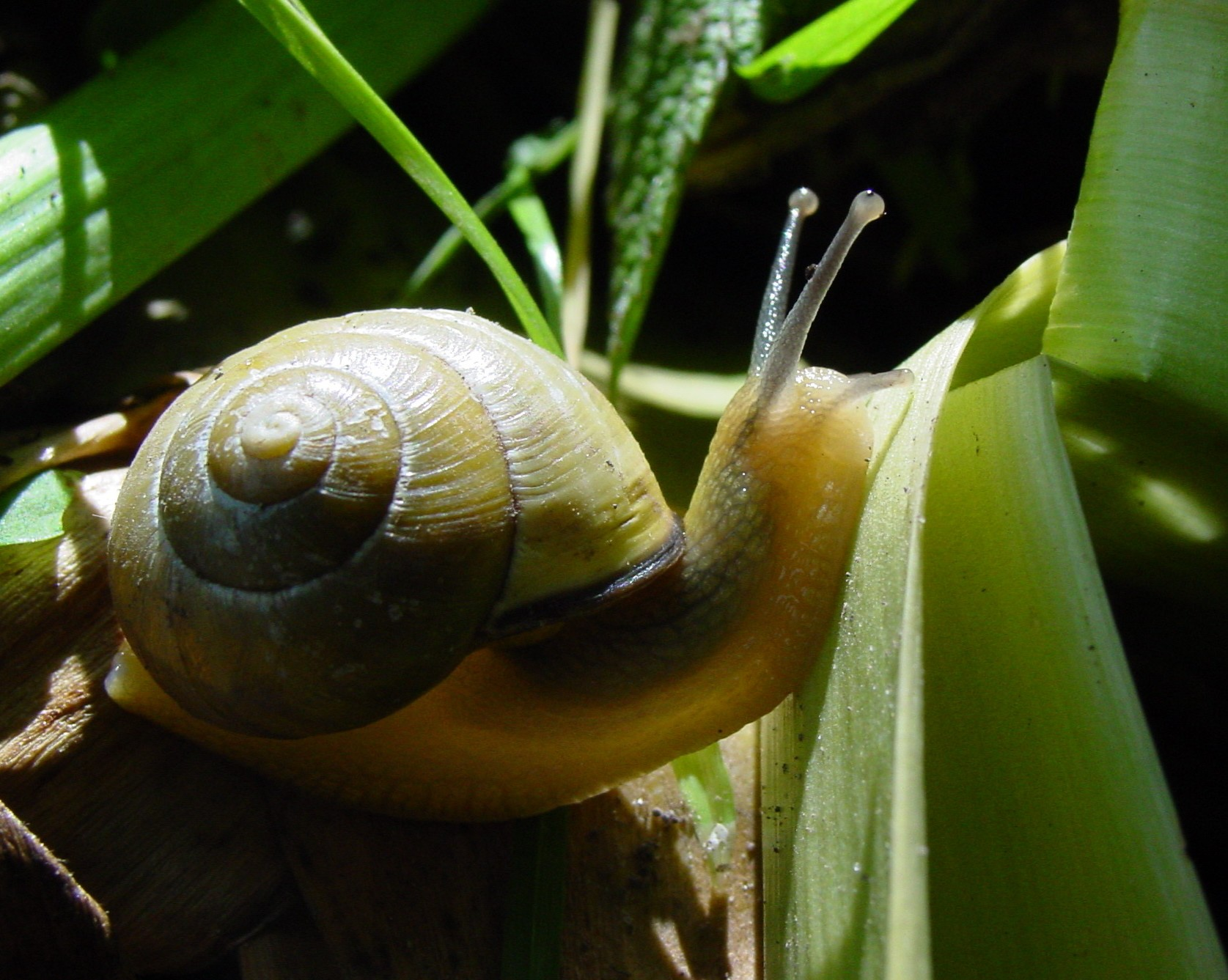
Cepaea nemoralis: a European pulmonate land snail, which has been introduced to many other countries

Gastropods are found in a wide range of aquatic and terrestrial habitats, from deep ocean trenches to deserts.

Some of the more familiar and better-known gastropods are terrestrial gastropods (the land snails and slugs). Some live in fresh water, but most named species of gastropods live in a marine environment.

Gastropods have a worldwide distribution, from the near Arctic and Antarctic zones to the tropics. They have become adapted to almost every kind of existence on earth, having colonized nearly every available medium.

In habitats where not enough calcium carbonate is available to build a really solid shell, such as on some acidic soils on land, various species of slugs occur, and also some snails with thin, translucent shells, mostly or entirely composed of the protein conchiolin.

Snails such as Sphincterochila boissieri and Xerocrassa seetzeni have adapted to desert conditions. Other snails have adapted to an existence in ditches, near deepwater hydrothermal vents, in oceanic trenches 10,000 meters (6 miles) below the surface, the pounding surf of rocky shores, caves, and many other diverse areas.

Gastropods can be accidentally transferred from one habitat to another by other animals, e.g. by birds.

== Anatomy ==
The anatomy of a common air-breathing land snail: much of this anatomy does not apply to gastropods in other clades or groups.

Snails are distinguished by an anatomical process known as torsion, where the visceral mass of the animal rotates 180° to one side during development, such that the anus is situated more or less above the head. This process is unrelated to the coiling of the shell, which is a separate phenomenon. Torsion is present in all gastropods, but the opisthobranch gastropods are secondarily untorted to various degrees.

Torsion occurs in two stages. The first, mechanistic stage is muscular, and the second is mutagenetic. The effects of torsion are primarily physiological. The organism develops by asymmetrical growth, with the majority of growth occurring on the left side. This leads to the loss of right-side anatomy that in most bilaterians is a duplicate of the left side anatomy. The essential feature of this asymmetry is that the anus generally lies to one side of the median plane. The gill-combs, the olfactory organs, the foot slime-gland, nephridia, and the auricle of the heart are single or at least are more developed on one side of the body than the other. Furthermore, there is only one genital orifice, which lies on the same side of the body as the anus. Furthermore, the anus becomes redirected to the same space as the head. This is speculated to have some evolutionary function, as prior to torsion, when retracting into the shell, first the posterior end would get pulled in, and then the anterior. Now, the front can be retracted more easily, perhaps suggesting a defensive purpose.

Gastropods typically have a well-defined head with two or four sensory tentacles with eyes, and a ventral foot. The foremost division of the foot is called the propodium. Its function is to push away sediment as the snail crawls. The larval shell of a gastropod is called a protoconch.

=== Shell ===
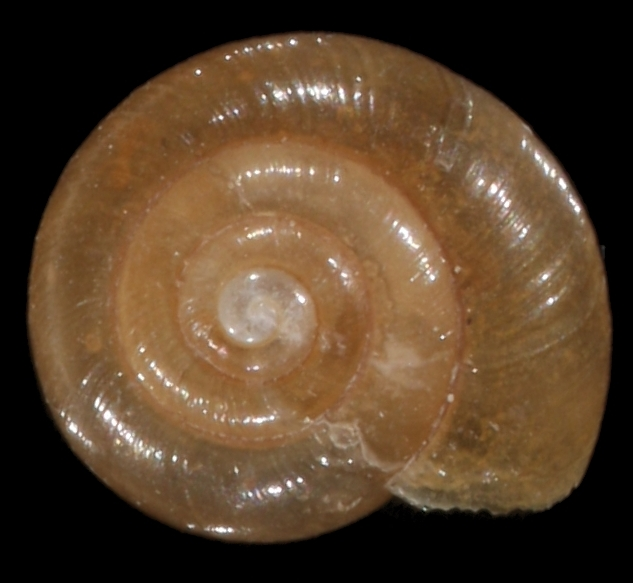
The shell of Zonitoides nitidus, a small land snail, has dextral coiling, which is typical (but not universal) of gastropod shells.

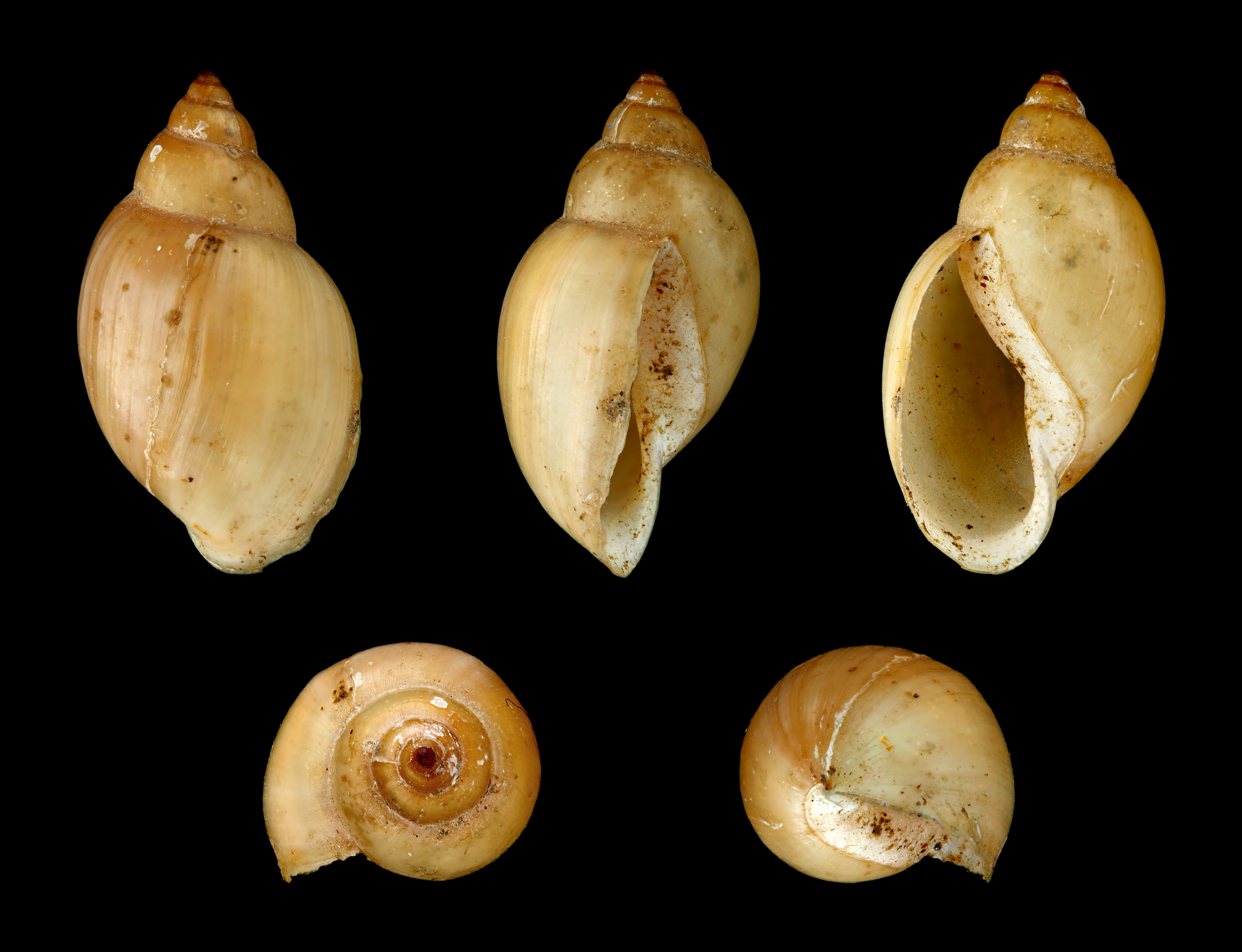
The shell of Physella acuta, a freshwater snail, which is left-coiling (sinistral).

Most shelled gastropods have a one piece shell (with exceptional bivalved gastropods), typically coiled or spiraled, at least in the larval stage. This coiled shell usually opens on the right-hand side (as viewed with the shell apex pointing upward). Numerous species have an operculum, which in many species acts as a trapdoor to close the shell. This is usually made of a horn-like material, but in some molluscs it is calcareous. In the land slugs, the shell is reduced or absent, and the body is streamlined.

Some gastropods have adult shells which are bottom heavy due to the presence of a thick, often broad, convex ventral callus deposit on the inner lip and adapical to the aperture which may be important for gravitational stability.

=== Chirality ===
Most snail species possess a dextral (right-coiled) shell, which mirrors their internal anatomy. However, sinistral (left-coiled) shells are the obligate and standard form in several large families and genera (such as Physidae and most Clausiliidae), where the internal anatomy is symmetrically reversed.

=== Body wall ===
Some sea slugs are very brightly colored. This serves either as a warning, when they are poisonous or contain stinging cells, or to camouflage them on the brightly colored hydroids, sponges, and seaweeds on which many of the species are found.

Lateral outgrowths on the body of nudibranchs are called cerata. These contain an outpocketing of digestive glands called the diverticula.

=== Sensory organs and nervous system ===
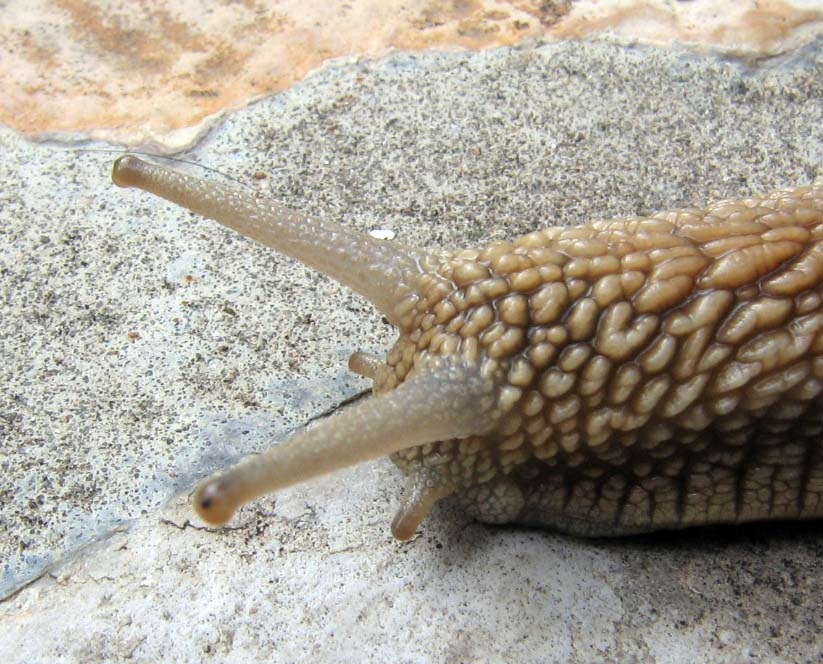
The upper pair of tentacles on the head of Helix pomatia have eye spots, but the main sensory organs of the snail are sensory receptors for olfaction, situated in the epithelium of the tentacles.

The sensory organs of gastropods include olfactory organs, eyes, statocysts and mechanoreceptors. Gastropods have no hearing.

In terrestrial gastropods (land snails and slugs), the olfactory organs, located on the tips of the four tentacles, are the most important sensory organ. The chemosensory organs of opisthobranch marine gastropods are called rhinophores.

The majority of gastropods have simple visual organs, eye spots either at the tip or base of the tentacles. However, "eyes" in gastropods range from simple ocelli that only distinguish light and dark, to more complex pit eyes, and even to lens eyes. In land snails and slugs, vision is not the most important sense, because they are mainly nocturnal animals.

The nervous system of gastropods includes the peripheral nervous system and the central nervous system. The central nervous system consists of ganglia connected by nerve cells. It includes paired ganglia: the cerebral ganglia, pedal ganglia, osphradial ganglia, pleural ganglia, parietal ganglia and the visceral ganglia. There are sometimes also buccal ganglia.

=== Digestive system ===
The radula of a gastropod is usually adapted to the food that a species eats. The simplest gastropods are the limpets and abalone, herbivores that use their hard radula to rasp at seaweeds on rocks.

Many marine gastropods are burrowers, and have a siphon that extends out from the mantle edge. Sometimes the shell has a siphonal canal to accommodate this structure. A siphon enables the animal to draw water into their mantle cavity and over the gill. They use the siphon primarily to "taste" the water to detect prey from a distance. Gastropods with siphons tend to be either predators or scavengers.

=== Respiratory system ===
Almost all marine gastropods breathe with a gill, but many freshwater species, and the majority of terrestrial species, have a pallial lung. The respiratory protein in almost all gastropods is hemocyanin, but one freshwater pulmonate family, the Planorbidae, have hemoglobin as the respiratory protein.

In one large group of sea slugs, the gills are arranged as a rosette of feathery plumes on their backs, which gives rise to their other name, nudibranchs. Some nudibranchs have smooth or warty backs with no visible gill mechanism, such that respiration may likely take place directly through the skin.

=== Circulatory system ===
Gastropods have open circulatory system and the transport fluid is hemolymph. Hemocyanin is present in the hemolymph as the respiratory pigment.

=== Excretory system ===
The primary organs of excretion in gastropods are nephridia, which produce either ammonia or uric acid as a waste product. The nephridium also plays an important role in maintaining water balance in freshwater and terrestrial species. Additional organs of excretion, at least in some species, include pericardial glands in the body cavity, and digestive glands opening into the stomach.

=== Reproductive system ===
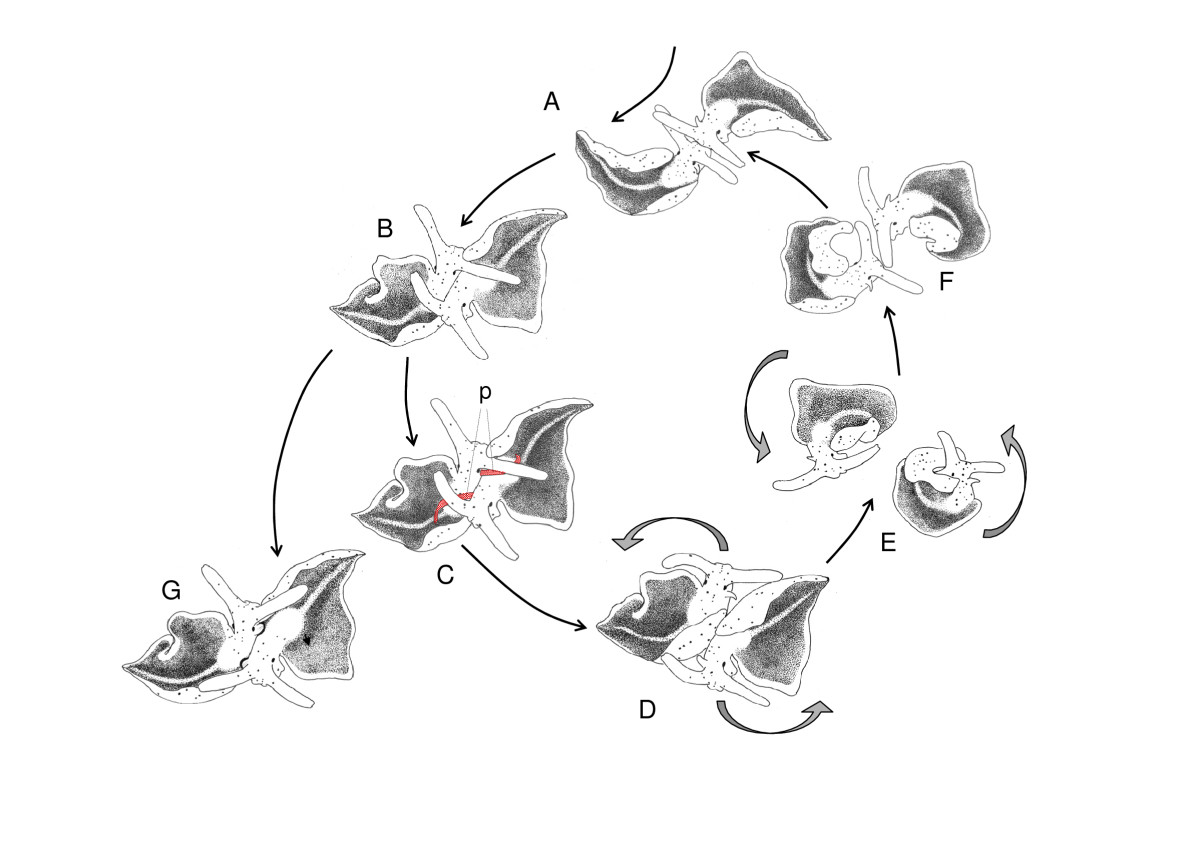
Mating behaviour of Elysia timida

Courtship is a part of mating behavior in some gastropods, including some of the Helicidae. Again, in some land snails, an unusual feature of the reproductive system of gastropods is the presence and utilization of love darts.

In many marine gastropods other than the opisthobranchs, there are separate sexes (dioecious/gonochoric); most land gastropods, however, are hermaphrodites.

== Life cycle ==
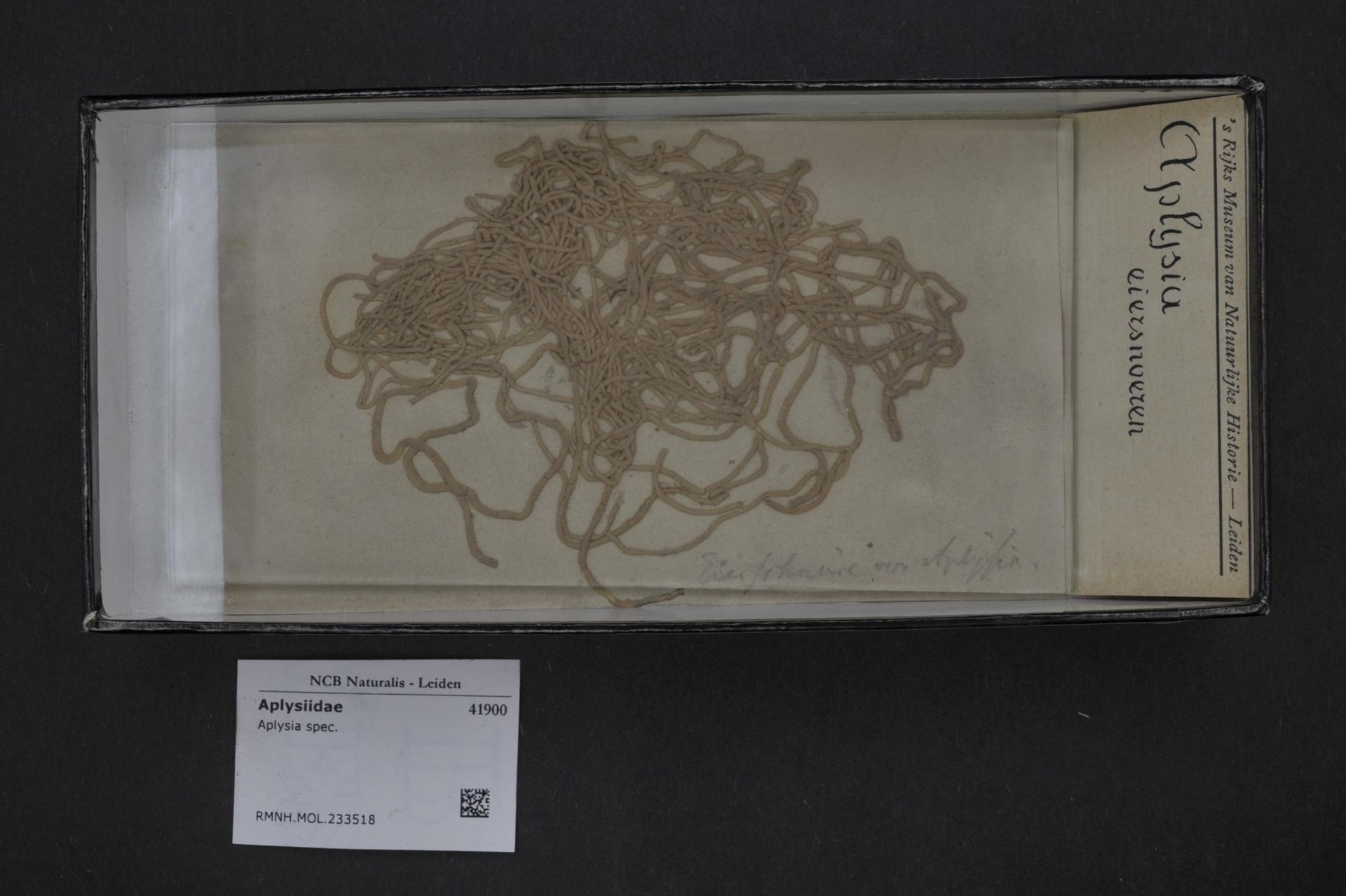
Egg strings of an Aplysia species.

Courtship is a part of the behavior of mating gastropods with some pulmonate families of land snails creating and utilizing love darts, the throwing of which have been identified as a form of sexual selection.

The main aspects of the life cycle of gastropods include:

- Egg laying and the eggs of gastropods
- The embryonic development of gastropods
- The larvae or larval stadium: some gastropods may be trochophore and/or veliger
- Estivation and hibernation (each of these are present in some gastropods only)
- The growth of gastropods
- Courtship and mating in gastropods: fertilization is internal or external according to the species. External fertilization is common in marine gastropods.

== Feeding behavior ==
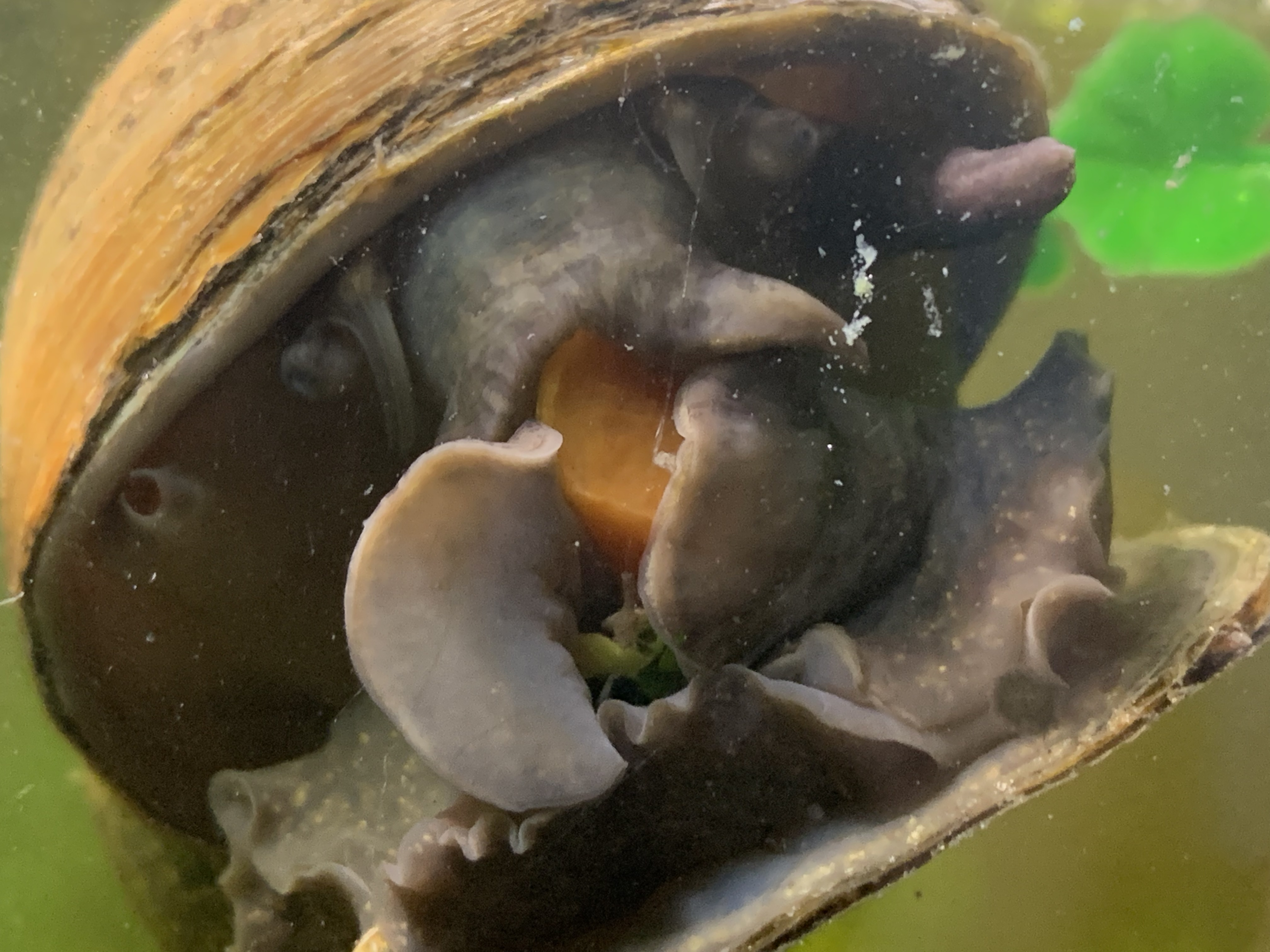
An apple snail, Pomacea maculata, floating and eating a piece of carrot

The diet of gastropods differs according to the group considered. Marine gastropods include some that are herbivores, detritus feeders, predatory carnivores, scavengers, parasites, and also a few ciliary feeders, in which the radula is reduced or absent. Land-dwelling species can chew up leaves, bark, fruit, fungi, and decomposing animals while marine species can scrape algae off the rocks on the seafloor. Certain species such as the Archaeogastropoda maintain horizontal rows of slender marginal teeth. In some species that have evolved into endoparasites, such as the eulimid Thyonicola doglieli, many of the standard gastropod features are strongly reduced or absent.

A few sea slugs are herbivores and some are carnivores. The carnivorous habit is due to specialisation. Many gastropods have distinct dietary preferences and regularly occur in close association with their food species.

Some predatory carnivorous gastropods include: cone shells, Testacella, Daudebardia, turrids, ghost slugs and others.

=== Terrestrial gastropods ===
Studies based on direct observations, fecal and gut analyses, as well as food-choice experiments, have revealed that snails and slugs consume a wide variety of food resources. Their diet spans from living plants at various developmental stages such as pollen, seeds, seedlings, and wood, to decaying plant material like leaf litter. Additionally, they feed on fungi, lichens, algae, soil, and even other animals, both living and dead, including their feces. Given this diverse diet, terrestrial gastropods can be classified as herbivores, omnivores, carnivores, and detritivores. However, the majority are microbivores, primarily consuming microbes associated with decaying organic material. Despite their ecological importance, there is a notable lack of research exploring the specific roles that terrestrial gastropods play within soil food webs.

==== Fungivory ====
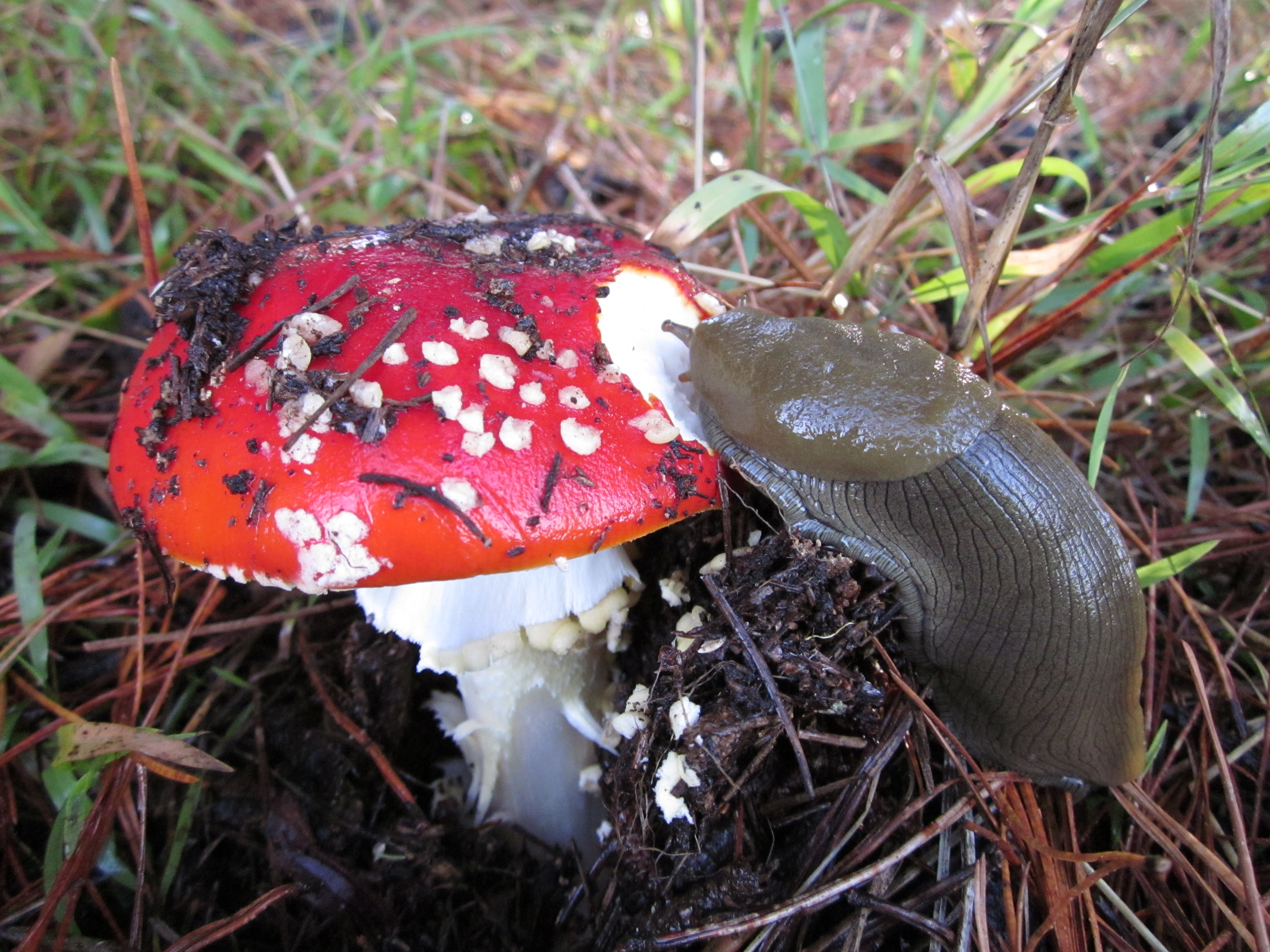
A banana slug, Ariolimax, feeding on an Amanita mushroom

Many terrestrial gastropod mollusks are known to consume fungi, a behavior observed in various species of snails and slugs across distinct families. Notable examples of fungivore slugs include members of the family Philomycidae, which feed on slime molds (myxomycetes), and the Ariolimacidae, which primarily consume mushrooms (basidiomycetes). Snail families that contain fungivore species include Clausiliidae, Macrocyclidae, and Polygyridae.

Mushroom-producing fungi used as a food source by snails and slugs include species from several genera. Some examples are milk-caps (Lactarius spp.), the oyster mushroom (Pleurotus ostreatus), and the penny bun. Additionally, slugs feed on fungi from other genera, such as Agaricus, Pleurocybella, and Russula. Snails have also been reported to feed on penny buns as well as Coprinellus, Aleurodiscus, Armillaria, Grifola , Marasmiellus, Mycena, Pholiota, and Ramaria. As for slime molds, commonly consumed species include Stemonitis axifera and Symphytocarpus flaccidus.

Feeding behaviors in slugs exhibit considerable variation. Some species display selectivity, consuming specific parts or developmental stages of fungi. For instance, certain slugs may target fungi only at particular stages of maturity, such as immature fruiting bodies or spore-producing structures. Conversely, other species show little to no selectivity, consuming entire mushrooms regardless of developmental stage. This variability stresses the diverse dietary adaptations among slug species and their ecological roles in fungal consumption. Moreover, by consuming fungi, snails and slugs can also indirectly help in their dispersal by carrying along some of their spores or the fungi themselves.

== Genetics ==
Gastropods exhibit an important degree of variation in mitochondrial gene organization when compared to other animals. Main events of gene rearrangement occurred at the origin of Patellogastropoda and Heterobranchia, whereas fewer changes occurred between the ancestors of Vetigastropoda (only tRNAs D, C and N) and Caenogastropoda (a large single inversion, and translocations of the tRNAs D and N). Within Heterobranchia, gene order seems relatively conserved, and gene rearrangements are mostly related with transposition of tRNA genes.

== Geological history and evolution ==
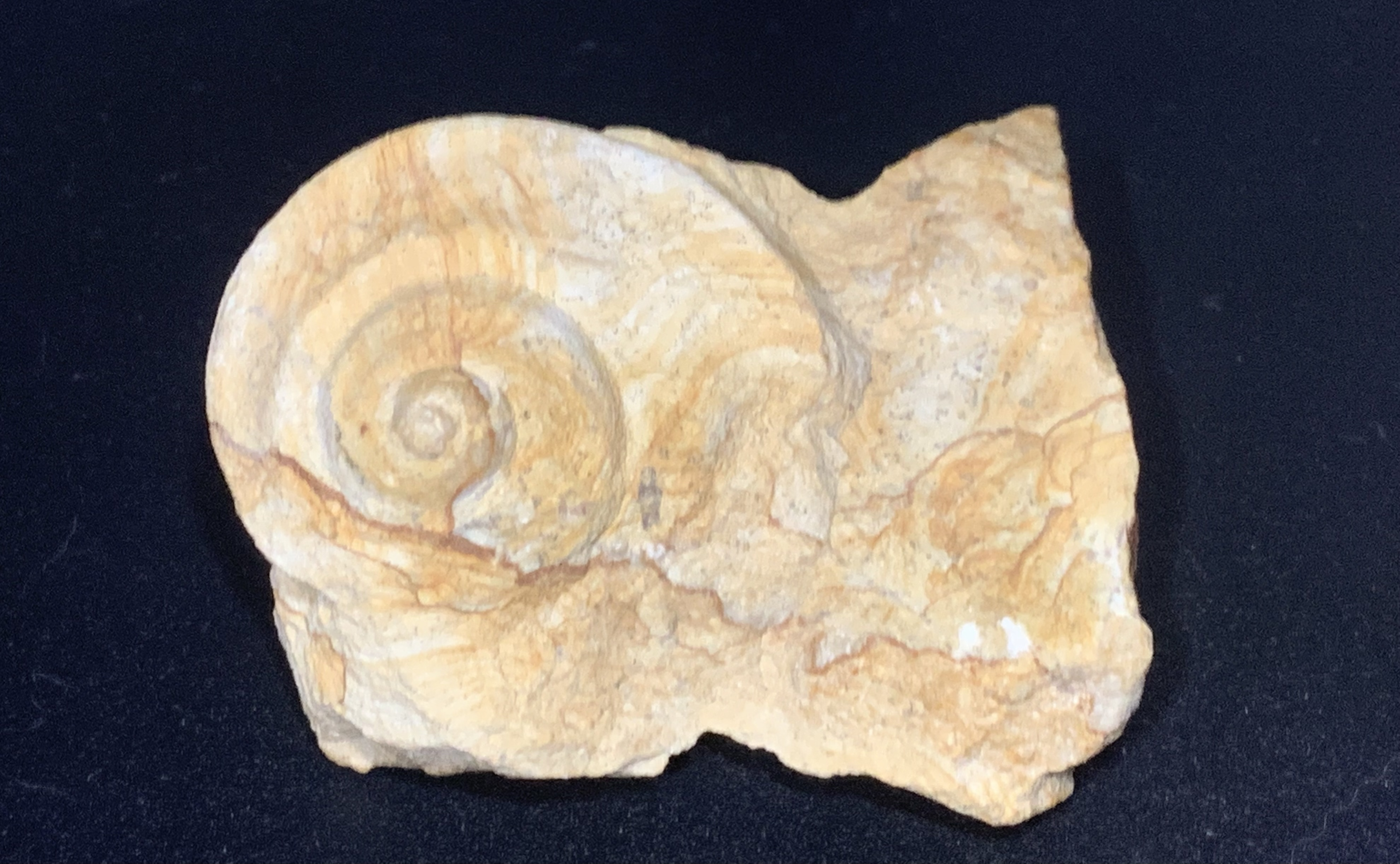
Trochonema sp., an early gastropod from the Middle Ordovician of the Galena Group of Minnesota.

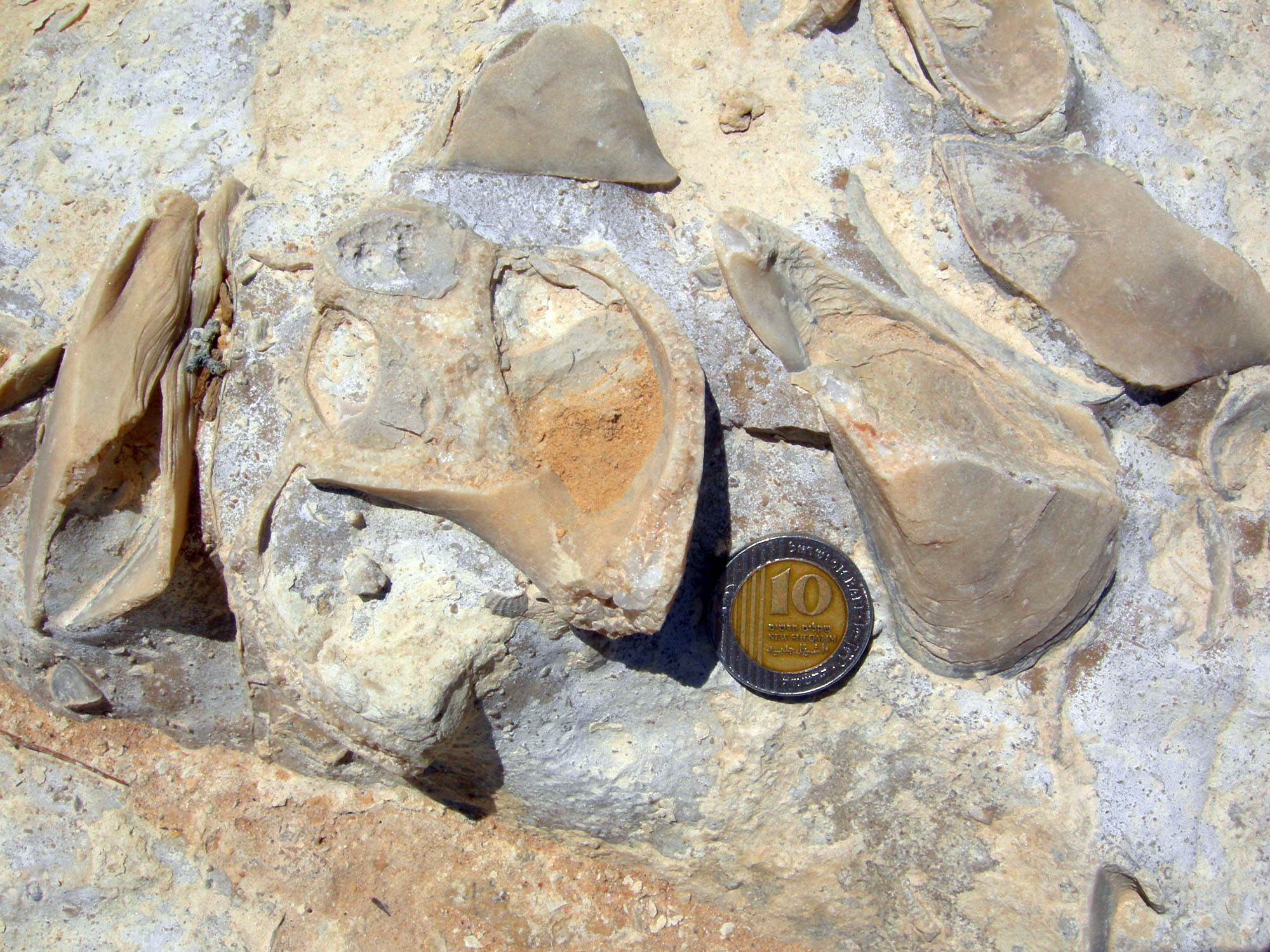
Fossil gastropod and attached mytilid bivalves on a Jurassic limestone bedding plane of the Matmor Formation in southern Israel.

The first gastropods were exclusively marine, with the earliest known representatives appearing in the Late Cambrian (e.g., Chippewaella, Strepsodiscus). However, their only definitive gastropod feature is a coiled shell, which raises the possibility that they may belong to the stem lineage of gastropods, or might not be gastropods at all. Early Cambrian species such as Helcionella, Barskovia, and Scenella are no longer considered gastropods, and the small coiled Aldanella from the same period is probably not even a mollusk.

It is not until the Ordovician that true crown-group gastropods appear. By this time, gastropods had diversified into a variety of forms and inhabited a range of aquatic environments. Fossil gastropods from the early Paleozoic are often poorly preserved, making identification difficult. However, the Silurian genus Poleumita contains at least 15 identified species. Overall, gastropods were less common in the Paleozoic than bivalves.

Most Paleozoic gastropods belong to primitive groups, some of which still exist today. By the Carboniferous period, many gastropod shell shapes found in fossils resemble those of modern species, though most of these early forms are not directly related to living gastropods. It was during the Mesozoic era that the ancestors of many extant gastropods evolved. One of the earliest known terrestrial gastropods is Anthracopupa (or Maturipupa), found in the Carboniferous Coal Measures of Europe. However, land snails and their relatives were rare before the Cretaceous period.

In Mesozoic rocks, gastropods become more common in the fossil record, with well-preserved shells. Fossils are found in ancient beds from both freshwater and marine environments. Notable examples include the Purbeck Marble of the Jurassic and the Sussex Marble of the early Cretaceous, both from southern England. These limestones contain abundant remains of the pond snail Viviparus. Cenozoic rocks yield vast numbers of gastropod fossils, many of which are closely related to modern species. The diversity of gastropods increased significantly at the start of this era, alongside that of bivalves.

Certain trail-like markings preserved in ancient sedimentary rocks are thought to have been made by gastropods crawling over the soft mud and sand. Although these trace fossils are of debatable origin, some of them do resemble the trails made by living gastropods today.

Gastropod fossils may sometimes be confused with ammonites or other shelled cephalopods. An example of this is Bellerophon from the limestones of the Carboniferous period in Europe, the shell of which is planispirally coiled and can be mistaken for the shell of a cephalopod.

Gastropods also provide important evidence of faunal changes during the Pleistocene epoch, reflecting the impacts of advancing and retreating ice sheets.

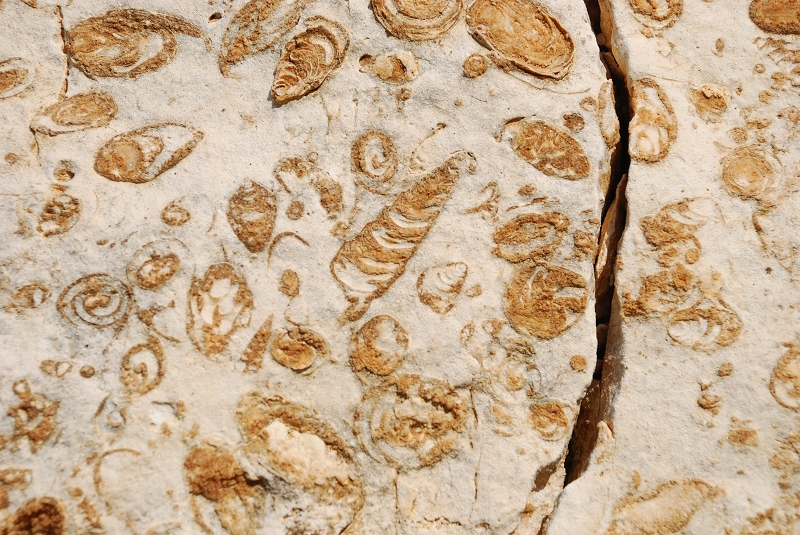
Cretaceous_Gastropod_Fossils_Lebanon

=== Phylogeny ===
A cladogram showing the phylogenic relationships of Gastropoda with example species:

- Gastropoda
  - - - - - - Panpulmonata ►
            - Euopisthobranchia ►
          - Nudipleura ►
        - Caenogastropoda
      - Neritimorpha
    - Vetigastropoda
  - Patellogastropoda ►

Neomphaliones and Lower Heterobranchia are not included in the above cladogram.

== Taxonomy ==
=== Current classification ===
The present backbone classification of gastropods relies on the results of phylogenomic analyses. Consensus has not been reached yet considering the relationships at the very base of the gastropod tree of life, but otherwise the major groups are known with confidence.

- Subclass Amphigastropoda †
- Subclass Apogastropoda
- Subclass Caenogastropoda
- Subclass Heterobranchia
- Subclass Neritimorpha
- Subclass Patellogastropoda
- Subclass Vetigastropoda (including Neomphaliones)

Subclass Gastropoda incertae sedis (temporary name)

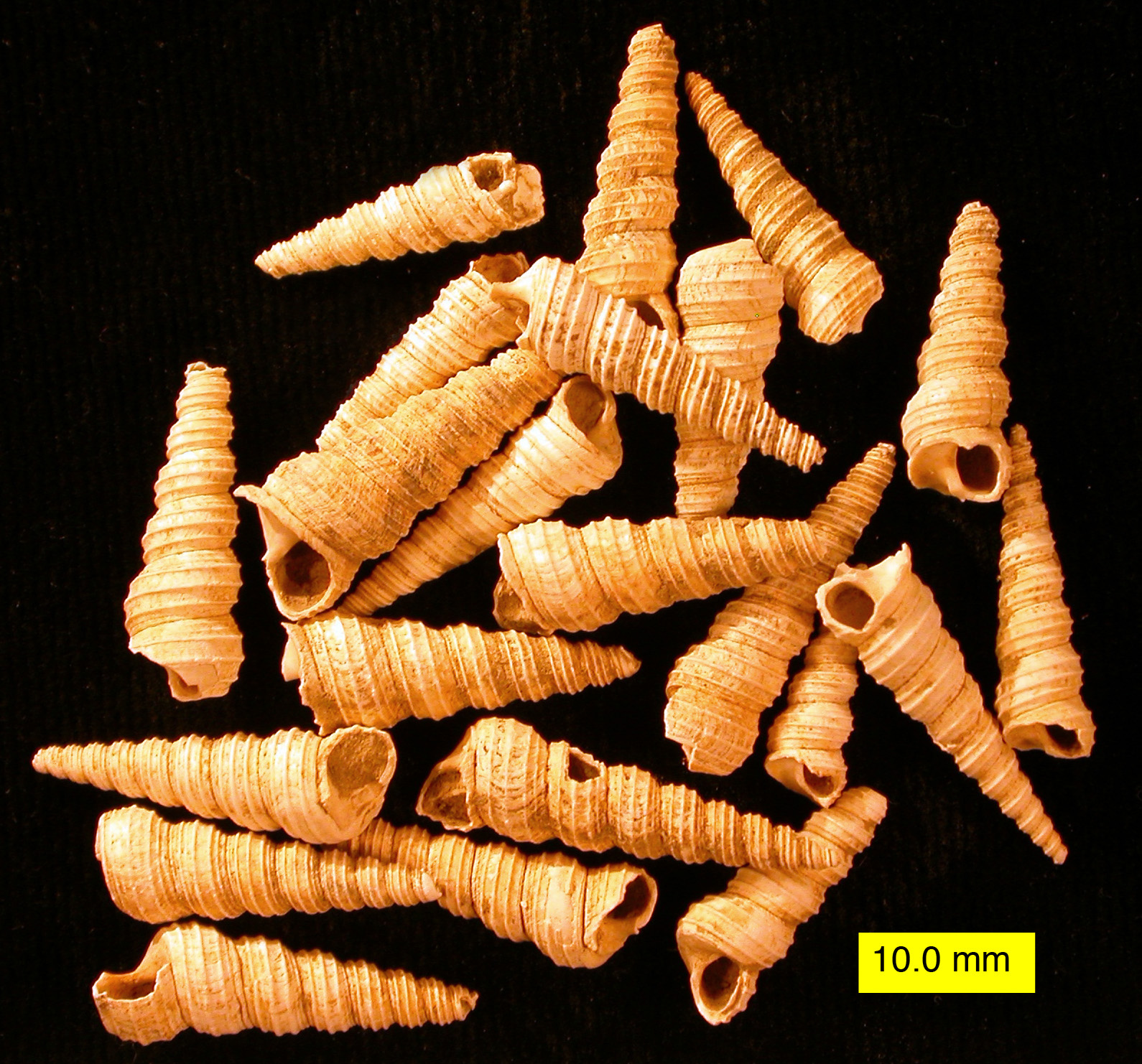
A group of fossil shells of Turritella cingulifera from the Pliocene of Cyprus

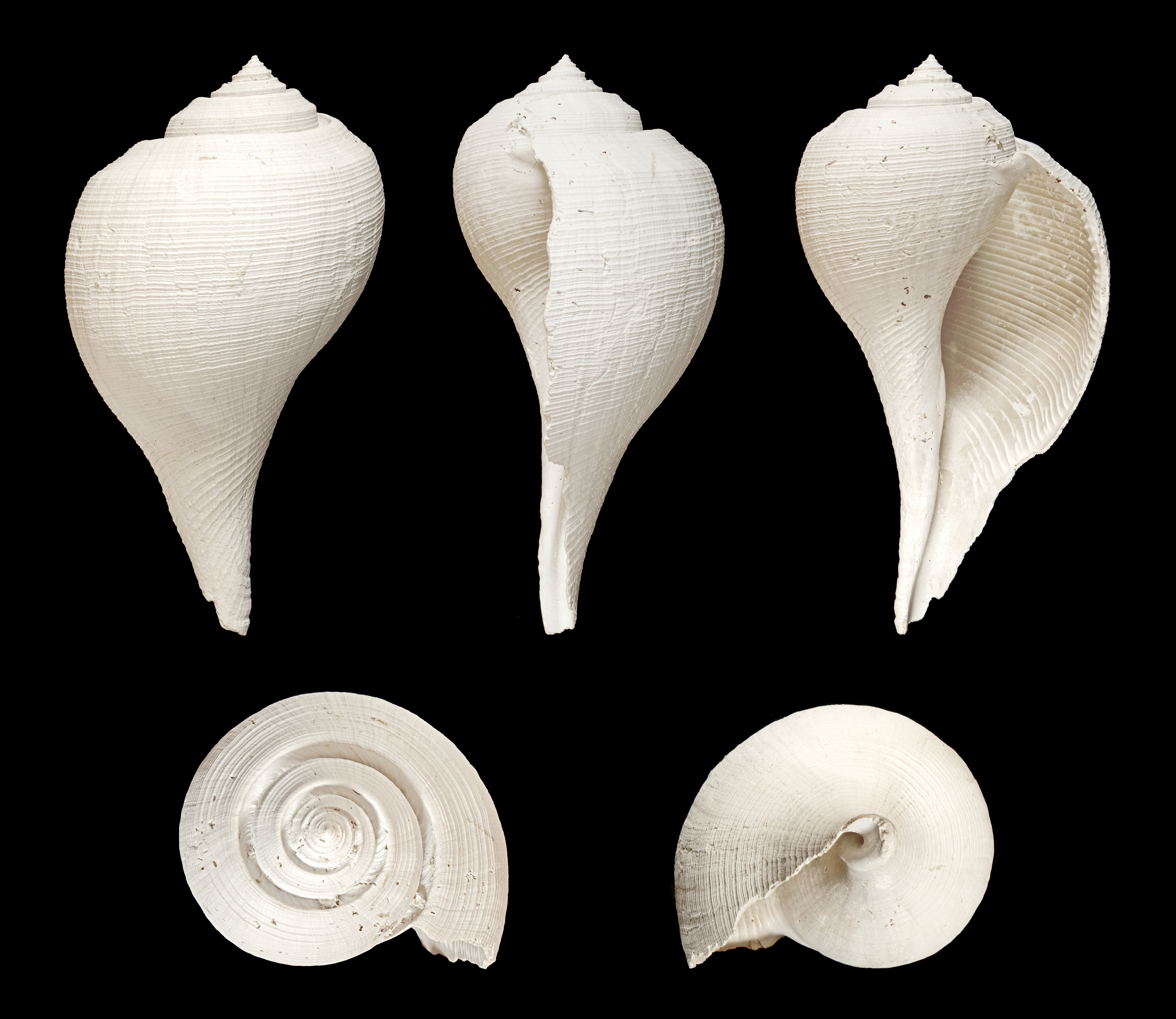
Five views of a shell of a Fulguropsis species

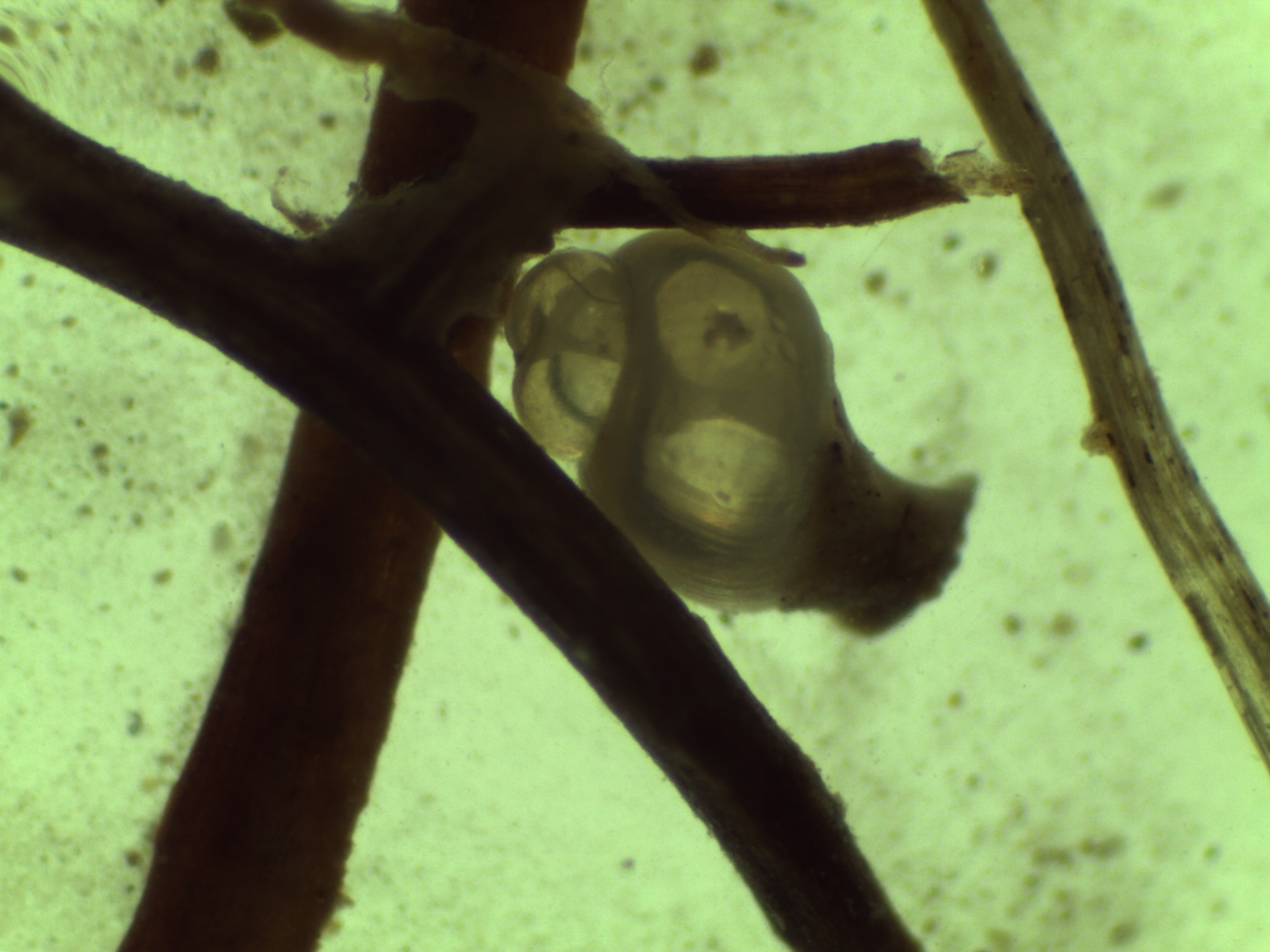
Microphoto (35x) of Gastropoda sp. from Holocene sediments of Amuq Plain SSE Turkey

=== History ===
Since Darwin, biological taxonomy has attempted to reflect the phylogeny of organisms, i.e., the tree of life. The classifications used in taxonomy attempt to represent the precise interrelatedness of the various taxa. However, the taxonomy of the Gastropoda is constantly being revised and so the versions shown in various texts can differ in major ways.

In the older classification of the gastropods, there were four subclasses:

- Opisthobranchia (gills to the right and behind the heart).
- Gymnomorpha (no shell)
- Prosobranchia (gills in front of the heart).
- Pulmonata (with a lung instead of gills)

The taxonomy of the Gastropoda is still under revision, and more and more of the old taxonomy is being abandoned, as the results of DNA studies slowly become clearer. Nevertheless, a few of the older terms such as "opisthobranch" and "prosobranch" are still sometimes used in a descriptive way.

New insights based on DNA sequencing of gastropods have produced some revolutionary new taxonomic insights. In the case of the Gastropoda, the taxonomy is now gradually being rewritten to embody strictly monophyletic groups (only one lineage of gastropods in each group). Integrating new findings into a working taxonomy remain challenging. Consistent ranks within the taxonomy at the level of subclass, superorder, order, and suborder have already been abandoned as unworkable. Ongoing revisions of the higher taxonomic levels are expected in the near future.

Convergent evolution, which appears to exist at especially high frequency in gastropods, may account for the observed differences between the older phylogenies, which were based on morphological data, and more recent gene-sequencing studies.

In 2004, Brian Simison and David R. Lindberg showed possible diphyletic origins of the Gastropoda based on mitochondrial gene order and amino acid sequence analyses of complete genes.

In 2005, Philippe Bouchet and Jean-Pierre Rocroi made sweeping changes in the systematics, resulting in the Bouchet & Rocroi taxonomy, which is a step closer to the evolutionary history of the phylum. The Bouchet & Rocroi classification system is based partly on the older systems of classification, and partly on new cladistic research. In the past, the taxonomy of gastropods was largely based on phenetic morphological characters of the taxa. The recent advances are more based on molecular characters from DNA and RNA research. This has made the taxonomical ranks and their hierarchy controversial.

In 2017, Bouchet, Rocroi, and other collaborators published a significantly updated version of the 2005 taxonomy. In the Bouchet et al. taxonomy, the authors used unranked clades for taxa above the rank of superfamily (replacing the ranks suborder, order, superorder and subclass), while using the traditional Linnaean approach for all taxa below the rank of superfamily. Whenever monophyly has not been tested, or is known to be paraphyletic or polyphyletic, the term "group" or "informal group" has been used. The classification of families into subfamilies is often not well resolved.

Fixed ranks like family, genus, and species however remain useful for practical classification and remain used in the World Register of Marine Species (WoRMS). Also many researchers continue to use traditional ranks because they are entrenched in the literature and familiar to specialists and non-specialists alike.

== Ecology and conservation ==
Many gastropod species face threats from habitat destruction, pollution, and climate change. Some species are endangered or have become extinct due to these factors. Conservation efforts often focus on protecting their habitats, especially in freshwater and terrestrial ecosystems.

=== Predators ===
Gastropods are prey to a wide range of organisms depending on the environment. In marine habitats, gastropods are preyed upon by fish, marine birds, marine mammals, crustaceans, and other mollusks such as cephalopods. In terrestrial environments, gastropod predators include insects, arachnids (spiders, harvestmen), birds, and mammals, among others.

== Sources ==
- This article incorporates CC-BY-2.0 text from the following source: Cunha, R. L.; Grande, C.; Zardoya, R. (2009). "Neogastropod phylogenetic relationships based on entire mitochondrial genomes". BMC Evolutionary Biology. 9: 210. doi:10.1186/1471-2148-9-210. PMC 2741453. PMID 19698157.
- Abbott, R. T. (1989): Compendium of Landshells. A color guide to more than 2,000 of the World's Terrestrial Shells. 240 S., American Malacologists. Melbourne, Fl, Burlington, Ma. ISBN 0-915826-23-2
- Abbott, R. T. & Dance, S. P. (1998): Compendium of Seashells. A full-color guide to more than 4,200 of the world's marine shells. 413 S., Odyssey Publishing. El Cajon, Calif. ISBN 0-9661720-0-0
- Parkinson, B., Hemmen, J. & Groh, K. (1987): Tropical Landshells of the World. 279 S., Verlag Christa Hemmen. Wiesbaden. ISBN 3-925919-00-7
- Ponder, W. F. & Lindberg, D. R. (1997): Towards a phylogeny of gastropod molluscs: an analysis using morphological characters. Zoological Journal of the Linnean Society, 119 83–265.
- Robin, A. (2008): Encyclopedia of Marine Gastropods. 480 S., Verlag ConchBooks. Hackenheim. ISBN 978-3-939767-09-1
