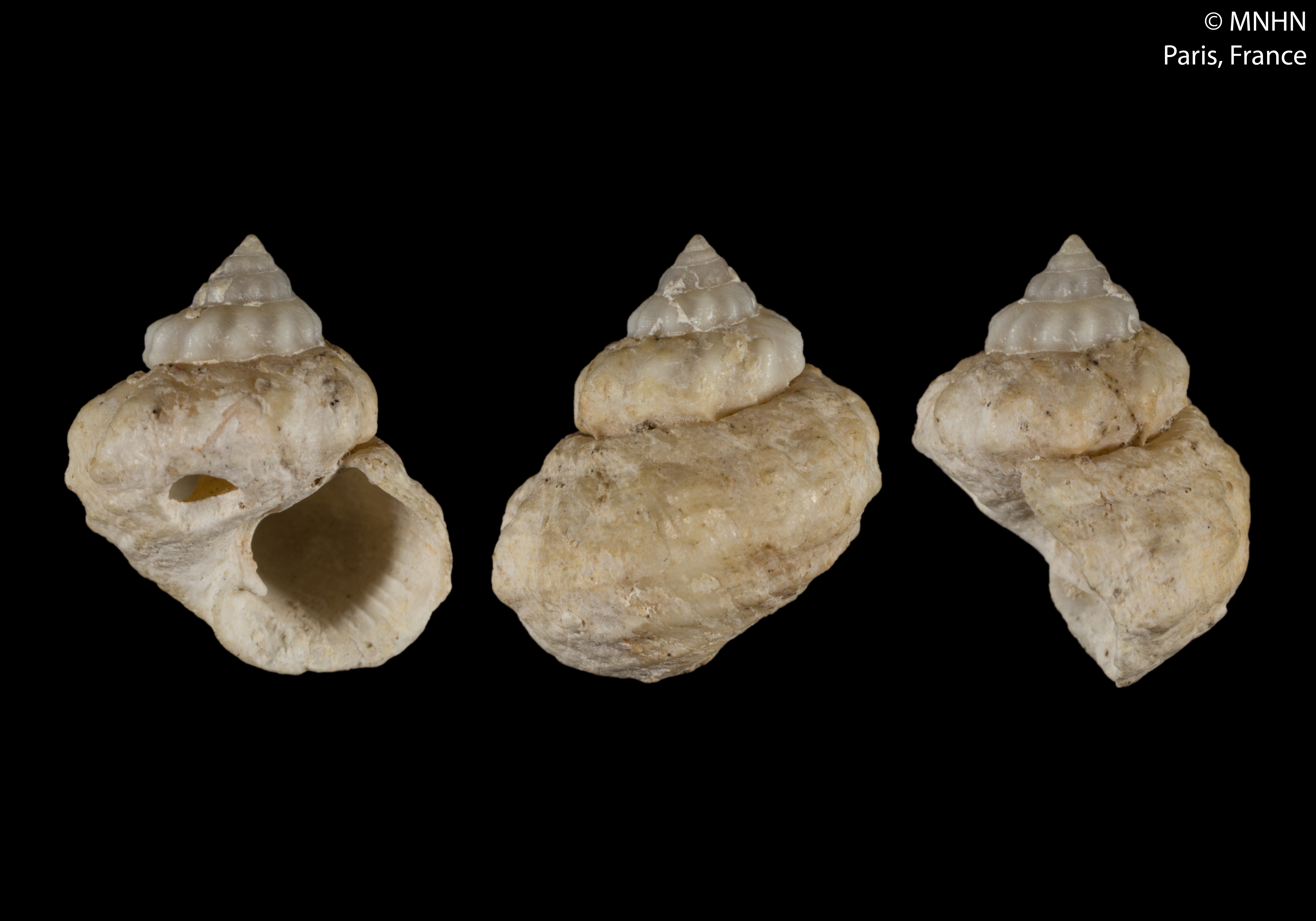
- Shell of Modulus turbinoides (holotype at MNHN, Paris)

Scientific classification
- Kingdom: Animalia
- Phylum: Mollusca
- Class: Gastropoda
- Subclass: Caenogastropoda
- Order: incertae sedis
- Superfamily: Cerithioidea
- Family: Modulidae
- Genus: Modulus; Gray, 1840

Type species
- Trochus modulus Linnaeus, 1758

Synonyms
- Aplodon Rafinesque, 1819; † Pseudotrochus Heilprin, 1886 ( junior homonym of Pseudotrochus Mörch, 1852 [Achatinidae])

= Modulus (gastropod) =

Genus of gastropods

Modulus is a genus of small sea snails, marine gastropod molluscs in the family Modulidae.

== Characteristics ==
(Described as Pseudotrochus) The shell is turbinate and umbilicate, bearing a general resemblance to members of the family Turbinidae or allied groups. However, it differs significantly in the siphonate nature of its aperture. The aperture is round, with the outer lip continuous except at the base, which is truncated by a sharply and obliquely deflected short siphonal canal.

== Species ==
Species within the genus Modulus include:

- Modulus ambiguus Dautzenberg, 1910
- Modulus bayeri Petuch, 2001
- Modulus bermontianus Petuch, 1994
- Modulus cerodes A. Adams, 1851
- Modulus danielsi Petuch & Berschauer, 2023
- Modulus disculus (Philippi, 1846)
- Modulus floridanus Conrad, 1869
- Modulus guernei Dautzenberg, 1900
- Modulus hennequini Petuch, 2013
- Modulus honkerorum Petuch, 2013
- Modulus hunahpu Petuch & Berschauer, 2023
- Modulus kaicherae Petuch, 1987
- Modulus modulus (Linnaeus, 1758) - the type species, known as the "button snail"
- Modulus nodosus Macsotay & Campos, 2001
- Modulus pacei Petuch, 1987
- Modulus turbinoides (Locard, 1897)

Taxa inquirenda

- Modulus duplicatus A. Adams, 1851
- Modulus morleti P. Fischer, 1882
- Modulus obliquus A. Adams, 1851
- Modulus obtusatus (Philippi, 1847)

Species brought into synonymy

- Modulus calusa Petuch, 1988: synonym of Trochomodulus calusa (Petuch, 1988) (original combination)
- Modulus canaliculatus Mörch, 1876: synonym of Modulus modulus (Linnaeus, 1758)
- Modulus candidus Petit de la Saussaye, 1853: synonym of Indomodulus tectum (Gmelin, 1791)
- Modulus carchedonius (Lamarck, 1822): synonym of Trochomodulus carchedonius (Lamarck, 1822)
- Modulus catenulatus (Philippi, 1849): synonym of Trochomodulus catenulatus (Philippi, 1849)
- Modulus cidaris Reeve, 1848: synonym of Modulus tectum (Gmelin, 1791): synonym of Indomodulus tectum (Gmelin, 1791)
- Modulus convexior Mörch, 1876: synonym of Modulus modulus (Linnaeus, 1758)
- Modulus dorsuosus Gould, 1853: synonym of Modulus disculus (Philippi, 1846)
- Modulus krebsii Mörch, 1876: synonym of Modulus modulus (Linnaeus, 1758)
- Modulus lenticularis (Lamarck, 1822): synonym of Modulus modulus (Linnaeus, 1758)
- Modulus lindae Petuch, 1987: synonym of Conomodulus lindae (Petuch, 1987) (superseded combination)
- Modulus obliquatus [sic]: synonym of Modulus obliquus A. Adams, 1851 (misspelling - incorrect original spelling)
- Modulus perlatus (Gmelin, 1791): synonym of Modulus modulus (Linnaeus, 1758)
- Modulus pisum Mörch, 1876: synonym of Modulus modulus (Linnaeus, 1758)
- Modulus tectum (Gmelin, 1791): synonym of Indomodulus tectum (Gmelin, 1791)
- Modulus trochiformis Souleyet, 1852: synonym of Trochomodulus catenulatus (Philippi, 1849)
- Modulus unidens (A. d'Orbigny, 1842): synonym of Modulus modulus (Linnaeus, 1758) (junior subjective synonym)
