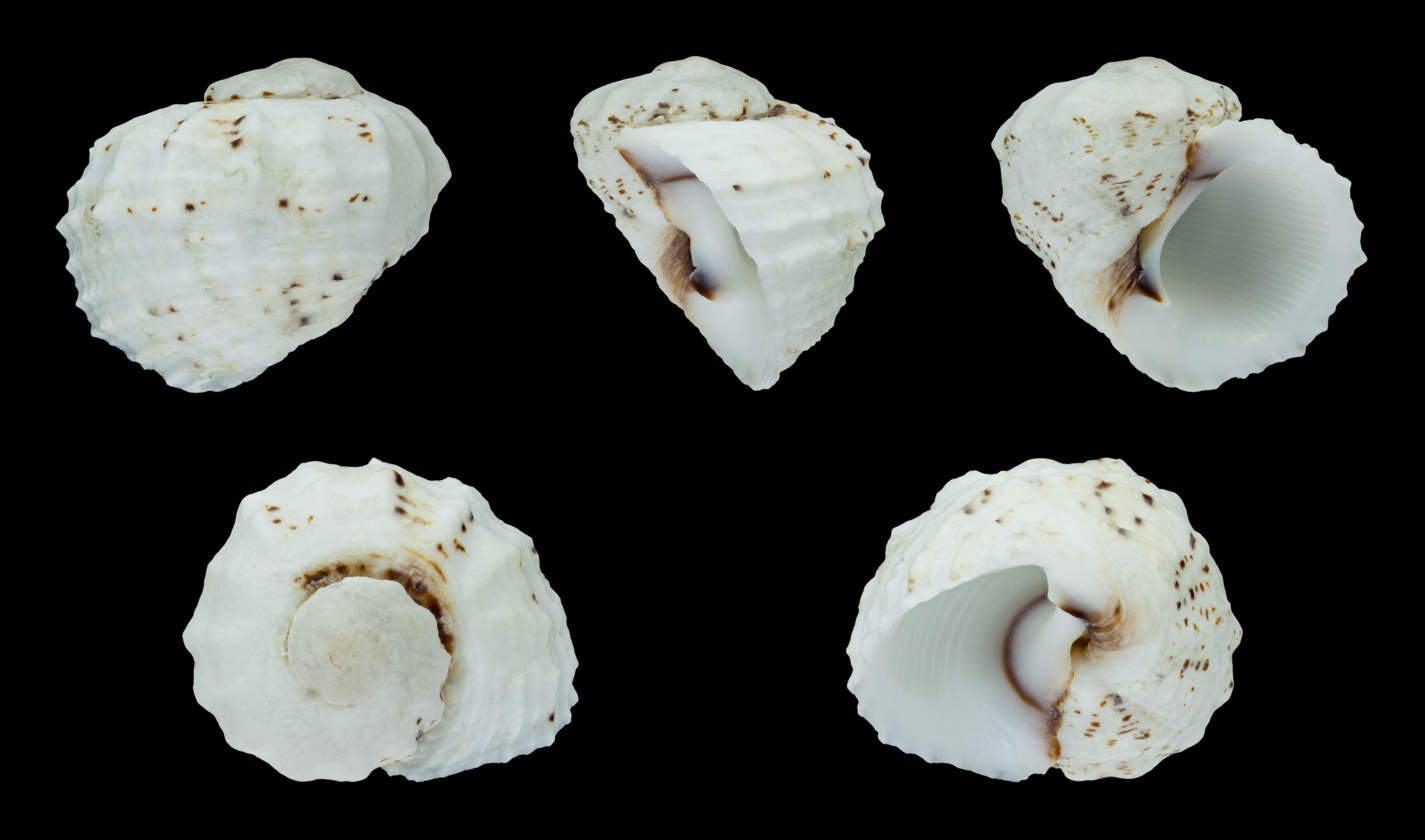
- Indomodulus tectum

Scientific classification
- Kingdom: Animalia
- Phylum: Mollusca
- Class: Gastropoda
- Subclass: Caenogastropoda
- Order: incertae sedis
- Superfamily: Cerithioidea
- Family: Modulidae
- Genus: Trochomodulus; Landau, Vermeij & Reich, 2014

Type species
- Trochus catenulatus Philippi, 1849

= Trochomodulus =

Genus of gastropods

Trochomodulus is a genus of small sea snails, marine gastropod molluscs in the family Modulidae.

== Species ==
- Trochomodulus basileus (Guppy, 1873)
- Trochomodulus calusa (Petuch, 1988)
- Trochomodulus carchedonius (Lamarck, 1822)
- Trochomodulus catenulatus (Philippi, 1849)
- Trochomodulus velai Petuch & Berschauer, 2023
