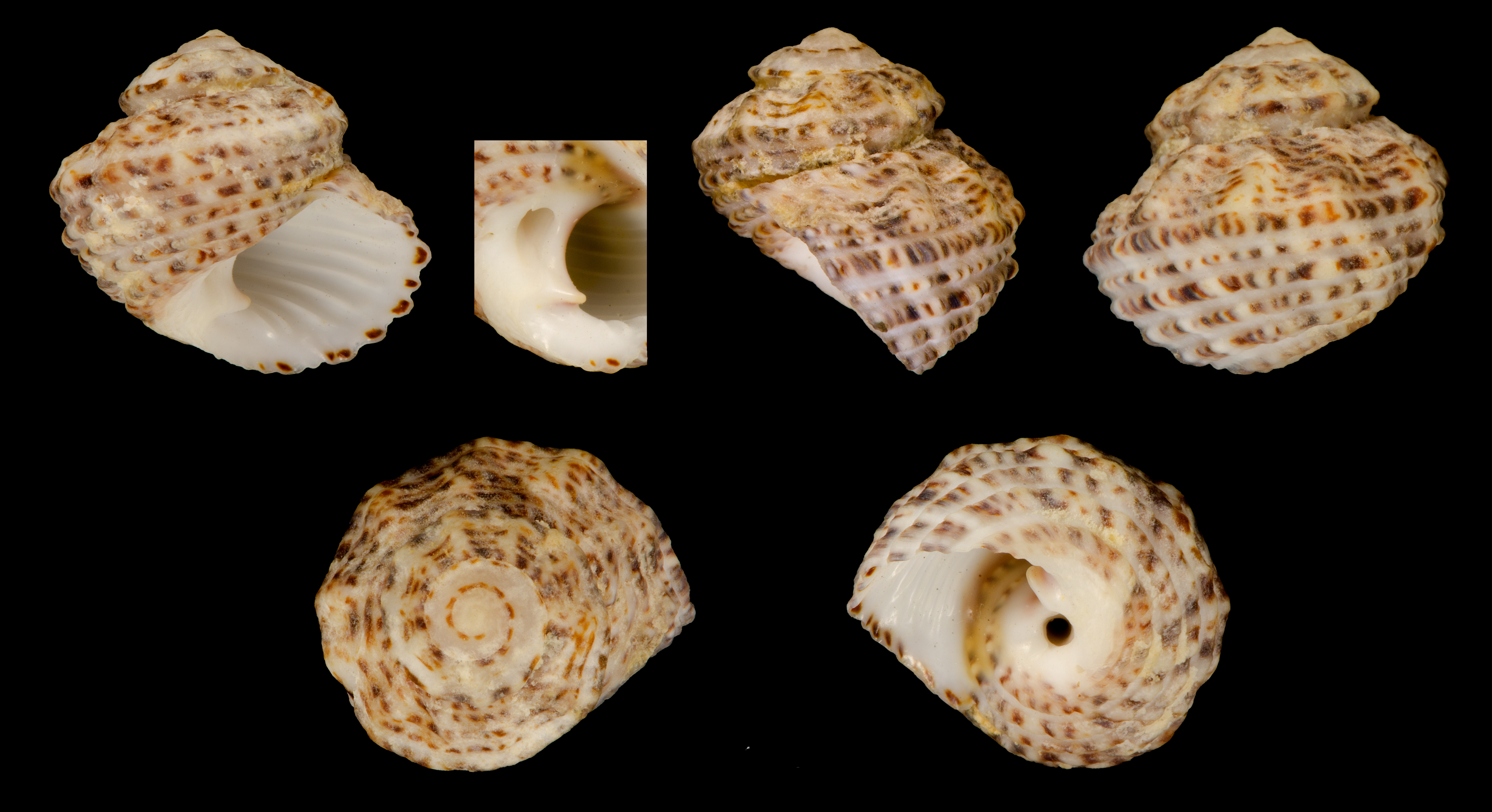
- Shell of Modulus pacei (holotype at the Smithsonian Institution)

Scientific classification
- Kingdom: Animalia
- Phylum: Mollusca
- Class: Gastropoda
- Subclass: Caenogastropoda
- Order: incertae sedis
- Superfamily: Cerithioidea
- Family: Modulidae
- Genus: Modulus
- Species: M. pacei

Binomial name
- Modulus pacei Petuch, 1987

= Modulus pacei =

Species of gastropod

Modulus pacei is a species of sea snail, a marine gastropod mollusc in the family Modulidae.

== Distribution ==
This marine species occurs off Palm Beach Island, Florida.
