= Modulus hunahpu =

Scientific classification
- Kingdom: Animalia
- Phylum: Mollusca
- Class: Gastropoda
- Subclass: Caenogastropoda
- Order: incertae sedis
- Superfamily: Cerithioidea
- Family: Modulidae
- Genus: Modulus
- Species: M. hunahpu

Binomial name
- Modulus hunahpu Petuch & Berschauer, 2023

Species of gastropod

Modulus hunahpu is a species of sea snail, a marine gastropod mollusc in the family Modulidae.

== Distribution ==
This marine species in the Gulf of Mexico occurs off Yucatan.
