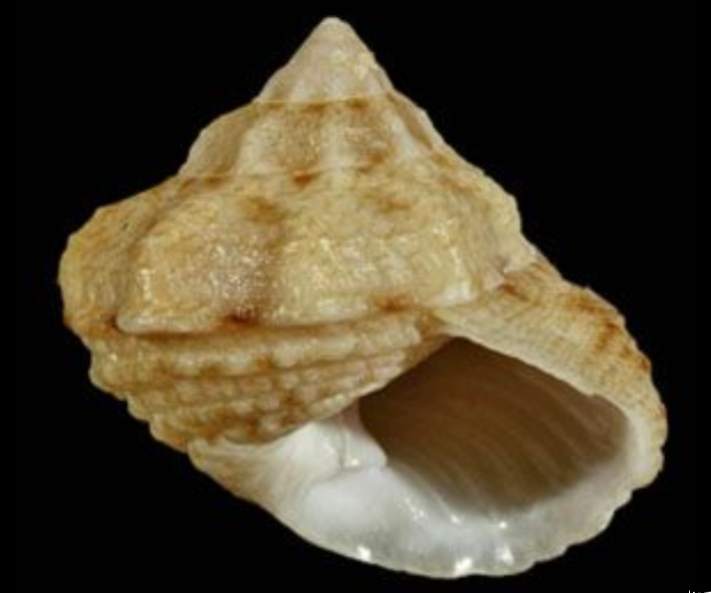
- Shell of Modulus bayeri (specimen at the Natural History Museum, Rotterdam)

Scientific classification
- Kingdom: Animalia
- Phylum: Mollusca
- Class: Gastropoda
- Subclass: Caenogastropoda
- Order: incertae sedis
- Superfamily: Cerithioidea
- Family: Modulidae
- Genus: Modulus
- Species: M. bayeri

Binomial name
- Modulus bayeri Petuch, 2001

= Modulus bayeri =

Species of gastropod

Modulus bayeri is a species of sea snail, a marine gastropod mollusc in the family Modulidae.

== Distribution ==
This marine species occurs off Brazil.

== Description ==
The maximum recorded shell length is 18 mm.

== Habitat ==
Minimum recorded depth is 2 m. Maximum recorded depth is 2 m.
