= Modulus honkerorum =

Scientific classification
- Kingdom: Animalia
- Phylum: Mollusca
- Class: Gastropoda
- Subclass: Caenogastropoda
- Order: incertae sedis
- Superfamily: Cerithioidea
- Family: Modulidae
- Genus: Modulus
- Species: M. honkerorum

Binomial name
- Modulus honkerorum Petuch, 2013

Species of gastropod

Modulus honkerorum is a species of sea snail, a marine gastropod mollusc in the family Modulidae.

== Distribution ==
This marine species occurs off The Bahamas.
