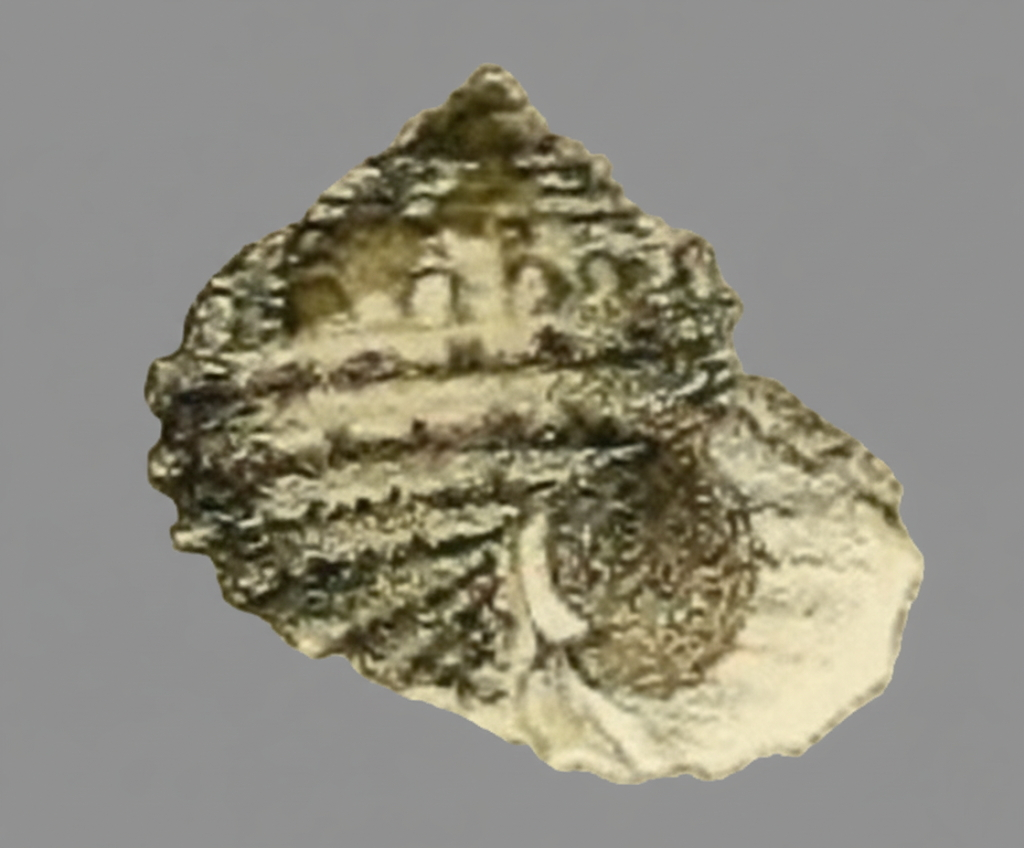
- Shell of Modulus floridanus (holotype)

Scientific classification
- Kingdom: Animalia
- Phylum: Mollusca
- Class: Gastropoda
- Subclass: Caenogastropoda
- Order: incertae sedis
- Superfamily: Cerithioidea
- Family: Modulidae
- Genus: Modulus
- Species: M. floridanus

Binomial name
- Modulus floridanus Conrad, 1869

= Modulus floridanus =

Species of gastropod

Modulus floridanus is a species of sea snail, a marine gastropod mollusc in the family Modulidae.

== Description ==
(Original description) The shell is suborbicular, comprising five whorls that are channelled at the suture. The penultimate and ultimate whorls exhibit transverse nodular ribs. A slightly nodular revolving rib is present at the base of the spire's whorls, continuing onto the body whorl below the transverse ribs. The shoulder is rounded. On the body whorl, there are eight rounded, slightly nodular revolving ribs.

The shell is white with black spots. The columellar tooth is oblique, perfectly straight, and tinged with purple. The umbilicus is small, and the columella is concave and purple. The operculum is round and concave.

== Distribution ==
This marine species occurs off Florida, USA.
