= Modulus bermontianus =

Scientific classification
- Kingdom: Animalia
- Phylum: Mollusca
- Class: Gastropoda
- Subclass: Caenogastropoda
- Order: incertae sedis
- Superfamily: Cerithioidea
- Family: Modulidae
- Genus: Modulus
- Species: M. bermontianus

Binomial name
- Modulus bermontianus Petuch, 1994

Species of gastropod

Modulus bermontianus is a species of sea snail, a marine gastropod mollusc in the family Modulidae.

== Distribution ==
This marine species occurs off Florida, USA.
