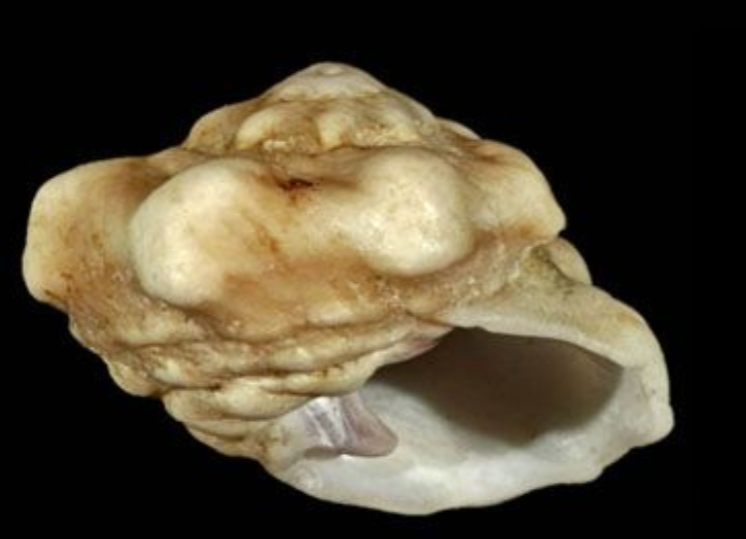
- Shell of Modulus cerodes (specimen at the Natural History Museum, Rotterdam)

Scientific classification
- Kingdom: Animalia
- Phylum: Mollusca
- Class: Gastropoda
- Subclass: Caenogastropoda
- Order: incertae sedis
- Superfamily: Cerithioidea
- Family: Modulidae
- Genus: Modulus
- Species: M. cerodes

Binomial name
- Modulus cerodes A. Adams, 1851

= Modulus cerodes =

Species of gastropod

Modulus cerodes is a species of sea snail, a marine gastropod mollusc in the family Modulidae.

== Description ==
The length of the shell attains 14 mm.

(Original description in Latin) The shell is turbinate and umbilicate. It is whitish, sparsely stained with brown, and smooth. The whorls are rounded and flattened above, adorned in the middle with a bituberculate band (two knob-like projections), and below with nodulose bands (covered with small nodes ). The aperture is round. The inner lip is tinged with purple, and the outer lip is smooth on the inside. The umbilicus is deep and partly covered by a columellar callus.

== Distribution ==
This marine species occurs off Sinaloa, Mexico.
