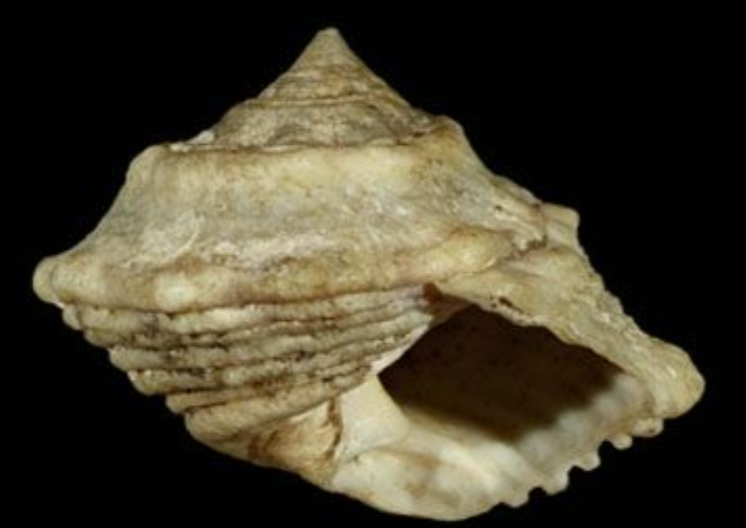
- Shell of Modulus disculus (specimen at the Natural History Museum, Rotterdam)

Scientific classification
- Kingdom: Animalia
- Phylum: Mollusca
- Class: Gastropoda
- Subclass: Caenogastropoda
- Order: incertae sedis
- Superfamily: Cerithioidea
- Family: Modulidae
- Genus: Modulus
- Species: M. disculus

Binomial name
- Modulus disculus (R. A. Philippi, 1846)

Synonyms
- Modulus dorsuosus A. Gould, 1853 junior subjective synonym; Trochus disculus R. A. Philippi, 1846 superseded combination

= Modulus disculus =

Species of gastropod

Modulus disculus is a species of sea snail, a marine gastropod mollusc in the family Modulidae.

== Description ==
The length of the shell attains 17 mm.

(Original description in Latin) The conical shell is nearly imperforate. It is gibbous at the base, and transversely furrowed. It is white, dotted with red, and girdled with sharp nodules superiorly at the suture and on the periphery. The purplish columella is arched, terminating in a very sharp denticle.

(Described as Modulus dorsuosus) This is a small, solid, depressed, ovate-conic shell, dead white in color. The upper whorls appear eroded, and the ultimate whorl is angulate, flattened or slightly excavated dorsally. Obsolete radiating folds subtly vary this surface, making the periphery nodulous. These nodules somewhat extend onto the conical base, which features approximately six spiral grooves, one of which transects the nodules. Occasional faint dusky markings may be observed between the tubercles and on the basal ridges.

The aperture is subtriangular, with a sharp, internally grooved lip. The umbilicus is small. The columellar tooth and columella are tinted pale rose-red.

== Distribution ==
This marine species occurs in the Baja California, Mexico.
