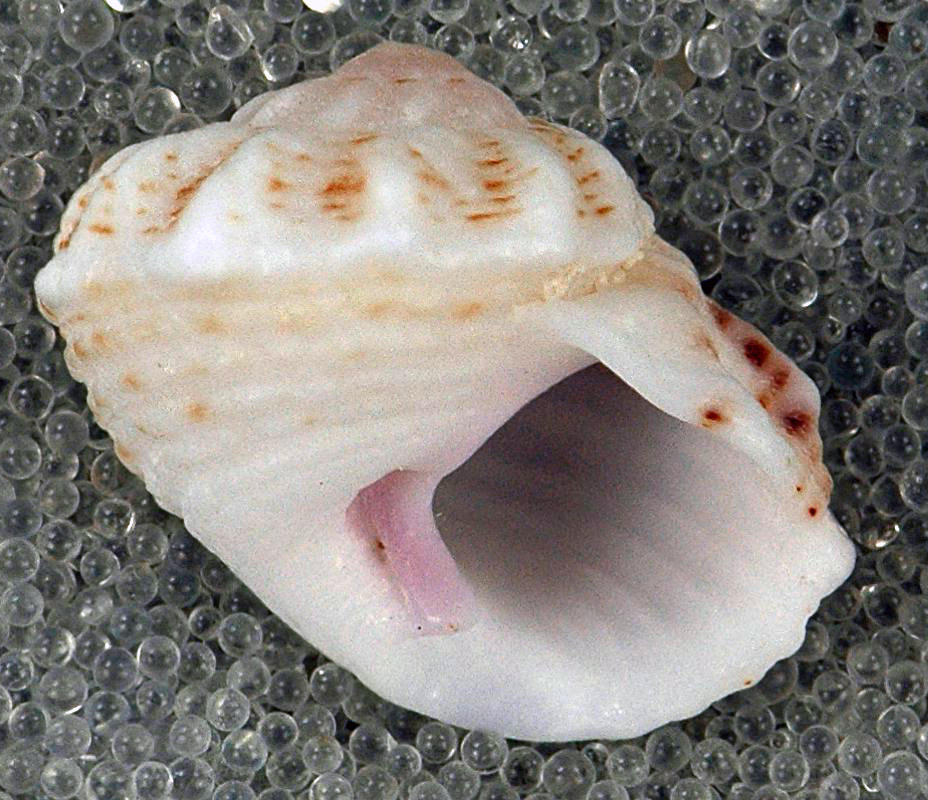

Scientific classification
- Kingdom: Animalia
- Phylum: Mollusca
- Class: Gastropoda
- Subclass: Caenogastropoda
- Order: incertae sedis
- Family: Modulidae
- Genus: Modulus
- Species: M. modulus

Binomial name
- Modulus modulus (Linnaeus, 1758)

Synonyms
- Ethalia tasmanica Tenison Woods, 1877 (junior synonym); Modulus canaliculatus Mörch, 1876; Modulus convexior Mörch, 1876; Modulus krebsii Mörch, 1876; Modulus lenticularis (Lamarck, 1822) junior subjective synonym; Modulus perlatus (Gmelin, 1791); Modulus pisum Mörch, 1876; Modulus unidens (A. d'Orbigny, 1842) junior subjective synonym; Trochus filosus Helbling, 1779 junior subjective synonym; Trochus lenticularis Chemnitz, 1781 unavailable name; Trochus modulus Linnaeus, 1758 (original combination); Trochus perlatus Gmelin, 1791; Trochus unidens A. d'Orbigny, 1842 junior subjective synonym

= Modulus modulus =

Species of gastropod

Modulus modulus, commonly known as the buttonsnail, is a species of small sea snail, a marine gastropod mollusc in the family Modulidae.

== Distribution ==
This species occurs in the Caribbean Sea and includes both the east and west coast of Florida.

== Description ==
The maximum recorded shell length is 16.5 mm. The overall shape of the shell is button-like, with a gray or brown streaked, ridge-sculptured body whorl and a low spire.

== Habitat ==
The minimum recorded depth is 0 m. The maximum recorded depth is 105 m.

Found in shell grit and coral sand, among sea grass beds -at 2 to 3 feet depth.
