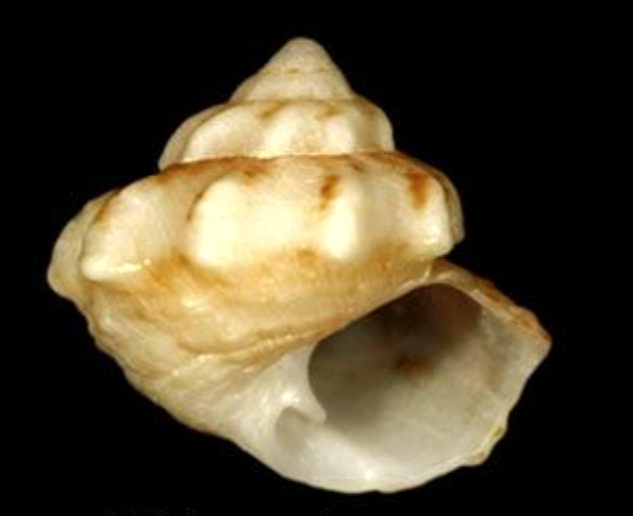
- Shell of Modulus guernei (specimen at the Natural History Museum, Rotterdam)

Scientific classification
- Kingdom: Animalia
- Phylum: Mollusca
- Class: Gastropoda
- Subclass: Caenogastropoda
- Order: incertae sedis
- Superfamily: Cerithioidea
- Family: Modulidae
- Genus: Modulus
- Species: M. guernei

Binomial name
- Modulus guernei Dautzenberg, 1900

= Modulus guernei =

Species of gastropod

Modulus guernei is a species of sea snail, a marine gastropod mollusc in the family Modulidae.

== Description ==
The length of the shell attains 11 mm, its diameter 11 mm.

(Original description in French) The shell is solid, turbinate, and narrowly umbilicate. Its spire is conical, rather elevated, and acute at the apex, comprising six whorls. These whorls are separated by a distinct suture and adorned with large, tuberculous longitudinal folds. On the body whorl, these 10 folds terminate at the periphery, projecting distinctly outwards. The base of the body whorl is convex, ornamented with a few flattened and irregular concentric cords.

The aperture is rounded. The columellar margin is arched and narrow, widening at the base to form a prominent transverse tooth. The umbilical region is delimited by an acute keel that merges basally with the apertural margin. The outer lip is simple and sharp.

The coloration is a dirty greenish-white, sparsely marked with brown punctations. A faintly defined brownish subsutural zone is sometimes present, extending below the periphery of the body whorl.

== Distribution ==
This species occurs in the Atlantic Ocean off Cape Verde.
