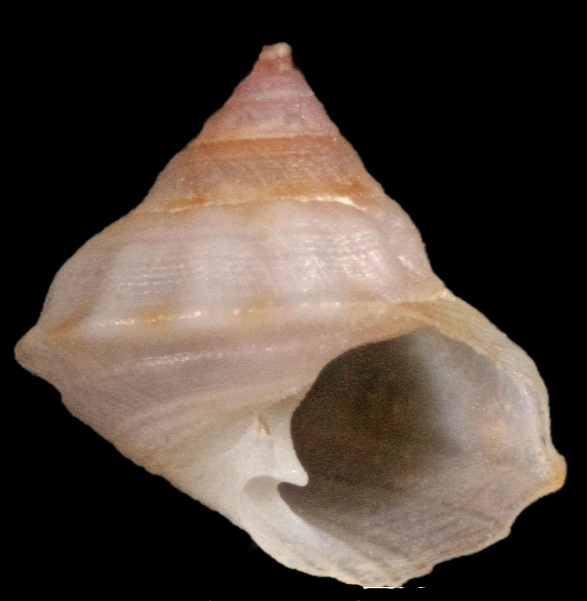
- Shell of Modulus ambiguus (specimen at Naturalis Biodiversity Center)

Scientific classification
- Kingdom: Animalia
- Phylum: Mollusca
- Class: Gastropoda
- Subclass: Caenogastropoda
- Order: incertae sedis
- Family: Modulidae
- Genus: Modulus
- Species: M. ambiguus

Binomial name
- Modulus ambiguus Dautzenberg, 1912

= Modulus ambiguus =

Species of gastropod

Modulus ambiguus is a species of sea snail, a marine gastropod mollusc in the family Modulidae.

== Description ==
The length of the shell attains 8 mm, its diameter 5 mm.

(Original description in French) The shell is umbilicate, solid, and turbinate. The conoidal spire is moderately elevated, comprising four convex whorls separated by a bordered suture. Above the suture, a funicle (a cord-like or rope-like structure) is present, which transitions into a prominently projecting keel on the body whorl. The embryonic whorls are smooth, while subsequent whorls are adorned with strong, arched, and very prominent axial ribs that impart a gibbous appearance, along with very irregular decurrent cords. Under magnification, numerous oblique growth striae are also observable.

The base of the body whorl, below the peripheral cord where the axial ribs terminate, features three large cords separated by interspaces approximately as wide as the cords themselves. Closer to the umbilicus, three additional, much weaker, and more closely spaced cords are present.

The aperture is subquadrangular (somewhat square). The columella is arched and terminates basally in a strong transverse fold. The outer lip is arched and plicate on its inner side.

The shell's coloration is whitish, obscurely maculated with brown. The peripheral cord and the large basal cords are rather distinctly articulated with brown.

== Distribution ==
This marine species occurs in the Atlantic Ocean off Cape Verde.
