= Modulus nodosus =

Scientific classification
- Kingdom: Animalia
- Phylum: Mollusca
- Class: Gastropoda
- Subclass: Caenogastropoda
- Order: incertae sedis
- Family: Modulidae
- Genus: Modulus
- Species: M. nodosus

Binomial name
- Modulus nodosus Macsotay & Villarroel, 2001

Species of gastropod

Modulus nodosus is a species of sea snail, a marine gastropod mollusc in the family Modulidae.

== Distribution ==
This marine species occurs in the Caribbean Sea off Venezuela.

== Description ==
The maximum recorded shell length is 29.9 mm.

== Habitat ==
Minimum recorded depth is 10 m. Maximum recorded depth is 30 m.
