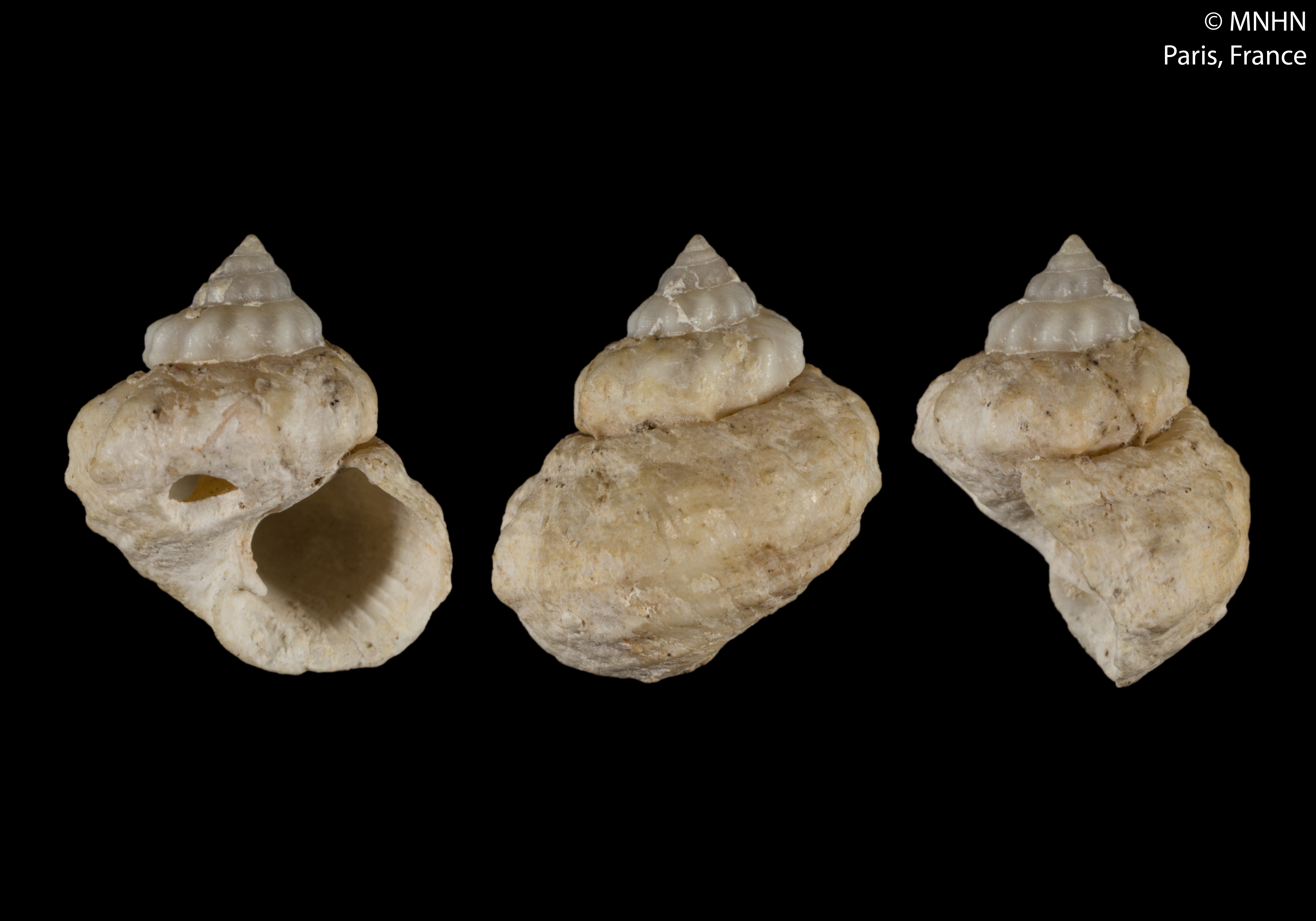
- Shell of Modulus turbinoides (holotype at MNHN, Paris)

Scientific classification
- Kingdom: Animalia
- Phylum: Mollusca
- Class: Gastropoda
- Subclass: Caenogastropoda
- Order: incertae sedis
- Family: Modulidae
- Genus: Modulus
- Species: M. turbinoides

Binomial name
- Modulus turbinoides (Locard, 1897)

Synonyms
- Tectarium turbinoides Locard, 1897

= Modulus turbinoides =

Species of gastropod

Modulus turbinoides is a species of sea snail, a marine gastropod mollusc in the family Modulidae.

== Description ==
Modulus turbinoidesis attains a length of 12 mm and a diameter of 10 mm.

The shell is of a rather small size, with a subtectiform outline, slightly more developed below than above. The spire is quite high and acuminated, composed of 6 well-staged whorls. Its growth is initially regular and progressive, then becoming more rapid in diameter in the last two whorls. The first whorls have a convex profile; the penultimate is somewhat flat above and sloping, then almost vertical. The body whorl shares the same profile at its origin, then gradually rounds towards its extremity, equaling almost 3/5 of the total height. The suture is undulated and slightly channeled on the body whorl. The apex is small and smooth, surmounting one or two embryonic whorls that also appear smooth and shiny. The umbilicus is masked by the development of the columellar margin.

The aperture is slightly smaller than half of the total height, subrounded but a little irregular, and subangular laterally at the level of the keel. It is inscribed in a distinctly oblique plane. The peristome is simple with subcontinuous margins. The outer margin is sharp, inserting high up in the middle of the penultimate whorl, with a plano-oblique profile in the upper part, then subangular laterally, and rounded at the bottom. The columellar margin is arched, equipped with a strong callus in the upper part and a very pronounced, thin, tooth-like fold in the lower part, which extends slightly downwards and continues internally.

The shell material is not very thick but quite solid and subopaque. It is adorned with longitudinal costulations and decurrent cords. The longitudinal costulations are nodulous, not very prominent, and cover the whorls after the embryonic ones. There are 12 on the penultimate whorl, and they are large, rounded, and oblique from right to left, extending from top to bottom of the whorls. They leave intercostal spaces of roughly the same width and also extend onto the body whorl, but only in its upper part, where they tend to become increasingly indistinct. The decurrent cords are diversely distributed; only one basal cord is present above the suture on the whorls following the embryonic ones. This cord becomes carinal on the body whorl, delimiting the lower extension of the longitudinal costulations. Below the body whorl, between the keel and the umbilicus, four or five narrow cords are present, between which strong and irregular oblique costulations extend.

The coloration is a light reddish white.

== Distribution ==
This marine species occurs off Cape Verde. It can also be found in the Mediterranean Sea and off Portugal.
