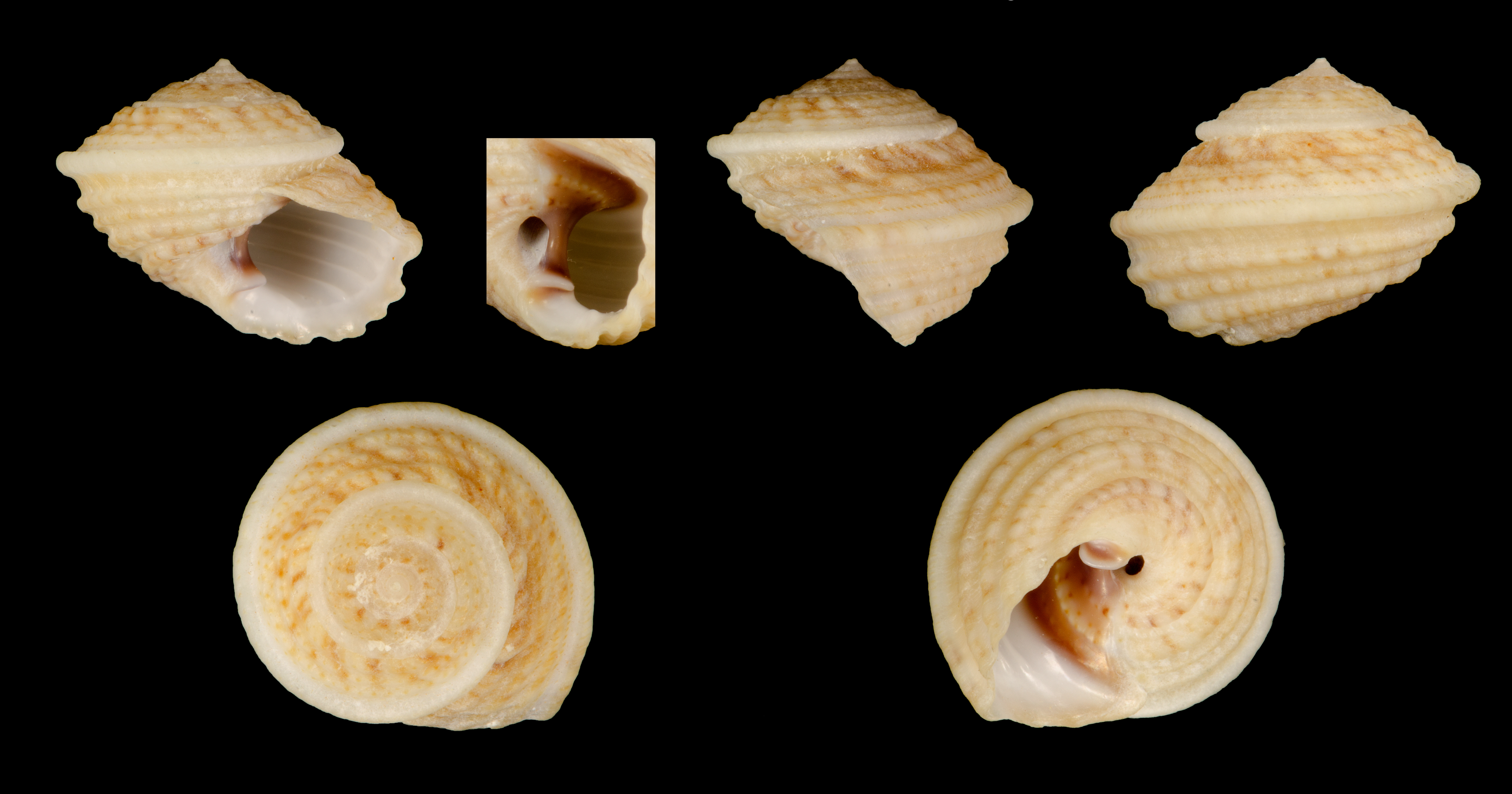
- Shell of Trochomodulus calusa (holotype at the Smithsonian Institution)

Scientific classification
- Kingdom: Animalia
- Phylum: Mollusca
- Class: Gastropoda
- Subclass: Caenogastropoda
- Order: incertae sedis
- Family: Modulidae
- Genus: Trochomodulus
- Species: T. calusa

Binomial name
- Trochomodulus calusa (Petuch, 1988)

Synonyms
- Modulus calusa Petuch (1988)

= Trochomodulus calusa =

Species of gastropod

Trochomodulus calusa is a species of sea snail, a marine gastropod mollusk in the family Modulidae.

Subspecies

- Trochomodulus calusa calusa (Petuch, 1988)
- Trochomodulus calusa foxhalli (Petuch & R. F. Myers, 2014)

== Description ==
The maximum recorded shell length is 15 mm.

== Habitat ==
Minimum recorded depth is 1.5 m. Maximum recorded depth is 1.5 m.
