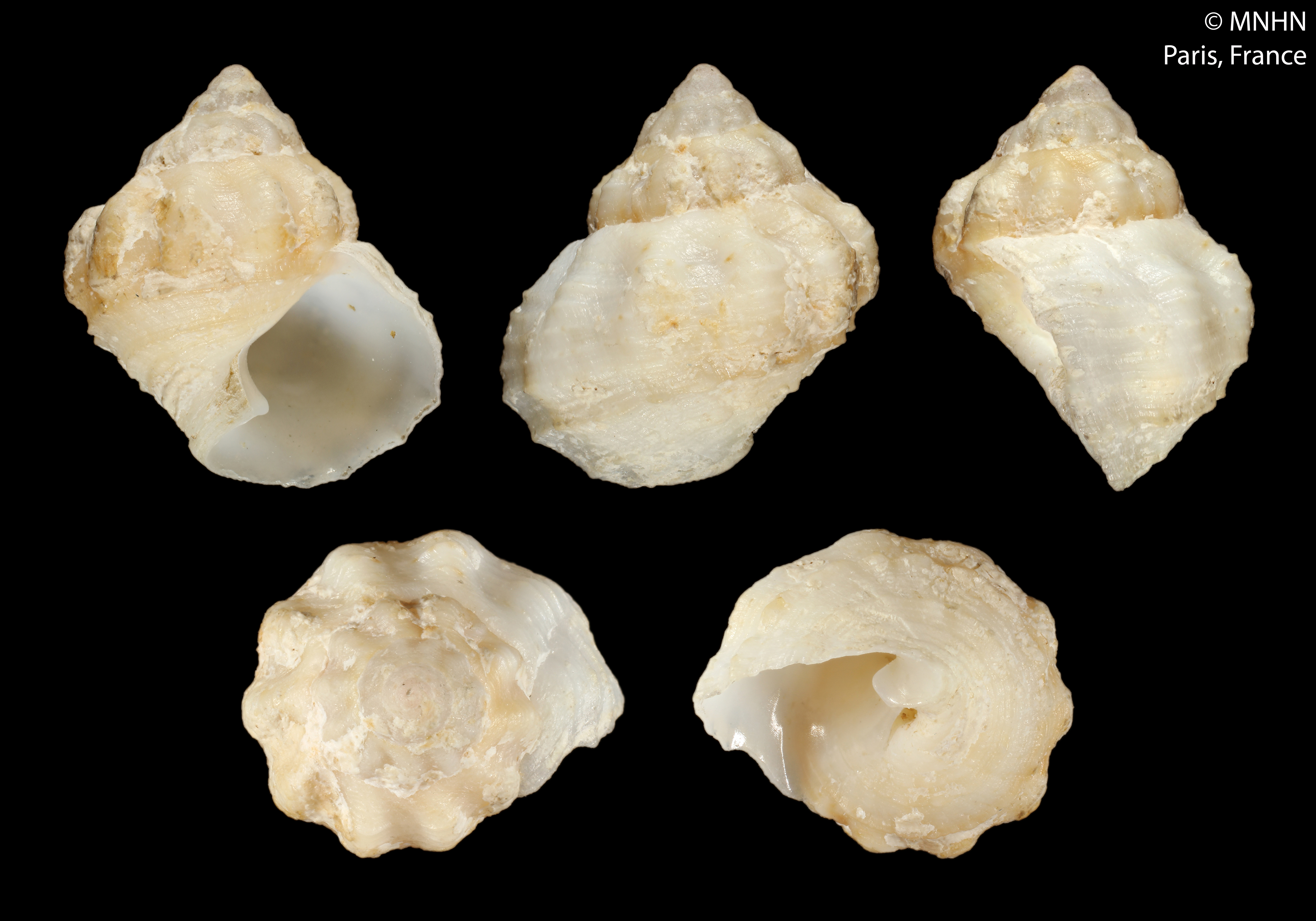
- Shell of Conomodulus neocaledonensis (holotype at the National Museum of Natural History, France)

Scientific classification
- Kingdom: Animalia
- Phylum: Mollusca
- Class: Gastropoda
- Subclass: Caenogastropoda
- Order: incertae sedis
- Family: Modulidae
- Genus: Conomodulus; Landau, Vermeij & Reich, 2014

Type species
- †Modulus preangerensis K. Martin, 1905

= Conomodulus =

Genus of gastropods

Conomodulus is a small genus of sea snails representing one extinct and one extant species. This genus of snails was first formally named in 2014 by Bernard Landau, Geerat J. Vermeij, and Sonja Reich. The name Conomodulus refers to the conical spire and familial name, Modulidae.

== Species ==
- † Conomodulus altispira Landau & Breitenberger, 2025
- † Conomodulus forticostatus Landau & Breitenberger, 2025
- Conomodulus lambi Petuch & Berschauer, 2023
- Conomodulus lindae (Petuch, 1987)
- Conomodulus neocaledonensis Lozouet & Krygelmans, 2016
- †Conomodulus preangerensis (K. Martin, 1905)
- † Conomodulus renemai Landau, Vermeij & Reich, 2014
