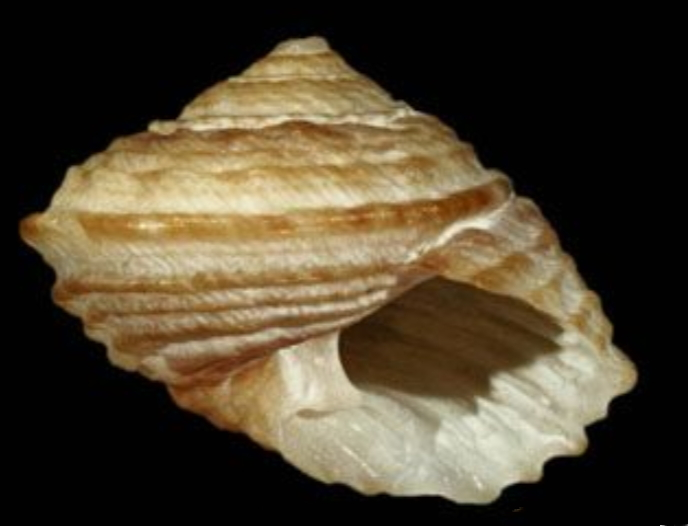
- Shell of Trochomodulus carchedonius (specimen in the Natural History Museum, Rotterdam)

Scientific classification
- Kingdom: Animalia
- Phylum: Mollusca
- Class: Gastropoda
- Subclass: Caenogastropoda
- Order: incertae sedis
- Family: Modulidae
- Genus: Trochomodulus
- Species: T. carchedonius

Binomial name
- Trochomodulus carchedonius (Lamarck, 1822)

Synonyms
- Modulus carchedonius (Lamarck, 1822); Monodonta carchedonius Lamarck, 1822 (original combination)

= Trochomodulus carchedonius =

Species of gastropod

Trochomodulus carchedonius is a species of small sea snail, a marine gastropod mollusc in the family Modulidae.

== Description ==
The maximum recorded shell length is 17 millimetres (0.67 in).

== Habitat ==
The minimum recorded depth for this species is 0 m; the maximum recorded depth is 29 metres (95 ft).
