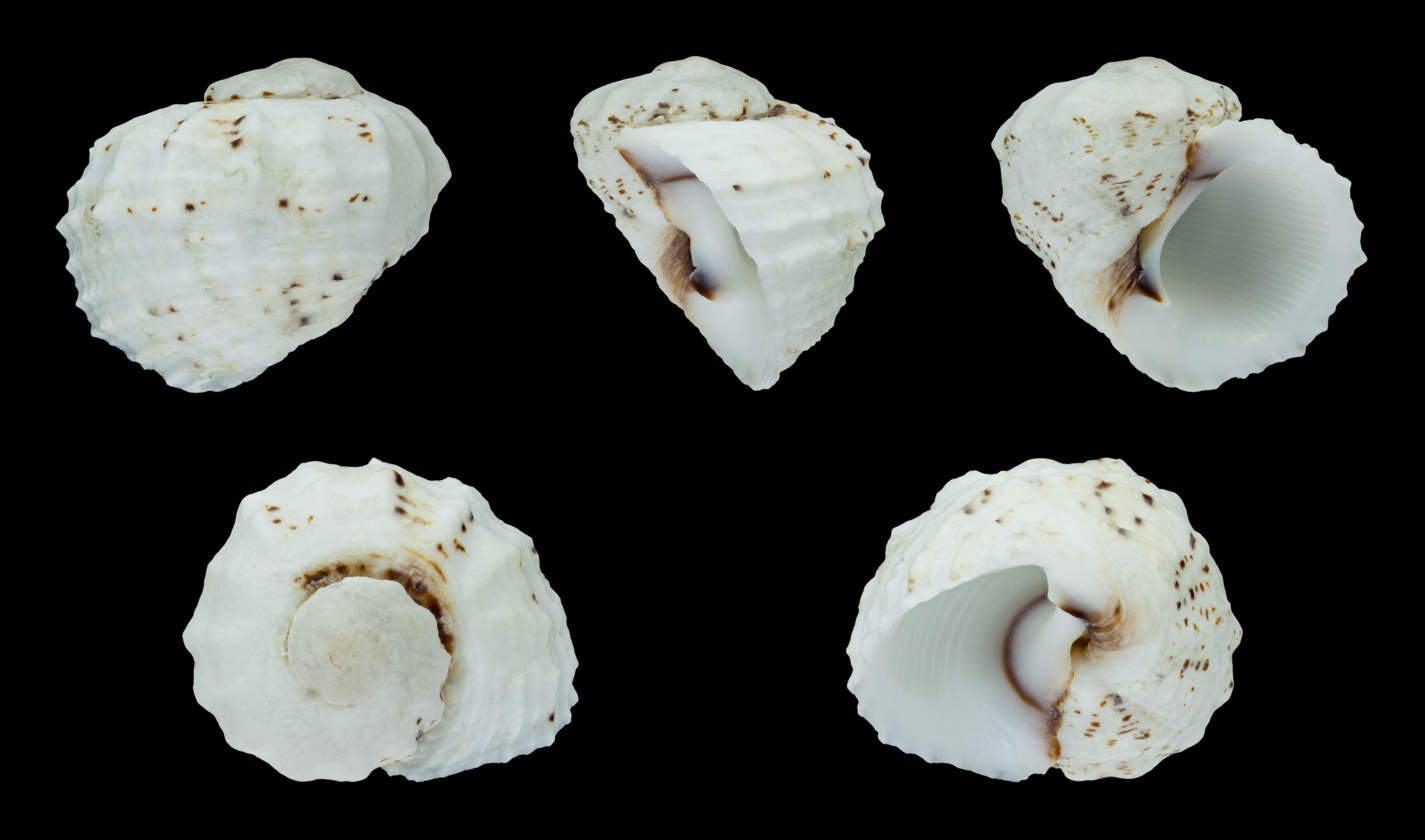

Scientific classification
- Kingdom: Animalia
- Phylum: Mollusca
- Class: Gastropoda
- Subclass: Caenogastropoda
- Order: incertae sedis
- Family: Modulidae
- Genus: Indomodulus
- Species: I. tectum

Binomial name
- Indomodulus tectum (Gmelin, 1791)

Synonyms
- Modulus candidus Petit de la Saussaye, 1853; Modulus cidaris Reeve, 1848; Modulus tectum (Gmelin, 1791); Monodonta retusa Lamarck, 1816; Trochus tectum Gmelin, 1791 (original combination)

= Indomodulus tectum =

Species of gastropod

Indomodulus tectum is a species of small sea snail, a marine gastropod mollusc in the family Modulidae.
