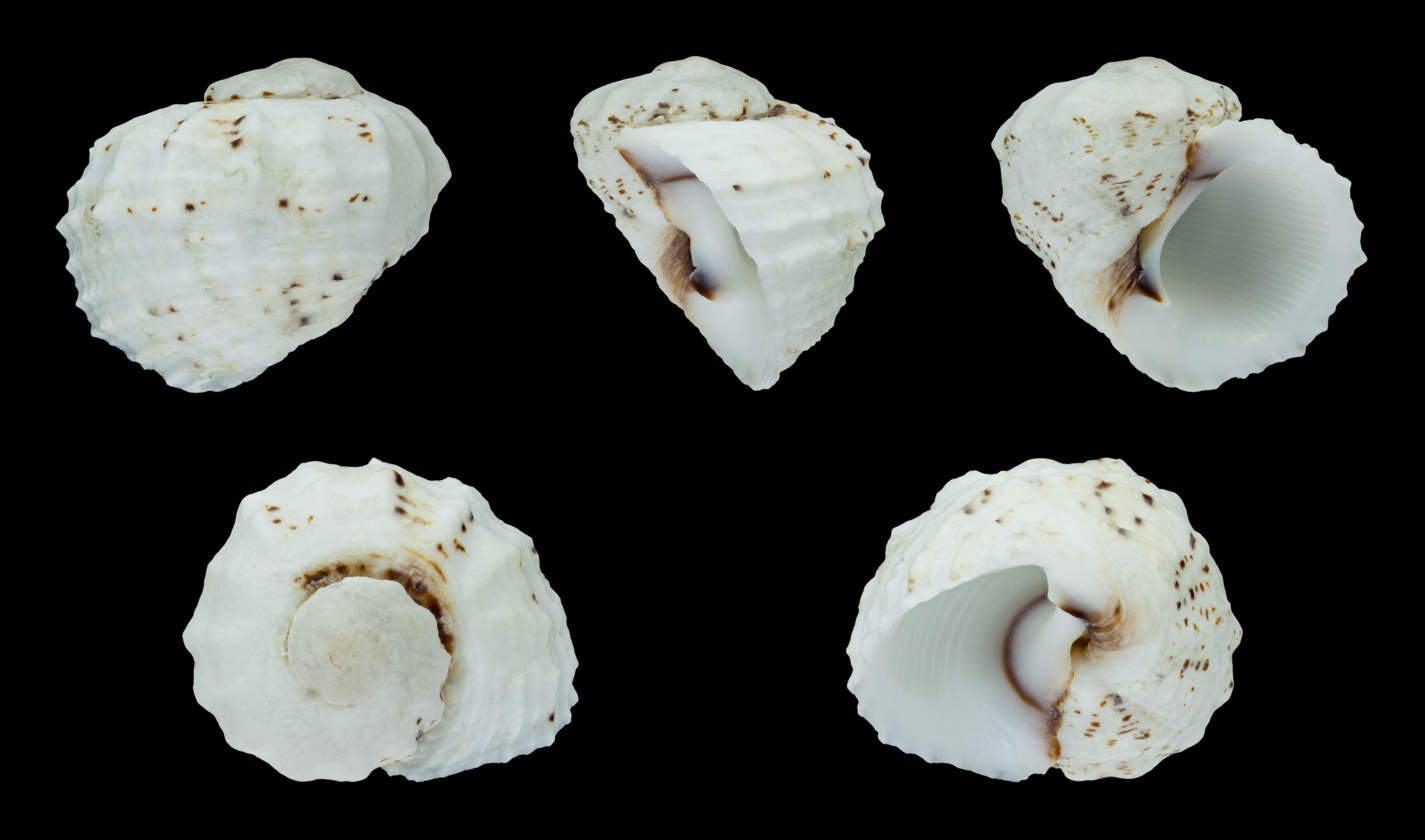
- Indomodulus tectum

Scientific classification
- Kingdom: Animalia
- Phylum: Mollusca
- Class: Gastropoda
- Subclass: Caenogastropoda
- Order: incertae sedis
- Superfamily: Cerithioidea
- Family: Modulidae; P. Fischer, 1884

Synonyms
- Aplodontidae Kuroda, 1933

= Modulidae =

Modulidae Temporal range: Late Triassic–Recent

Family of gastropods

Modulidae, common name modulids, is a family of small sea snails, marine gastropod molluscs in the superfamily Cerithioidea.

According to the taxonomy of the Gastropoda by Bouchet & Rocroi (2005) the family Modulidae has no subfamilies.

== Genera ==
Genera within the family Modulidae include:

- Conomodulus Landau, Vermeij & Reich, 2014
- † Incisilabium Cossmann, 1918
- Indomodulus Landau, Vermeij & Reich, 2014
- † Laevimodulus Landau, Vermeij & Reich, 2014
- † Modulostylina Bandel, 2006 - with the only species Modulostylina waageni Kittl, 1884 - from Late Triassic
- Modulus Gray, 1840 - the type genus of the family Modulidae
- † Psammodulus Collins, 1934
- Trochomodulus Landau, Vermeij & Reich, 2014

Synonyms

- Aplodon Rafinesque, 1819: synonym of Modulus Gray, 1842 (senior synonym of Modulus which, however, is in prevailing usage)
