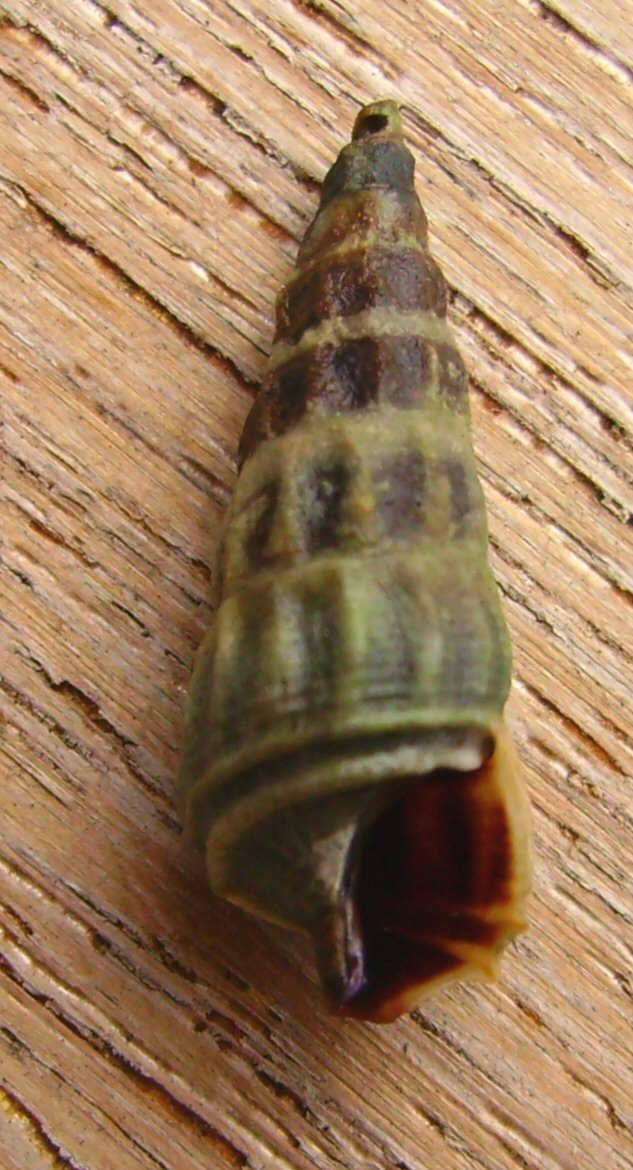
- Apertural view of a beachworn shell of Zeacumantus lutulentus.

Scientific classification
- Kingdom: Animalia
- Phylum: Mollusca
- Class: Gastropoda
- Subclass: Caenogastropoda
- Order: incertae sedis
- Family: Batillariidae
- Genus: Zeacumantus; Finlay, 1926

Type species
- Cerithium subcarinatum G.B. Sowerby II, 1855

Species
- See text

= Zeacumantus =

Genus of gastropods

Zeacumantus is a genus of small to medium-sized sea snails or mud snails, marine gastropod mollusks in the family Batillariidae.

This genus is sometimes still treated as if it were a subgenus of the genus Batillaria (Batillariidae).

== Species ==
Species in the genus include:

- Zeacumantus diemenensis (Quoy, JRC & JP Gaimard, 1834)
- Zeacumantus lutulentus (Kiener, 1841)
- Zeacumantus plumbeus(G. B. Sowerby II, 1855)
- Zeacumantus subcarinatus (Sowerby, 1855)

Synonyms:

- Zeacumantus delicatus Laws, 1950 is a synonym of Pyrazus ebeninus (Bruguière, 1792)
