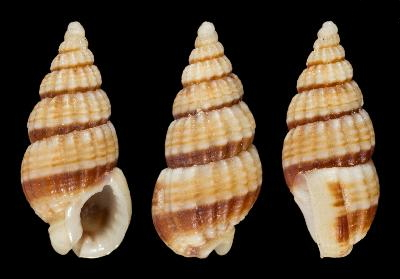
- Shell of Reticunassa annabolteae (holotype at MNHN, Paris)

Scientific classification
- Kingdom: Animalia
- Phylum: Mollusca
- Class: Gastropoda
- Subclass: Caenogastropoda
- Order: Neogastropoda
- Superfamily: Buccinoidea
- Family: Nassariidae
- Genus: Reticunassa; Iredale, 1936

Type species
- Nassa paupera Gould, 1850

Synonyms
- Hinia (Reticunassa) Iredale, 1936; Nassarius (Reticunassa) Iredale, 1936; Tritia (Reticunassa) Iredale, 1936

= Reticunassa =

Genus of gastropods

Reticunassa is a genus of sea snails, marine gastropod mollusks in the family Nassariidae, the Nassa mud snails or dog whelks.

== Species ==
- Reticunassa annabolteae Galindo, Kool & Dekker, 2017
- Reticunassa aureolineata S.-Q. Zhang, S.-P. Zhang & C.-Y. Lee, 2022
- Reticunassa cockburnensis (Kool & Dekker, 2006)
- Reticunassa compacta (Angas, 1865)
- Reticunassa crenulicostata (Shuto, 1969)
- Reticunassa dermestina (Gould, 1860)
- Reticunassa erythraea (Issel, 1869)
- Reticunassa fratercula (Dunker, 1860)
- Reticunassa fuscofasciata S.-Q. Zhang, S.-P. Zhang & C.-Y. Lee, 2022
- Reticunassa goliath Galindo, Kool & Dekker, 2017
- Reticunassa goudi H. H. Kool, 2022
- Reticunassa hanraveni (Kool & Dekker, 2006)
- Reticunassa hiradoensis (Pilsbry, 1904)
- Reticunassa hugokooli S.-Q. Zhang, S.-P. Zhang & C.-Y. Lee, 2022
- Reticunassa intrudens Galindo, Kool & Dekker, 2017
- Reticunassa jeanmartini (Kool & Dekker, 2006)
- Reticunassa hugokooli S.-Q. Zhang, S.-P. Zhang & C.-Y. Lee, 2022
- Reticunassa luteola (E. A. Smith, 1879)
- Reticunassa microstoma (Pease, 1860)
- Reticunassa microstriata H. H. Kool, 2022
- Reticunassa myanmarensis Kool, 2021
- Reticunassa neoproducta (Kool & Dekker, 2007)
- Reticunassa paupera (Gould, 1850)
- † Reticunassa pertusa (Tate, 1888)
- Reticunassa pilata (Hedley, 1915)
- Reticunassa plebecula (Gould, 1860)
- Reticunassa poppeorum Galindo, Kool & Dekker, 2017
- Reticunassa rotunda (Melvill & Standen, 1896)
- Reticunassa silvardi (Kool & Dekker, 2006)
- Reticunassa simoni (Kool & Dekker, 2007)
- Reticunassa taggartorum (Kuroda, 1960)
- Reticunassa tanager Kool, 2021
- Reticunassa thailandensis Galindo, Kool & Dekker, 2017
- Reticunassa tringa (Souverbie, 1864)
- Reticunassa visayaensis Galindo, Kool & Dekker, 2017
- Reticunassa zanzibarensis (Kool & Dekker, 2007)

Taxon inquirendum

- Reticunassa balteata (Pease, 1869)

Species brought into synonymy

- Reticunassa acutidentata (E. A. Smith, 1879): synonym of Nassarius multigranosus (Dunker, 1847)
- Reticunassa chibi Habe, 1960: synonym of Nassarius chibi (Habe, 1960) (original combination)
- Reticunassa dipsacoides (Hedley, 1907): synonym of Nassarius ephamillus (R. B. Watson, 1882): synonym of Tritia ephamilla (R. B. Watson, 1882)
- Reticunassa festiva (Powys, 1835): synonym of Nassarius festivus (Powys, 1835) (superseded combination)
- Reticunassa flindersi Cotton & Godfrey, 1938: synonym of Nassarius ephamillus (R. B. Watson, 1882): synonym of Tritia ephamilla (R. B. Watson, 1882)
- Reticunassa fratercula (Dunker, 1860): synonym of Nassarius fraterculus (Dunker, 1860)
- Reticunassa fraterculus (Dunker, 1860): synonym of Nassarius fraterculus (Dunker, 1860)
- Reticunassa fuscolineata (E. A. Smith, 1875): synonym of Nassarius fuscolineatus (E. A. Smith, 1875)
- † Reticunassa hongoensis (Itoigawa, 1955): synonym of † Nassarius hongoensis Itoigawa, 1955
- Reticunassa japonica (A. Adams, 1852): synonym of Nassarius japonicus (A. Adams, 1852)
- Reticunassa mobilis (Hedley & May, 1908): synonym of Nassarius mobilis (Hedley & May, 1908)
- Reticunassa praematurata Kuroda & Habe in Habe, 1960: synonym of Nassarius praematuratus (Kuroda & Habe in Habe, 1960)
- † Reticunassa simizui (Otuka, 1934): synonym of † Nassarius simizui Otuka, 1934
- Reticunassa spurca (Gould, 1860): synonym of Nassarius multigranosus (Dunker, 1847)
- † Reticunassa subcopiosa (Ludbrook, 1958): synonym of † Nassarius subcopiosus (Ludbrook, 1958)
- † Reticunassa tatei (Tenison Woods, 1879): synonym of † Nassarius tatei (Tenison Woods, 1879)
- Reticunassa verconis (Cotton & Godfrey, 1932): synonym of Nassarius mobilis (Hedley & May, 1908)
