= Batillaria flectosiphonata =

Scientific classification
- Kingdom: Animalia
- Phylum: Mollusca
- Class: Gastropoda
- Subclass: Caenogastropoda
- Order: incertae sedis
- Family: Batillariidae
- Genus: Batillaria
- Species: B. flectosiphonata

Binomial name
- Batillaria flectosiphonata Ozawa, 1996

Species of gastropod

Batillaria flectosiphonata is a species of sea snail, a marine gastropod mollusk in the family Batillariidae. It is tideland snail endemic to the Nansei Islands, Japan
