= Batillaria sordida =

Scientific classification
- Kingdom: Animalia
- Phylum: Mollusca
- Class: Gastropoda
- Subclass: Caenogastropoda
- Order: incertae sedis
- Family: Batillariidae
- Genus: Batillaria
- Species: B. sordida

Binomial name
- Batillaria sordida Gmelin, 1791

Synonyms
- Strombus tuberculatus Born, 1778; Murex sordidus Gmelin, 1791; Cerithium morus Bruguiere, 1792; Murex varicosus Röding, 1798; Cerithium carbonarium Philippi, 1848; Cerithium tourannense Souleyet, 1852; Cerithium bornii Sowerby, 1855; Batillaria bornii (Sowerby, 1855)

Species of gastropod

Batillaria sordida is a species of sea snail, a marine gastropod mollusc in the family Batillariidae.
