= C6orf163 =

Human gene

Identifiers
- Aliases: C6orf163, chromosome 6 open reading frame 163
- External IDs: MGI: 2684982; GeneCards: C6orf163

Gene location (Human)
Chr.	Chromosome 6 (human)
Band	6q15	Start	87,344,813 bp
Band	6q15	End	87,365,463 bp

Gene location (Mouse)
Chr.	Chromosome 4 (mouse)
Band	4|4 A5	Start	34,743,784 bp
Band	4|4 A5	End	34,756,263 bp
RNA expression pattern
Bgee	Human / Mouse (ortholog); Top expressed in: sperm; gonad; right testis; left testis; testicle; right uterine tube; tendon; Achilles tendon; apex of heart; right ovary / Top expressed in: spermatid; testicle; embryo; spermatocyte; striatum of neuraxis; Cortex of frontal lobe; islet of Langerhans; More reference expression data
BioGPS	n/a
Gene ontology
Molecular function	molecular function
Cellular component	cellular component
Biological process	biological process
Sources:Amigo / QuickGO
Orthologs
Databases	NCBI: entry; OMA: entry
Species	Human	Mouse
Entrez	206412	214568
Ensembl	ENSG00000203872	ENSMUSG00000071015
UniProt	Q5TEZ5	Q3V037
RefSeq (mRNA)	NM_001010868	NM_001033255
RefSeq (protein)	NP_001010868	NP_001028427
Location (UCSC)	Chr 6: 87.34 – 87.37 Mb	Chr 4: 34.74 – 34.76 Mb
PubMed search
- Wikidata
View/Edit Human	View/Edit Mouse

C6orf163 is a human protein encoded by the C6orf163 gene.

== Gene ==
C6orf163 and nearby genes on chromosome 6.

C6orf163 is a 20.6 kb gene encoded on the plus strand of chromosome 6 (6q15). C6orf163 is predicted to be part of a readthrough locus with its neighboring genes on the plus strand, SMIM8 (small integral membrane protein 8, also known as C6orf162), LINC01590 (long intergenic non-coding RNA 1590), and CFAP206 (cilia and flagella associated protein 206).

== Transcript ==
C6orf163 has been observed to be near-ubiquitously expressed at low levels in RNA-seq datasets. It is expressed most highly in the testes. There are 4 isoforms of C6orf163, the most common of which has 5 exons. The splice variants differ by truncation on the 5' end. An additional unspliced mRNA variant has been identified, but it does not appear to code for a protein.

Throughout early development, C6orf163 is expressed at moderate levels in many tissues. Its expression is highest at 10 weeks gestational time and decreases as development progresses.

== Protein ==
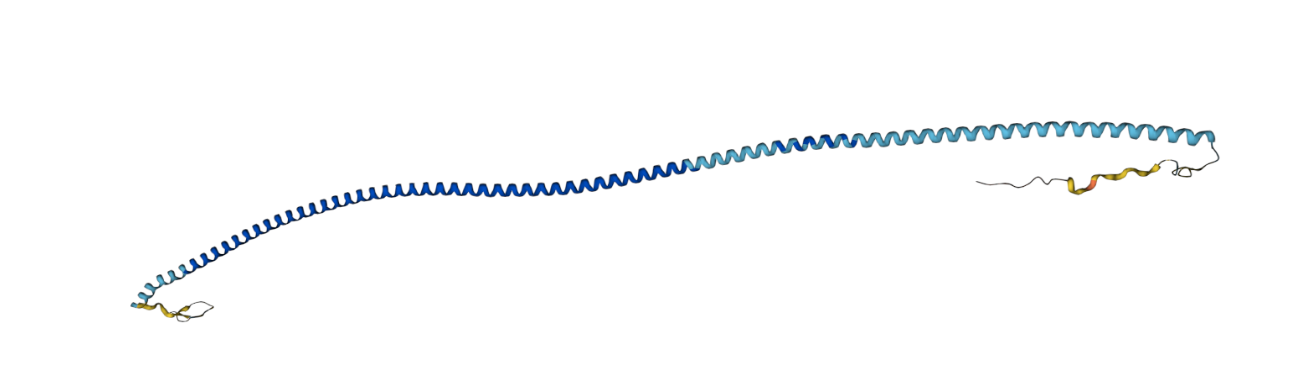
Predicted structure of human c6orf163 from Alphafold

The human C6orf163 protein is 329 amino acids long and has a molecular weight of 38 kDa. Its predicted isoelectric point is 6.49. According to the structural prediction from Alphafold, it mainly consists of a long alpha helical region, which is a relatively rare structure in human proteins. The long alpha helical structure is well conserved among orthologs.

C6orf163 contains a predicted leucine zipper motif from amino acids 247 to 269. This motif is typically involved in DNA binding, and is commonly found in transcription factors and other regulatory proteins. Leucine zippers form dimers to bind DNA, so the presence of this motif suggests that C6orf163 may exist as a dimer.

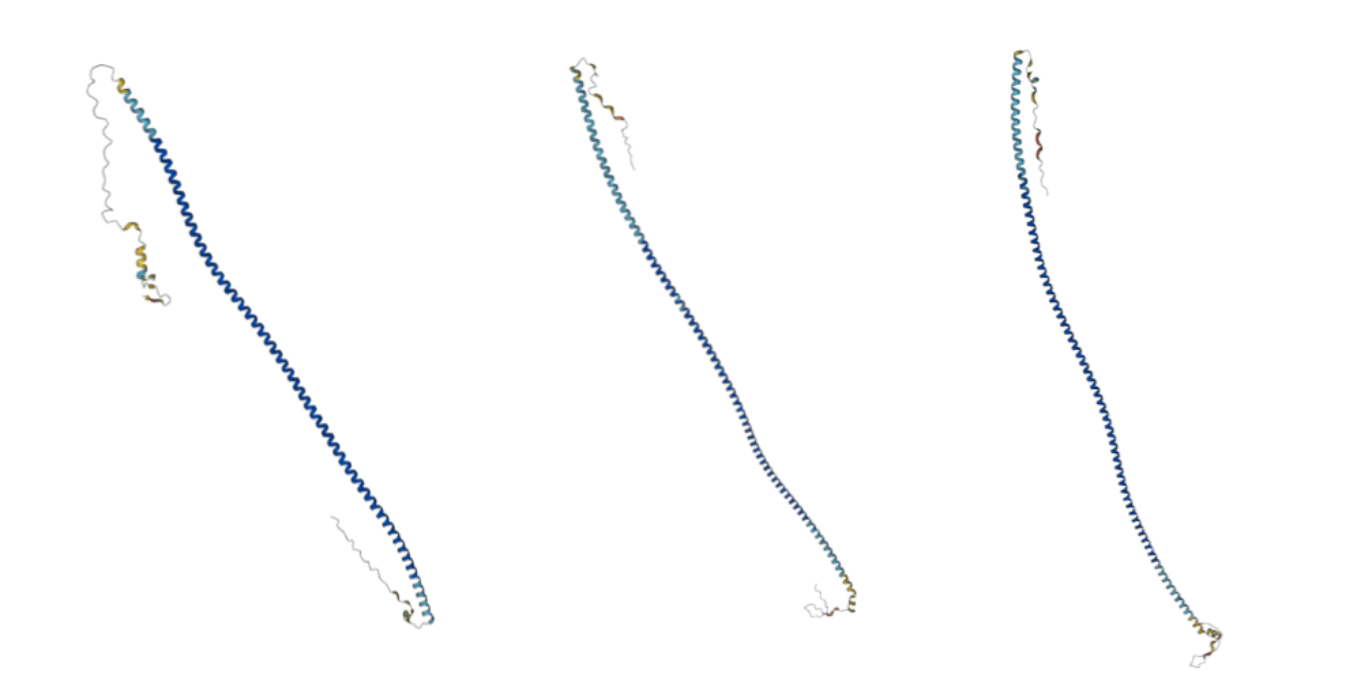
Alphafold structure predictions for selected orthologs show structural conservation. From left to right: Pseudonaja textilis (Eastern brown snake), Zalophus californianus (California sealion), and Egretta garzetta (Little egret).

C6orf163 has been experimentally found to undergo phosphorylation at 7 different residues and ubiquitination at 1 residue. Additionally, it has been computationally predicted to undergo sumoylation, lycine acetylation, and mucin-type O-GlcNac glycosylation.

C6orf163 has been found to interact with the protein DRC6 (Dynein regulatory complex subunit 6, also known as F-box and leucine rich repeat protein 13), which is a ubiquitin ligase that forms part of the SCF-type E3 ubiquitin ligase complex. DRC6 has been found to be involved in regulation of ciliary and flagellar motility.

C6orf163 has a nuclear localization signal from amino acids 310 to 316. Antibody staining has shown C6orf163 to be localized to the nucleus and cytoplasm.

== Evolution ==
Conceptual translation of C6orf163 showing locations of notable motifs and conserved residues.

The C6orf163 protein is highly conserved among animals. Orthologs of C6orf163 have been identified in mammals, birds, reptiles, amphibians, fish, and some invertebrates including mollusks, echinoderms, and lancelets. The most distant c6orf163 ortholog identified is in the Japanese mud snail, Batillaria attramentaria. This ortholog has 23% sequence identity with the human protein.

Homo sapiens C6orf163 has no known paralogs in humans.

Selected C6orf163 orthologs
Genus and species	Common name	Accession number	Length (aa)	Sequence identity (%)	Date of divergence (MYA)
Homo sapiens	human	NP_001010868.2	328	100	0
Mus musculus	mouse	NP_001028427.1	328	74	87
Egretta garzetta	little egret	XP_009647262.2	330	47	319
Crocodylus porosus	saltwater crocodile	XP_019393256.1	350	43	319
Geotrypetes seraphini	gaboon caecilian	XP_033792248.1	313	33	353
Scyliorhinus canicula	small-spotted catshark	XP_038654713.1	330	27	464
Branchiostoma floridae	Florida lancelet	XP_035665671.1	297	29	556
Batillaria attramentaria	Japanese mud snail	KAG5690851.1	278	23	680

== Clinical significance ==
A genome-wide association study analyzing genetic predictors of long-term treatment outcome for bipolar disorder showed that SNPs near C6orf163 were associated with the total number of manic and depressive episodes during follow up treatment and the number of depressive episodes during follow up, suggesting that C6orf163 may be involved in susceptibility to bipolar disorder.
