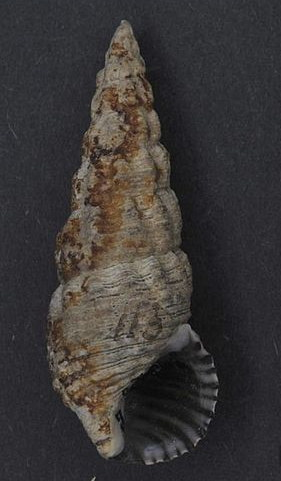
- Shell of Batillaria australis (museum specimen)

Scientific classification
- Kingdom: Animalia
- Phylum: Mollusca
- Class: Gastropoda
- Subclass: Caenogastropoda
- Order: incertae sedis
- Family: Batillariidae
- Genus: Batillaria
- Species: B. australis

Binomial name
- Batillaria australis (Quoy & Gaimard, 1834)

Synonyms
- Cerithidea alternata Hutton, 1873; Cerithium alternatum Hutton, 1873 (synonym & homonym); Cerithium australe Quoy & Gaimard, 1834 (original combination); Velacumantus australis (Quoy & Gaimard, 1834)

= Batillaria australis =

Species of gastropod

Batillaria australis, the Australian mud whelk, is a species of sea snail, a marine gastropod mollusk in the family Batillariidae.

The species occurs along the coasts of Australia.
