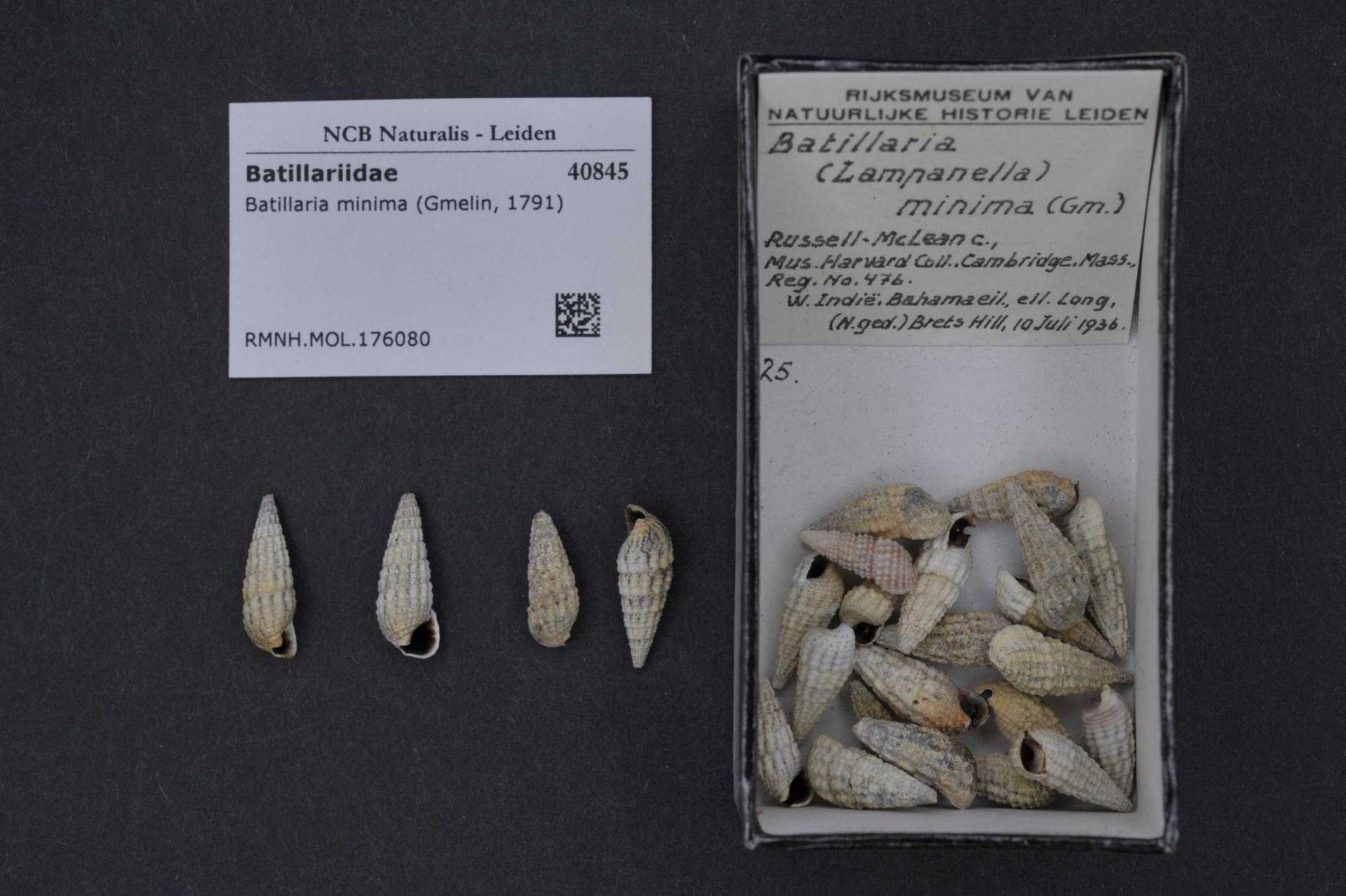
- Lampanella minima

Scientific classification
- Kingdom: Animalia
- Phylum: Mollusca
- Class: Gastropoda
- Subclass: Caenogastropoda
- Order: incertae sedis
- Family: Batillariidae
- Genus: Lampanella; Mörch, 1876

Type species
- Murex minimus Gmelin, 1791

= Lampanella =

Genus of gastropods

Lampanella is a genus of sea snails, marine gastropod mollusks in the family Batillariidae.

== Species ==
Species within the genus Lampanella include:

- Lampanella minima (Gmelin, 1791)

Synonyms:

- Lampanella eriensis Mörch, 1876 is a synonym of Pyrazus (Lampanella) eriensis (Mörch, 1876)
