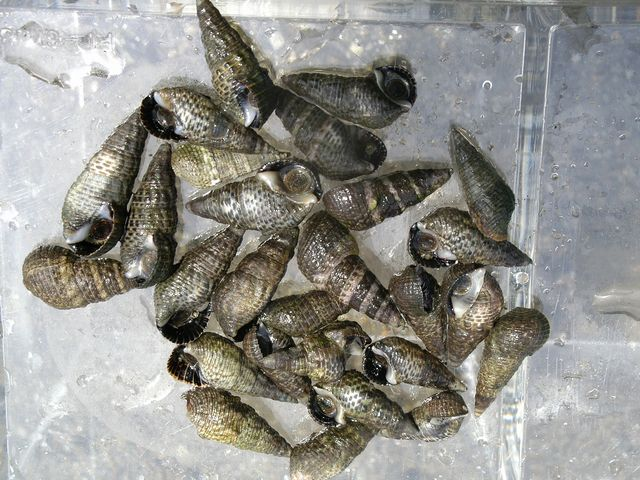

Scientific classification
- Kingdom: Animalia
- Phylum: Mollusca
- Class: Gastropoda
- Subclass: Caenogastropoda
- Order: incertae sedis
- Family: Batillariidae
- Genus: Batillaria
- Species: B. multiformis

Binomial name
- Batillaria multiformis (Lischke, 1869)

= Batillaria multiformis =

Species of gastropod

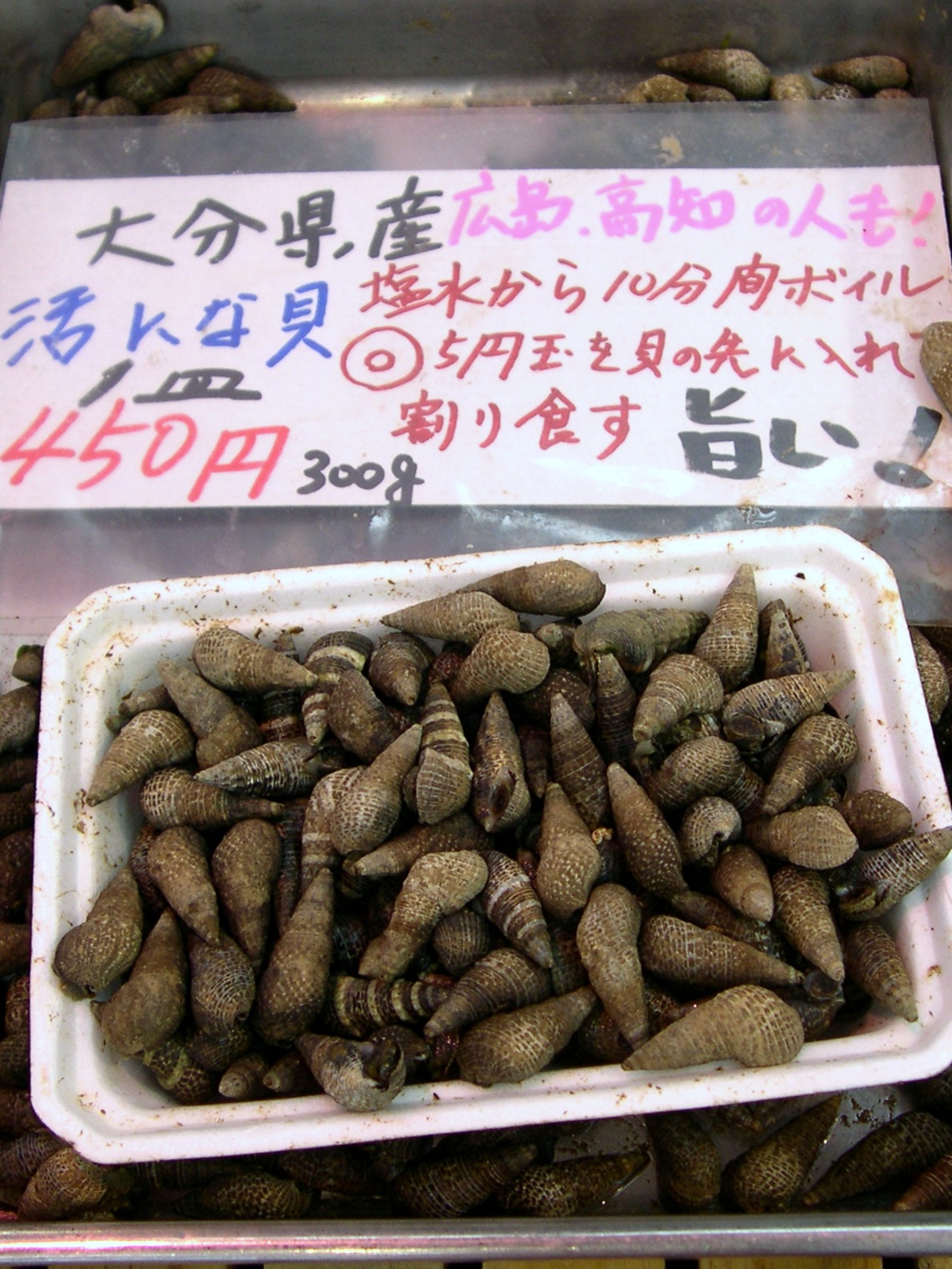
Batillaria multiformis for sale

Batillaria multiformis is a species of sea snail, a marine gastropod mollusk in the family Batillariidae. They are colloquially known as salt marsh or mudflat snails, due to their benthic nature in intertidal zones and salt marshes. They are endemic to the West Pacific Ocean, but are most commonly observed on the southern coast of Japan. B. multiformis feed on phytoplankton in their larval stage, and various terrestrial and aquatic primary producers once in their benthic adult form. They are intermediate hosts to several Cercaria trematodes. While still highly prevalent in remaining mudflat regions, available suitable habitat has declined with increasing land reclamation in Japan. Since 2020, B. multiformis has been considered a "near-threatened" species by the Japanese Ministry of the Environment.

== Taxonomy ==
Batillaria multiformis was first recorded in 1869 by Lishke in Japan, and was initially classified Lampania multiformis. This genus is synonymous with genus Batillaria, determined by W.H. Benson in 1842. It is a gastropod within the subclass Caenogastropoda, which contains other sea snails, freshwater snails and land snails.

Molecular phylogeny analysis suggests that Batillaria multiformis is most closely related to species Batillaria flectosiphona within the genus, with both being derived from the basal species Batillaria zonalis. Recent mitochondrial DNA analysis suggests that shell morphology is not always an accurate measure of identifying genetically different species.

== Morphology ==
The shell of Batillaria multiformis has a dark brown to grey base coloration with varying patterns and an overall knobbed appearance, with between eight and nine flat whorls. The upper whorls have pronounced ribs, and roughly five spiral-shaped striae. Whorls lower to the body have roughly 15 spiral striae. The sutures between the whorls are impressed (indented). The outer lip of the opening of the shell is straight, with a smooth columella and a short siphonal canal. The operculum is brown and horny. The shell morphology is visually similar to B. attramentaria, which has led to developments in PCR-RFLP techniques, requiring the use of two restriction enzymes to determine the species at a genotype level. However, the two can be differentiated by their life history, as they exhibit notably different developmental styles.

In Southern Japan, average shell size of fully grown individuals appears to fall within the range of 25 to 40 mm. However, in a survey of individuals residing in Mutsu Bay in the northernmost part of Japan, shell length reached almost 50 mm. Shell growth stops when sexual maturity is reached, at which time a callus knob is formed at the top of the aperture. When sexually mature, the digestive gland is covered by the gonad.

=== Shell color and pattern variability ===
Color and pattern has been observed to be variable in the shell of B. multiformis. There are two main color patterns: a dark, unbanded shell, and shells with white banding on the upper side of each whorl. These two patterns are also expressed in B. attramentaria. The unbanded, darker shell is more prominent in the northern coast of Japan that borders the Pacific Ocean, and is the only type of pattern found on the west coast of Japan. The white-accented shell becomes more prominent in populations on the southern coast bordering the Pacific Ocean. It may be that the darkest shells are favored in the northern parts of Japan because it allows for greater levels of UV absorption, acting as an adaptation to survive in colder weather. Areas with higher average minimum temperatures experience greater shell color diversity. Shell coloration and patterns do not have an observable effect on the predation of or parasitism in B. multiformis.

== Life history ==
=== Feeding ===
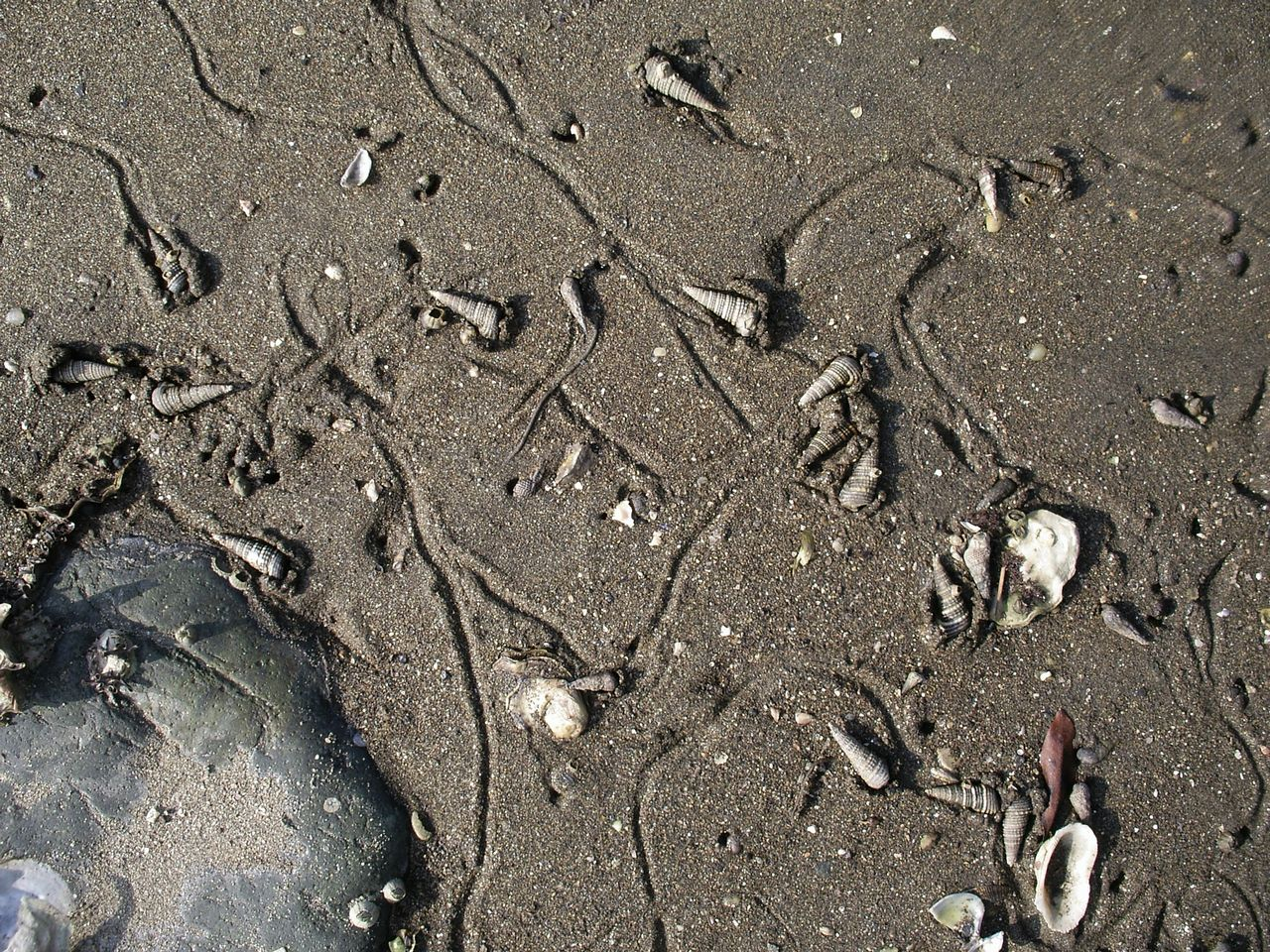
Movement of B. multiformis on sandy sediment. Taken by Hentari0806.

In their veliger form, B. multiformis feed on small suspended phytoplankton. In their adult form, individuals are benthic deposit feeders, and consume benthic diatoms on the sediment surface, alongside microalgae, seaweeds, and phytoplankton. They may also consume seagrass and saltmarsh plants if available. B. multiformis may have the ability to filter feed on phytoplankton during high tide; Batillaria zonalis have been confirmed to filter feed by creating a suction force to filter water past a cord made of mucus that captures digestible particles, and B. multiformis has exhibited similar behaviors.

=== Reproduction and development ===
Reproduction has not been observed between individuals of B. multiformis, but they are believed to be gonochoric. Spawning occurs in the autumn months. Individuals captured and observed in tanks laid egg capsules containing five to nine embryos each; the egg capsules are connected and laid in a string-like fashion.

B. multiformis is unique for its planktonic development system. Where both B. attramentaria and B. cumingi hatch as benthic juveniles, B. multiformis experiences a planktonic larval stage prior to adulthood. These planktonic larval stages hatch roughly three days after egg capsules are laid. They are capable of swimming, but observations show that they mostly lie unmoving. This drifting stage may benefit the species by preventing inbreeding and settling new populations. However, It has been hypothesized that this may contribute to the declining populations of B. multiformis; rather than growing as benthic juveniles on their parental tidal flats, they may drift to new locations, but habitable locations are both isolated and decreasing in number.

Growth rates are variable depending on location and temperature; warmer temperatures correspond to a faster growth rate. In northernmost populations, shell growth stops from September to April, and resumes in July and August at peak temperatures. Sexual maturity is reached at 4-10 years after the juvenile stage.

=== Predation and parasitism ===
Predation of B. multiformis has not been formally observed or studied. Many small intertidal gastropods are typically preyed upon by local birds, fish and crabs. However, a survey conducted of shore bird fecal matter did not reveal any remains of Batillaria shells, leaving predation ultimately hypothetical.

Batillaria multiformis are used as intermediate hosts for three different species of trematodes. The general morphospecies Cercaria batillariae also infects other members of the genus (Batillaria attramentaria and Batillaria cumingi) and is not host-specific to B. multiformis. However, PCR-RFLP analysis of C. batillariae infections in both of these species suggests there may be a genetically distinct version of C. batillariae that specifically targets Batillaria multiformis. These trematodes are castrating and alter behavior; snails begin to grow after previously halting growth at maturation, move lower in the intertidal zone, and change feeding habits. These parasites can infect 50% to 90% of Batillaria snails.

== Distribution and habitat ==
Batillaria multiformis is endemic to the West Pacific Ocean, with observations on the shores of Hong Kong, South Korea, the Philippines, and Japan. Their distribution in Japan excludes Hokkaido, but extends as far north as the Mutsu Bay and as far south as the shores of Nagashima Island and the tidal flats of inner Kagoshima Bay. Their primary suitable habitat is the southern and southeast coasts of Japan. They reside in the brackish waters of intertidal flats, salt marshes, estuaries, and bays, and may be found among reeds and mangroves.

In comparison to B. cumingi, which shares a tidal flat with B. multiformis, B. multiformis spends more time out of the water at low tide, and prefers to reside in higher intertidal levels. They prefer to settle on sandy mud and sand.

=== Tokyo Bay ===
Tokyo is situated on the northwest side of the Tokyo Bay. the intertidal flats of Tokyo Bay were prominent habitats for B. multiformis in the mid-20th century, but population numbers have been steadily declining, with distribution becoming restricted to the eastern portion of the Tokyo Bay. This is attributed to the increased reclamation of land containing intertidal flats around the Tokyo Bay, limiting the amount of suitable habitat and isolating the remaining flats from one another. The bottom water is also highly hypoxic, limiting survivorship in the drifting planktonic larvae stage. The Tokyo Metropolitan Government has designated B. multiformis as "a species requiring protection". There have been no sightings of B. multiformis in Tokyo since 1977.

In the intertidal flats bordering the Edogawa Drainage Canal (EDC) of the Tokyo Bay, high numbers of B. multiformis individuals were found in samples taken between 1985 and 1993, but were completely absent in samples taken from 2007 and 2012, leading specialists to conclude that the population was extirpated. B. multiformis specimens were observed again in the EDC in 2020, but the reason for the reappearance is unknown.
