= Zeacumantus diemenensis =

Scientific classification
- Kingdom: Animalia
- Phylum: Mollusca
- Class: Gastropoda
- Subclass: Caenogastropoda
- Order: incertae sedis
- Family: Batillariidae
- Genus: Zeacumantus
- Species: Z. diemenensis

Binomial name
- Zeacumantus diemenensis (Quoy & Gaimard, 1834)

Species of gastropod

Zeacumantus diemenensis is a species of sea snail, a marine gastropod mollusk in the family Batillariidae.
