= Batillaria mutata =

Conservation status
- Data Deficient (IUCN 2.3)

Scientific classification
- Kingdom: Animalia
- Phylum: Mollusca
- Class: Gastropoda
- Subclass: Caenogastropoda
- Order: incertae sedis
- Family: Batillariidae
- Genus: Batillaria
- Species: B. mutata

Binomial name
- Batillaria mutata (Pilsbry & Vanatta, 1902)

Species of mollusc

Batillaria mutata is a species of small mudflat saltwater snail, a marine gastropod mollusk in the family Batillariidae, the horn snails.

== Distribution ==
This species is endemic to Ecuador.
