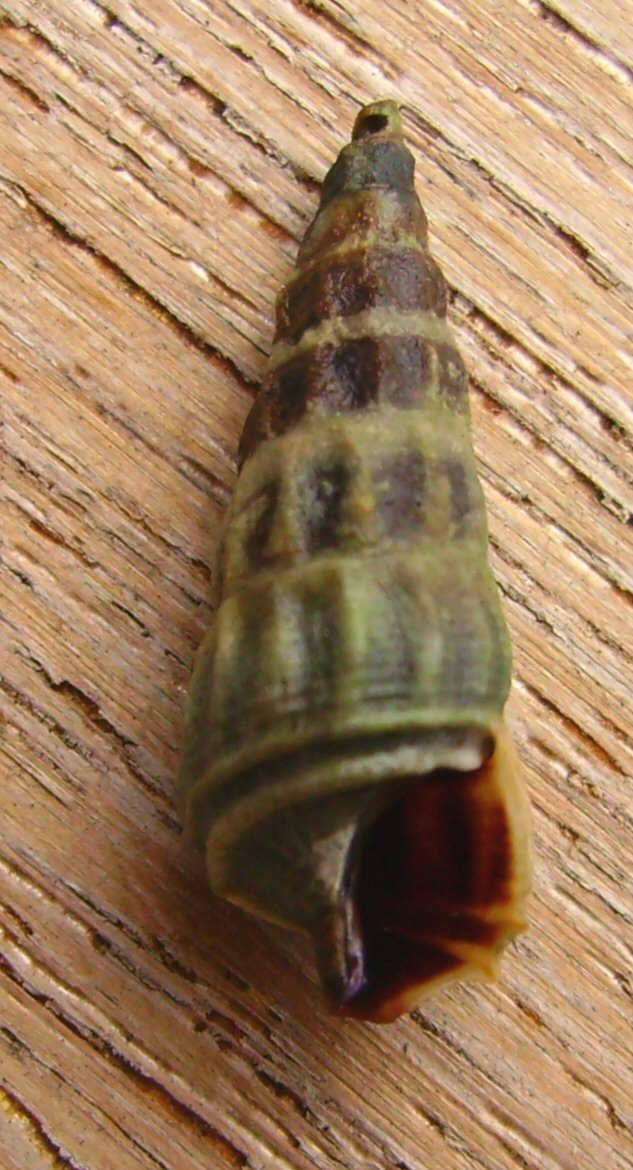
- Apertural view of a shell of Zeacumantus lutulentus

Scientific classification
- Kingdom: Animalia
- Phylum: Mollusca
- Class: Gastropoda
- Subclass: Caenogastropoda
- Order: incertae sedis
- Family: Batillariidae
- Genus: Zeacumantus
- Species: Z. lutulentus

Binomial name
- Zeacumantus lutulentus (Kiener, 1841)

Synonyms
- † Ataxocerithium perplexum Marshall & Murdoch, 1919; Cerithium bicarinatum Gray, 1843 (Invalid: junior primary homonym of Cerithium bicarinatum Lamarck, 1804); Cerithium lutulentum Kiener, 1842 (basionym)

= Zeacumantus lutulentus =

Species of gastropod

Zeacumantus lutulentus, commonly known as hornshell, is a species of medium-sized sea snail or mud snail, a marine gastropod mollusk in the family Potamididae, the horn snails.

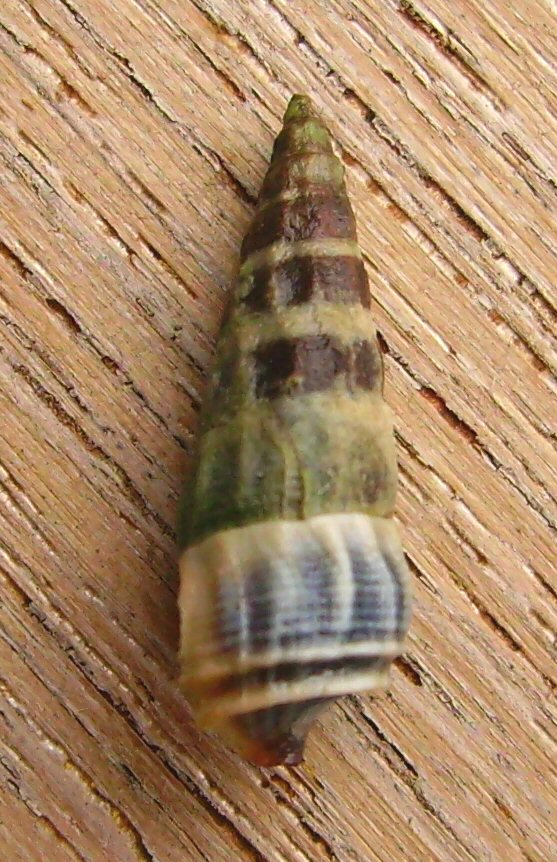
Dorsal view of a shell of Zeacumantus lutulentus

== Distribution ==
This species occurs in:

- New Zealand
- Australia
