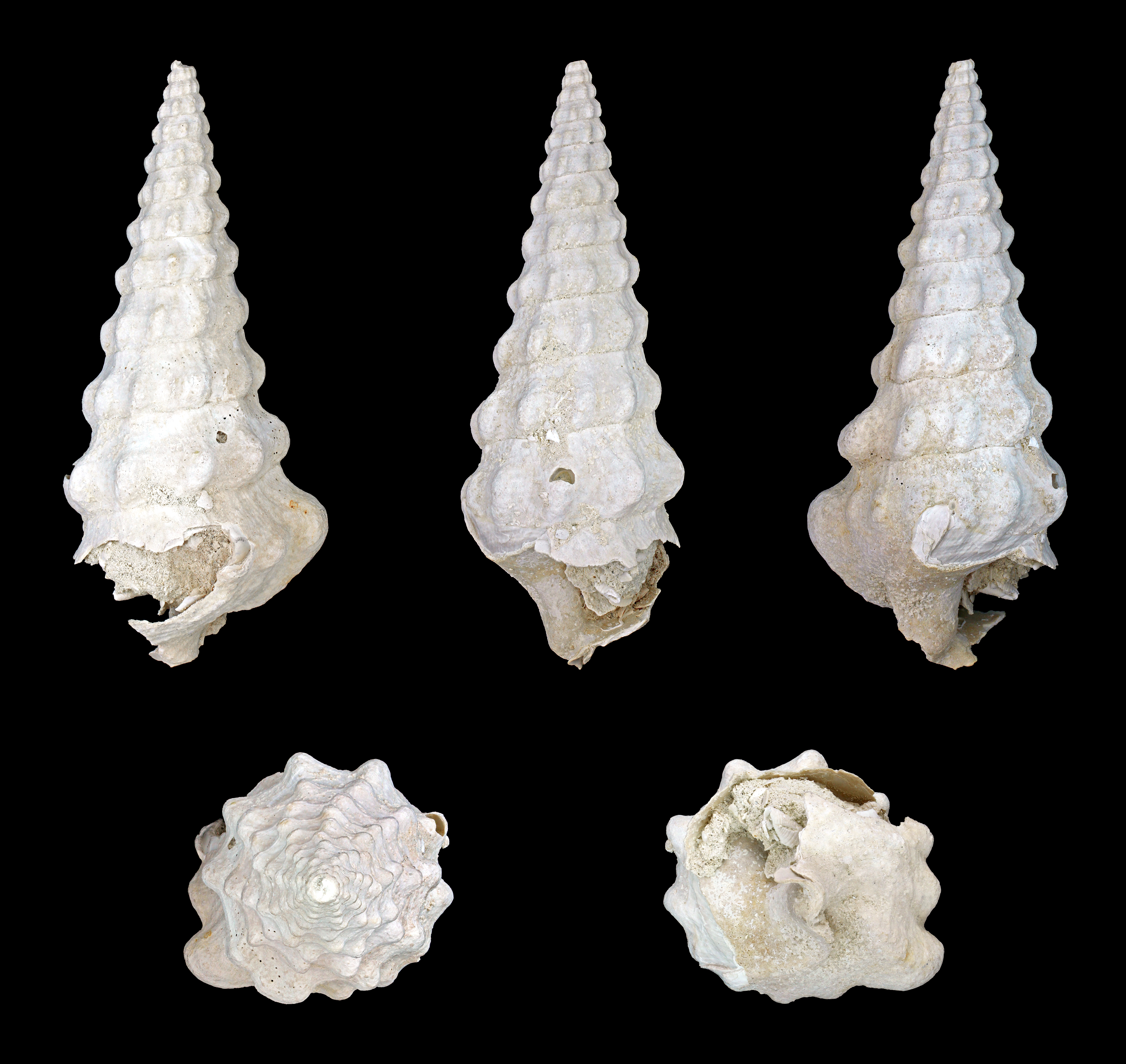
- Pyrazus scalatus from the Pliocene of Florida

Scientific classification
- Kingdom: Animalia
- Phylum: Mollusca
- Class: Gastropoda
- Subclass: Caenogastropoda
- Order: incertae sedis
- Family: Batillariidae
- Genus: Pyrazus; Montfort, 1810

= Pyrazus =

Pyrazus Temporal range: Eocene–Recent

Genus of gastropods

Pyrazus is a genus of sea snails, marine gastropod mollusks in the family Batillariidae. Pyriazidae is a synonym of Batillariidae and Pyrazus is the type genus of the Pyriazidae.

== Species ==
Species within the genus Pyrazus include:

- Pyrazus eriensis (Mörch, 1876)
- Pyrazus ebeninus (Bruguière, 1792)
- † Pyrazus pentagonatus (Schlotheim, 1820) - from Eocene of Hungary
