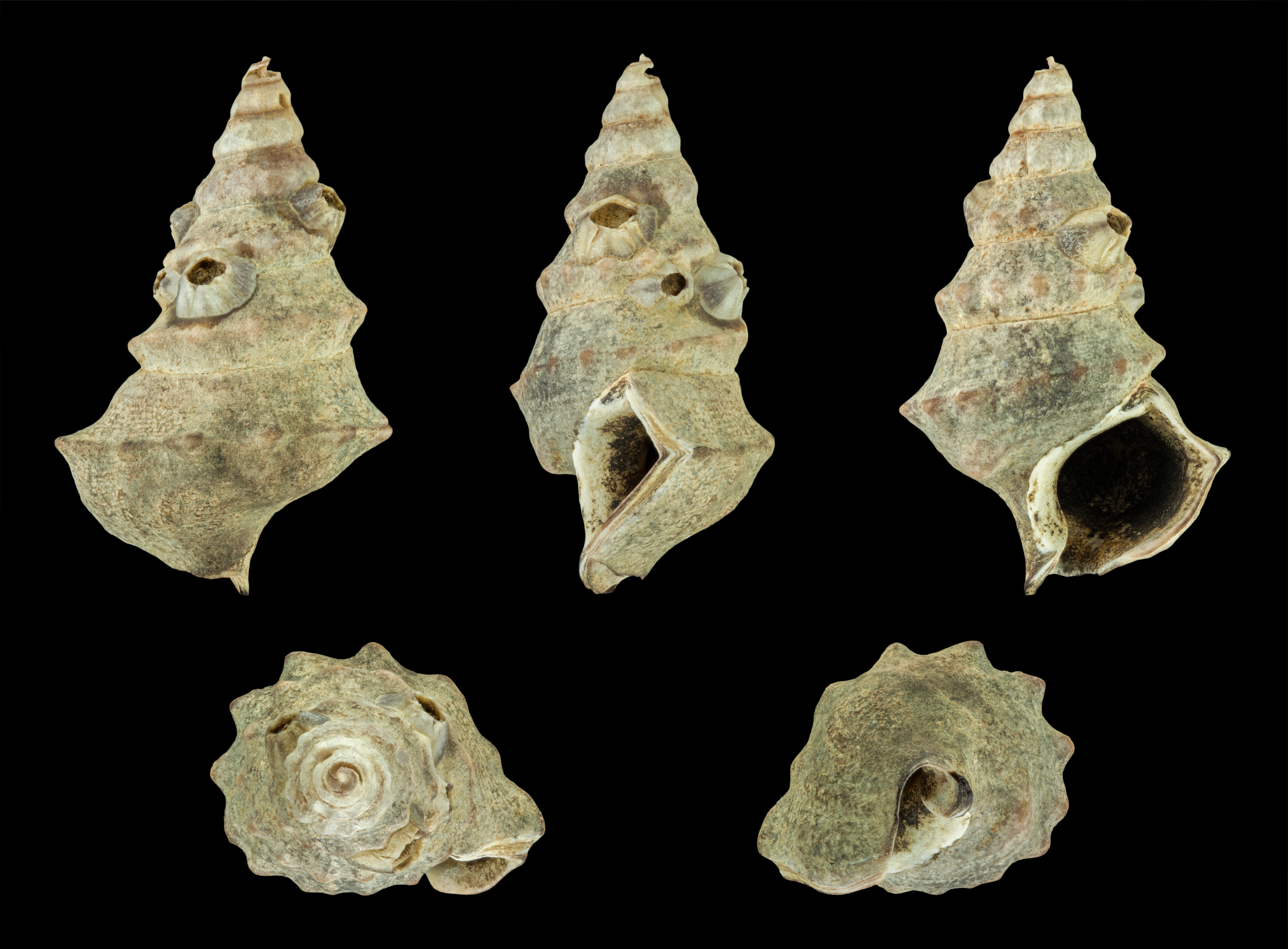

Scientific classification
- Kingdom: Animalia
- Phylum: Mollusca
- Class: Gastropoda
- Subclass: Caenogastropoda
- Order: incertae sedis
- Family: Batillariidae
- Genus: Rhinocoryne
- Species: R. humboltdi

Binomial name
- Rhinocoryne humboltdi (Valenciennes, 1832)

= Rhinocoryne humboltdi =

Species of gastropod

Rhinocoryne humboltdi is a species of sea snail, a marine gastropod mollusk in the family Batillariidae.
