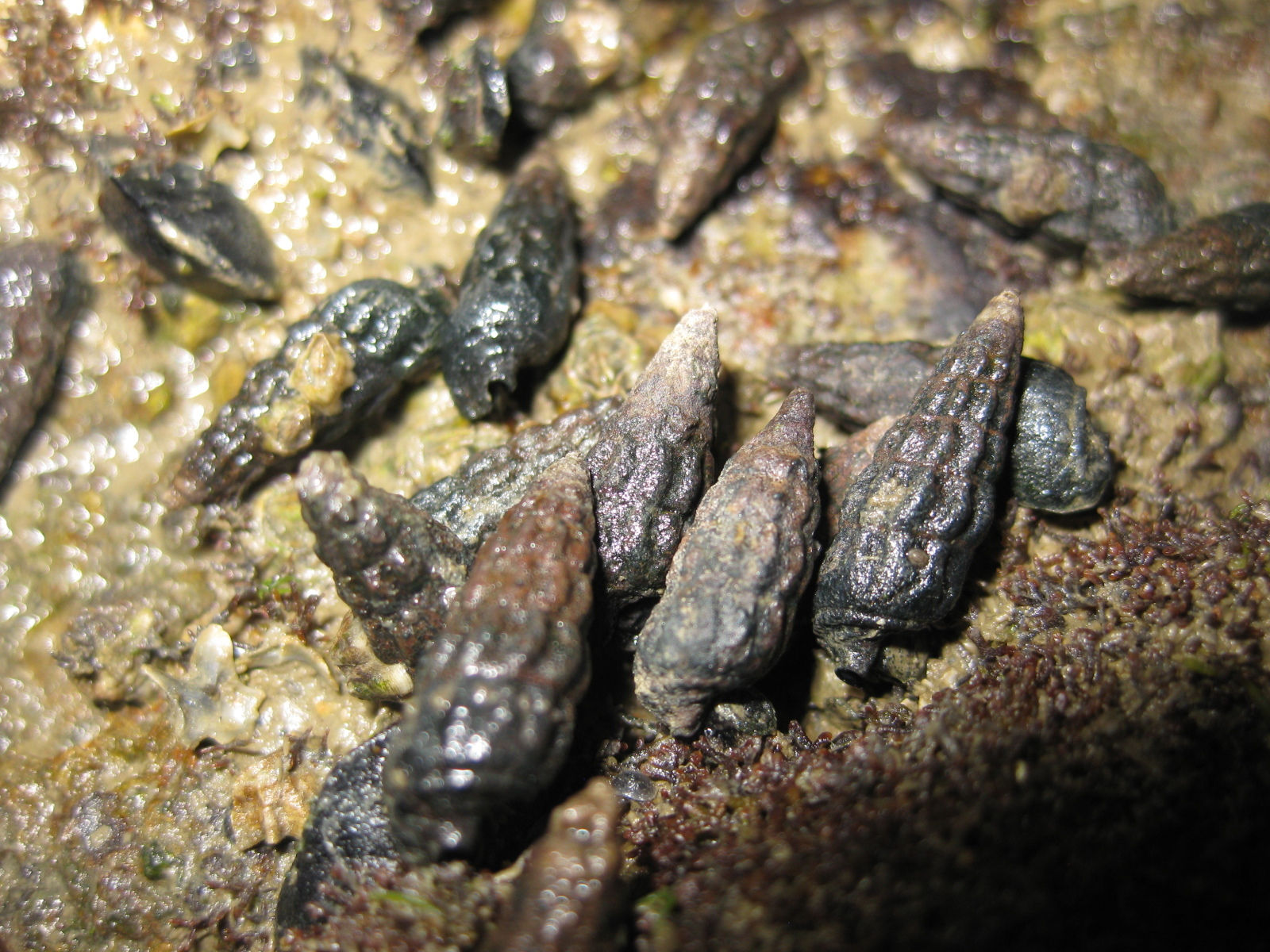

Scientific classification
- Kingdom: Animalia
- Phylum: Mollusca
- Class: Gastropoda
- Subclass: Caenogastropoda
- Order: incertae sedis
- Family: Batillariidae
- Genus: Zeacumantus
- Species: Z. subcarinatus

Binomial name
- Zeacumantus subcarinatus (Sowerby II, 1855)

Synonyms
- Cerithidea tricarinata Hutton, 1883; Cerithium subcarinatum G.B. Sowerby II, 1855 (basionym)

= Zeacumantus subcarinatus =

Species of gastropod

Zeacumantus subcarinatus, common name the southern creeper, is a species of small sea snail or mud snail, a marine gastropod mollusc in the family Batillariidae.

== Distribution ==
This species is found on the coasts of New Zealand and Australia (New South Wales).

== Description ==
The size of an adult shell varies between 8 mm and 16 mm.
