= Reticunassa jeanmartini =

Scientific classification
- Kingdom: Animalia
- Phylum: Mollusca
- Class: Gastropoda
- Subclass: Caenogastropoda
- Order: Neogastropoda
- Family: Nassariidae
- Genus: Reticunassa
- Species: R. jeanmartini

Binomial name
- Reticunassa jeanmartini Kool & Dekker, 2006

Synonyms
- Nassarius jeanmartini Kool & Dekker, 2006 (original combination)

Species of gastropod

Reticunassa jeanmartini is a species of sea snail, a marine gastropod mollusk in the family Nassariidae, the Nassa mud snails or dog whelks.

== Description ==
The length of the shell varies between 5 mm and 8 mm.

== Distribution ==
This species occurs in the Indian Ocean off Mauritius and La Réunion.
