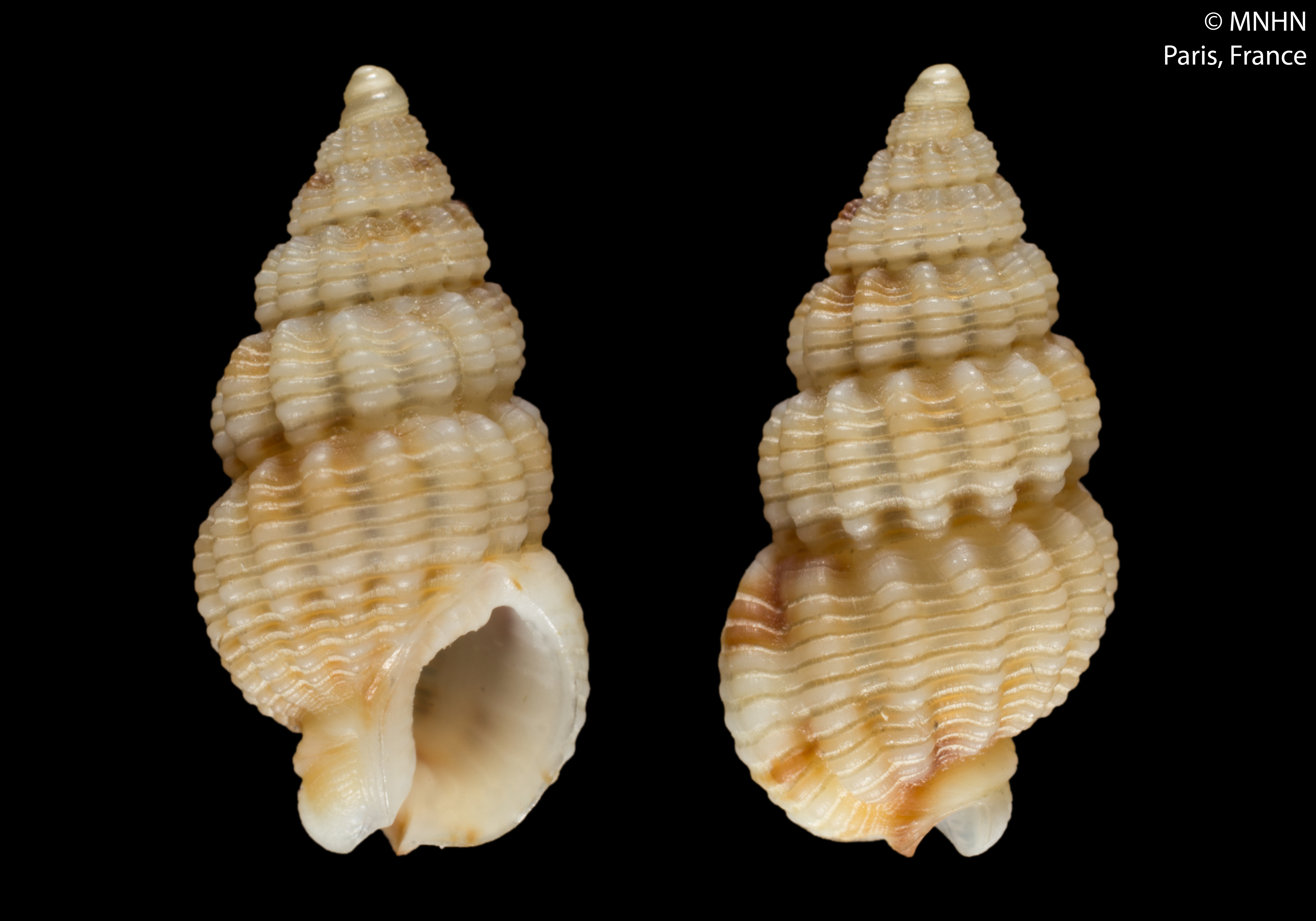
- Shell of Reticunassa silvardi (holotype at MNHN, Paris)

Scientific classification
- Kingdom: Animalia
- Phylum: Mollusca
- Class: Gastropoda
- Subclass: Caenogastropoda
- Order: Neogastropoda
- Family: Nassariidae
- Genus: Reticunassa
- Species: R. silvardi

Binomial name
- Reticunassa silvardi (Kool & Dekker, 2006)

Synonyms
- Nassarius silvardi Kool & Dekker, 2006 (original combination); Nassarius (Alectrion) waikikius Dall, W.H. MS, 1922

= Reticunassa silvardi =

Species of gastropod

Nassarius silvardi is a species of sea snail, a marine gastropod mollusc in the family Nassariidae, the nassa mud snails or dog whelks.

== Description ==
The length of the shell varies between 4 mm and 7.5 mm.

== Distribution ==
This marine species occurs of Indonesia and Hawaii.
