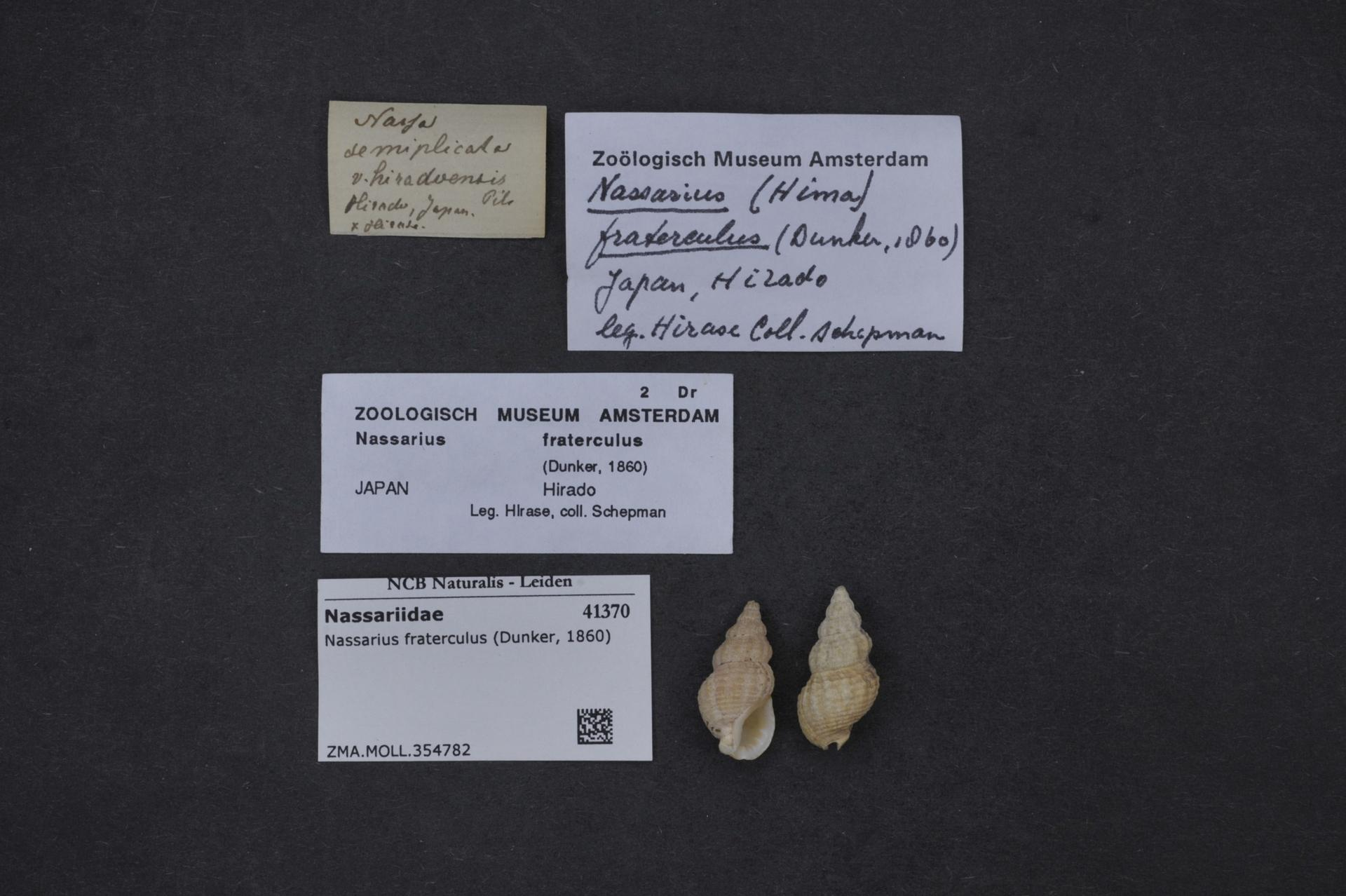
- Nassarius fraterculus shells

Scientific classification
- Kingdom: Animalia
- Phylum: Mollusca
- Class: Gastropoda
- Subclass: Caenogastropoda
- Order: Neogastropoda
- Family: Nassariidae
- Genus: Nassarius
- Species: N. fraterculus

Binomial name
- Nassarius fraterculus (Dunker, 1860)

Synonyms
- Hima fraterculus (Dunker, 1860); Nassa (Hima) fraterculus Dunker, 1860; Nassa fraterculus Dunker, 1860; Nassa hypolia Pilsbry, 1895; Nassa nodosa Marrat, 1880; Nassa semiplicata A. Adams, 1853; Nassa semiplicata hiradoensis Pilsbry, 1904; Nassa semiplicata hizenensis Pilsbry, 1904; Nassarius (Hima) fraterculus (Dunker, 1860); Nassarius (Tritonella) fraterculus (Dunker, 1860); Nassarius (Tritonella) fraterculus hiradoensis (Pilsbry, 1904); Nassarius (Tritonella) semiplicatus (A. Adams, 1853); Nassarius (Tritonella) semiplicatus hizenensis (Pilsbry, 1904); Reticunassa fratercula (Dunker, 1860); Reticunassa fratercula hiradoensis (Pilsbry, 1904); Reticunassa fraterculus (Dunker, 1860); Reticunassa fraterculus hypolius (Pilsbry, 1895); Tritia (Reticunassa) hiradoensis (Pilsbry, 1904); Tritia fratercula (Dunker, 1860)

= Nassarius fraterculus =

Species of gastropod

Nassarius fraterculus is a species of sea snail, a marine gastropod mollusk in the family Nassariidae, the Nassa mud snails or dog whelks. The shell grows to a length of 10 mm. This marine species occurs off China, Korea and Japan, but has been introduced to the Pacific Northwest of North America through commercial oyster shipments.

== Habitat ==
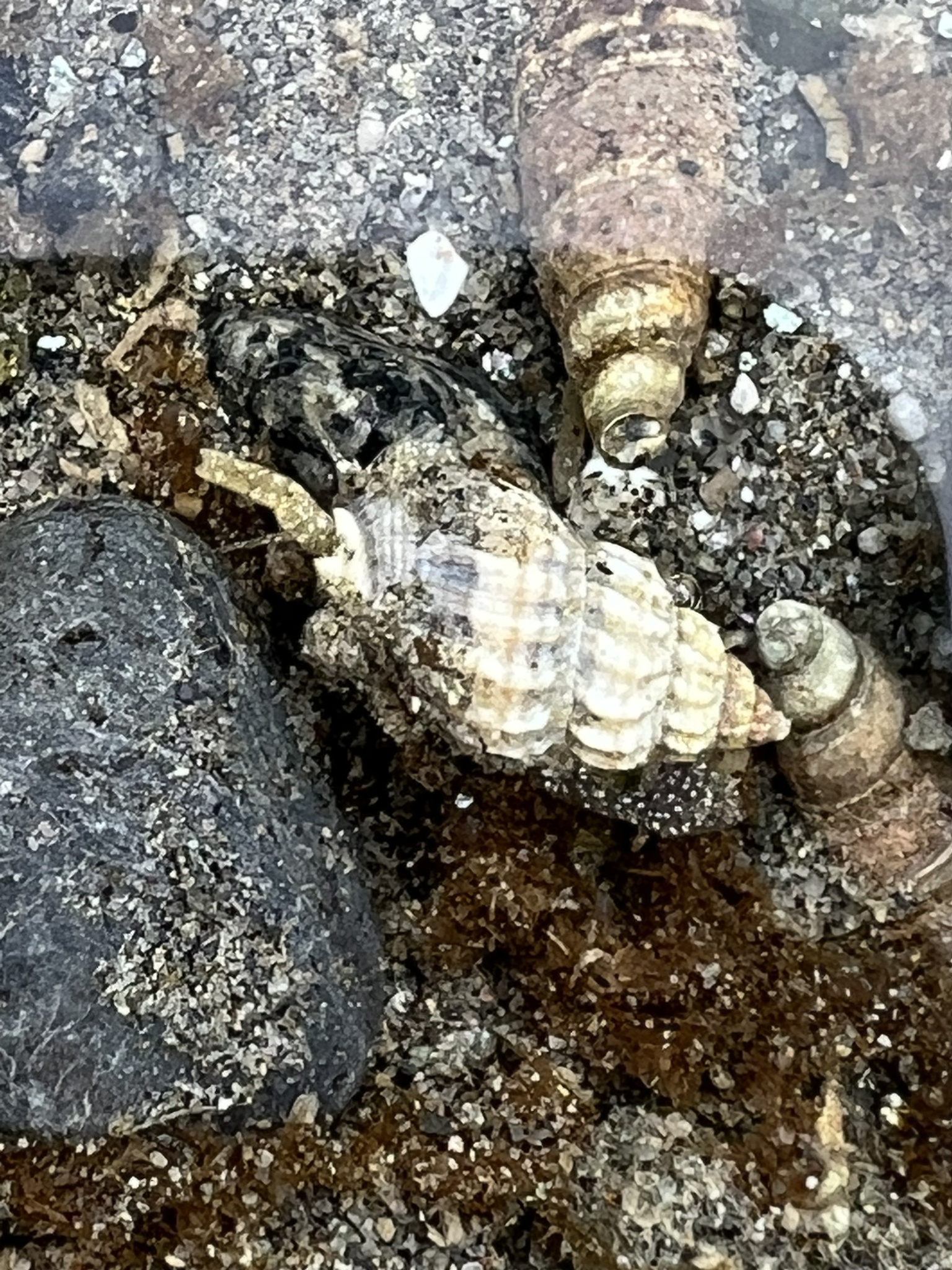
Nassarius fraterculus shell

N. fraterculus inhabits intertidal regions, foraging on crushed mussels.

== Relationship to other invasive species ==
In the Pacific Northwest, N. fraterculus has been shown to benefit from the presence of Batillaria attramentaria, another invasive species.
