= Reticunassa erythraea =

Scientific classification
- Kingdom: Animalia
- Phylum: Mollusca
- Class: Gastropoda
- Subclass: Caenogastropoda
- Order: Neogastropoda
- Family: Nassariidae
- Genus: Reticunassa
- Species: R. erythraea

Binomial name
- Reticunassa erythraea (Issel, 1869)

Synonyms
- Hinia erythrea (Issel, 1869); Nassa (Hima) erythrea Issel, 1869; Nassa costulata var. erythrea Issel, 1869 (original combination); Nassa erythraea Issel, 1869; Nassarius erythraeus (Issel, 1869); Tritia erythraea (Issel, 1869)

Species of gastropod

Reticunassa erythraea is a species of sea snail, a marine gastropod mollusk in the family Nassariidae, the Nassa mud snails or dog whelks.

== Description ==
The shell size varies between 4.5 mm and 9 mm

== Distribution ==
This species occurs in the Red Sea and in the Indian Ocean off Madagascar.
