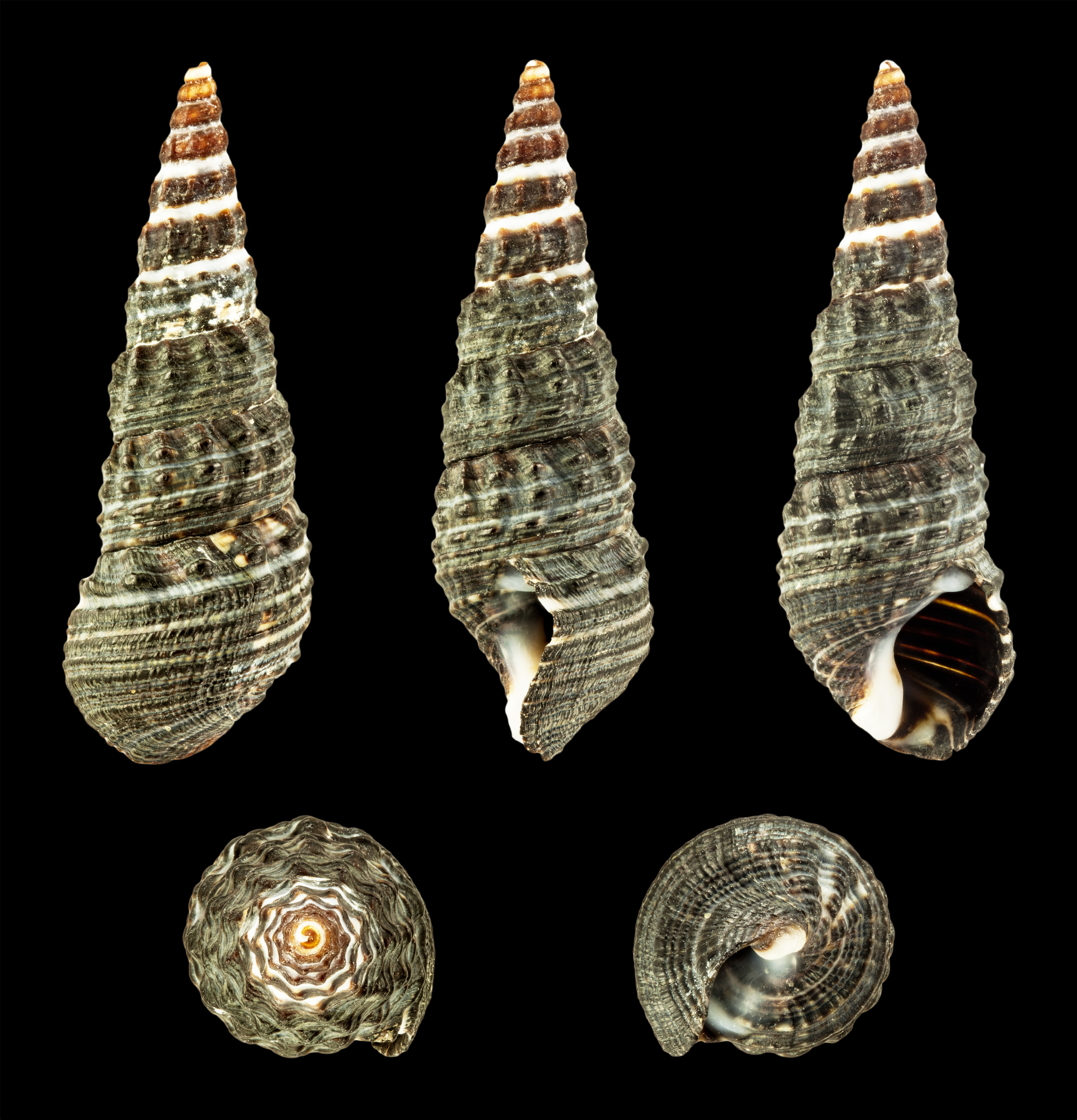

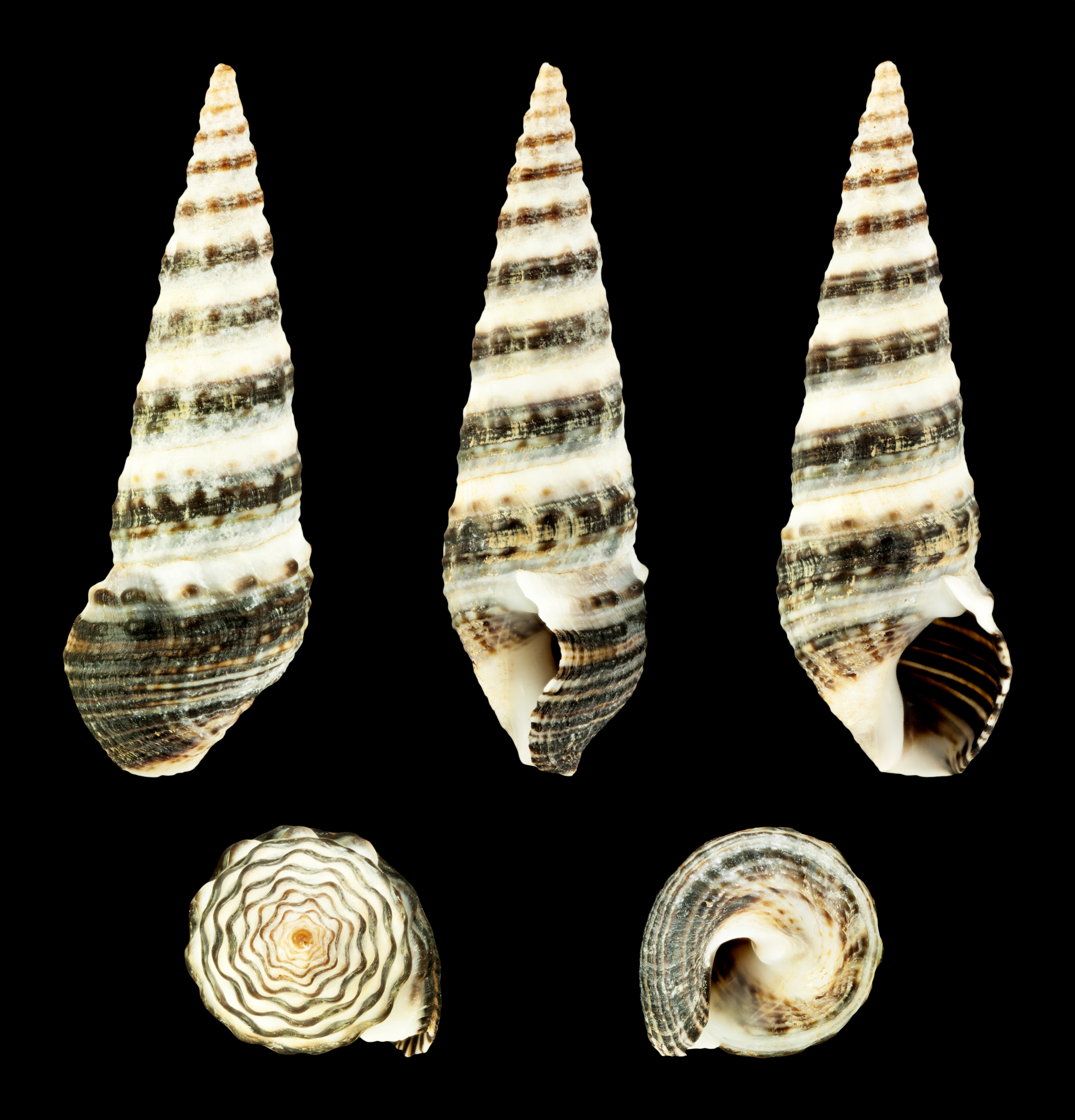

Scientific classification
- Kingdom: Animalia
- Phylum: Mollusca
- Class: Gastropoda
- Subclass: Caenogastropoda
- Order: incertae sedis
- Family: Batillariidae
- Genus: Batillaria
- Species: B. zonalis

Binomial name
- Batillaria zonalis (Bruguière, 1792)

Synonyms
- Cerithium zonale Bruguière, 1792; Lampania aterrima Dunker, 1877

= Batillaria zonalis =

Species of gastropod

Batillaria zonalis is a species of small sandy shore snail, a marine gastropod mollusk in the family Batillariidae, the horn snails.

== Distribution ==
- Japan

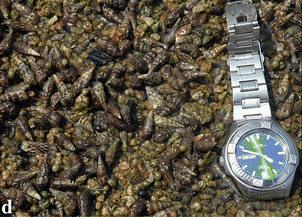
Aggregation of Batillaria zonalis and Clithon oualaniense in situ.
