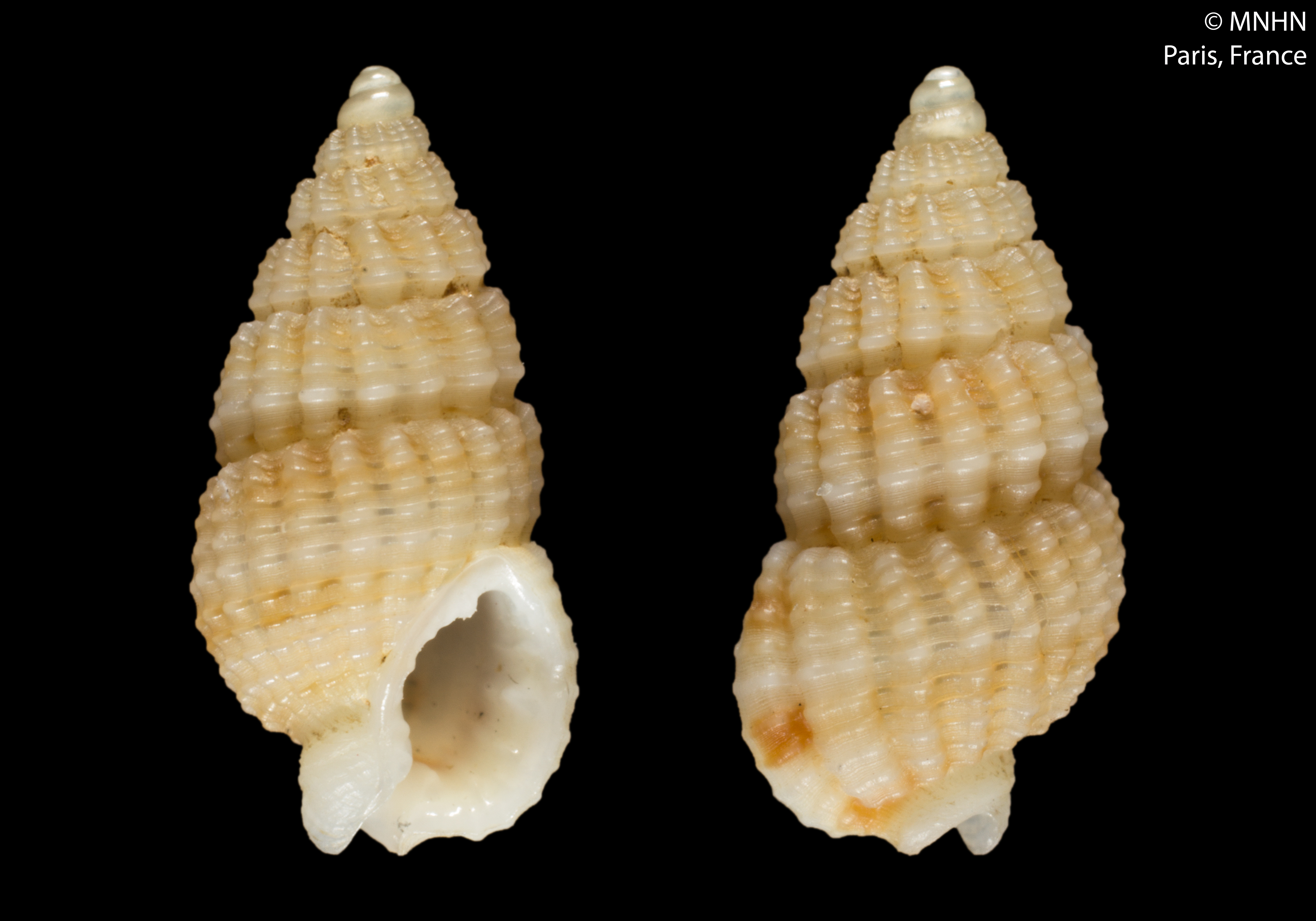
- Shell of Reticunassa simoni (holotype at MNHN, paris)

Scientific classification
- Kingdom: Animalia
- Phylum: Mollusca
- Class: Gastropoda
- Subclass: Caenogastropoda
- Order: Neogastropoda
- Superfamily: Buccinoidea
- Family: Nassariidae
- Genus: Reticunassa
- Species: R. simoni

Binomial name
- Reticunassa simoni (Kool & Dekker, 2007)

Synonyms
- Nassarius simoni Kool & Dekker, 2007 (original combination)

= Reticunassa simoni =

Species of gastropod

Nassarius simoni is a species of sea snail, a marine gastropod mollusc in the family Nassariidae, the nassa mud snails or dog whelks.

== Description ==
The length of the shell attains 6.8 mm.

== Distribution ==
This marine species occurs off Madagascar.
