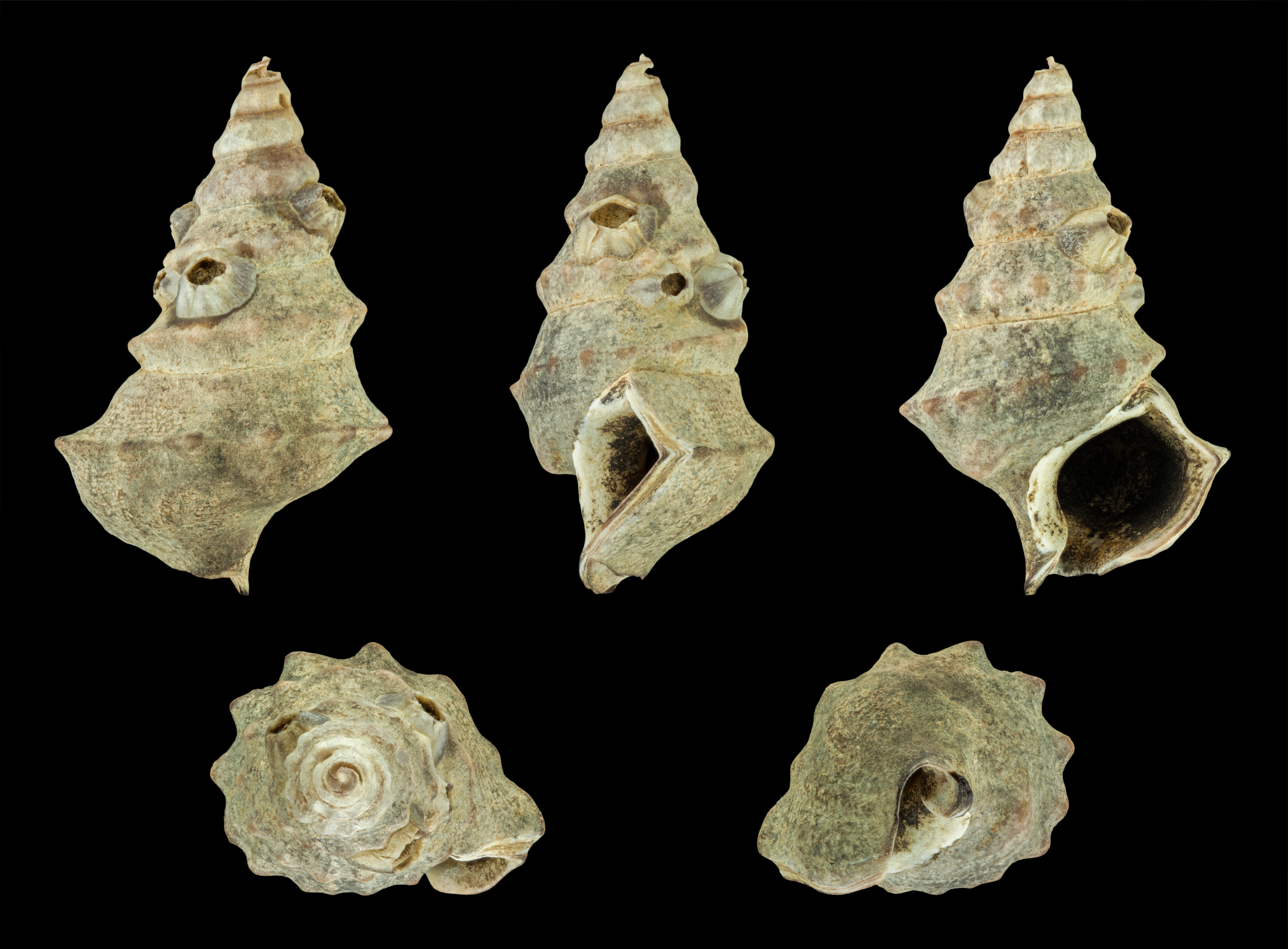
- Rhinocoryne humboldti

Scientific classification
- Kingdom: Animalia
- Phylum: Mollusca
- Class: Gastropoda
- Subclass: Caenogastropoda
- Order: incertae sedis
- Family: Batillariidae
- Genus: Rhinocoryne; Martens, 1900

= Rhinocoryne =

Genus of gastropods

Rhinocoryne is a genus of sea snails, marine gastropod mollusks in the family Batillariidae.

== Species ==
Species within the genus Rhinocoryne include:

- Rhinocoryne humboltdi (Valenciennes, 1832)
