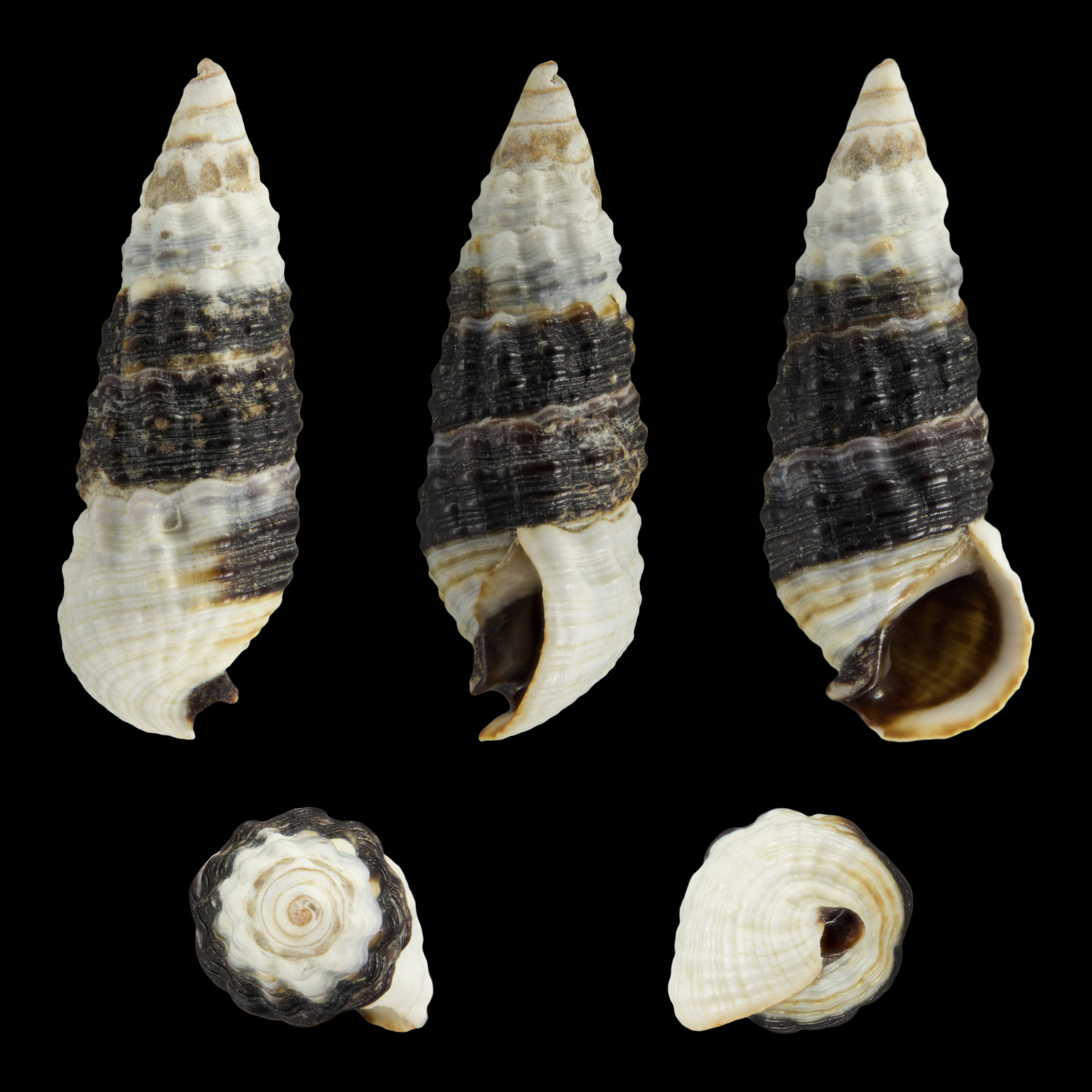

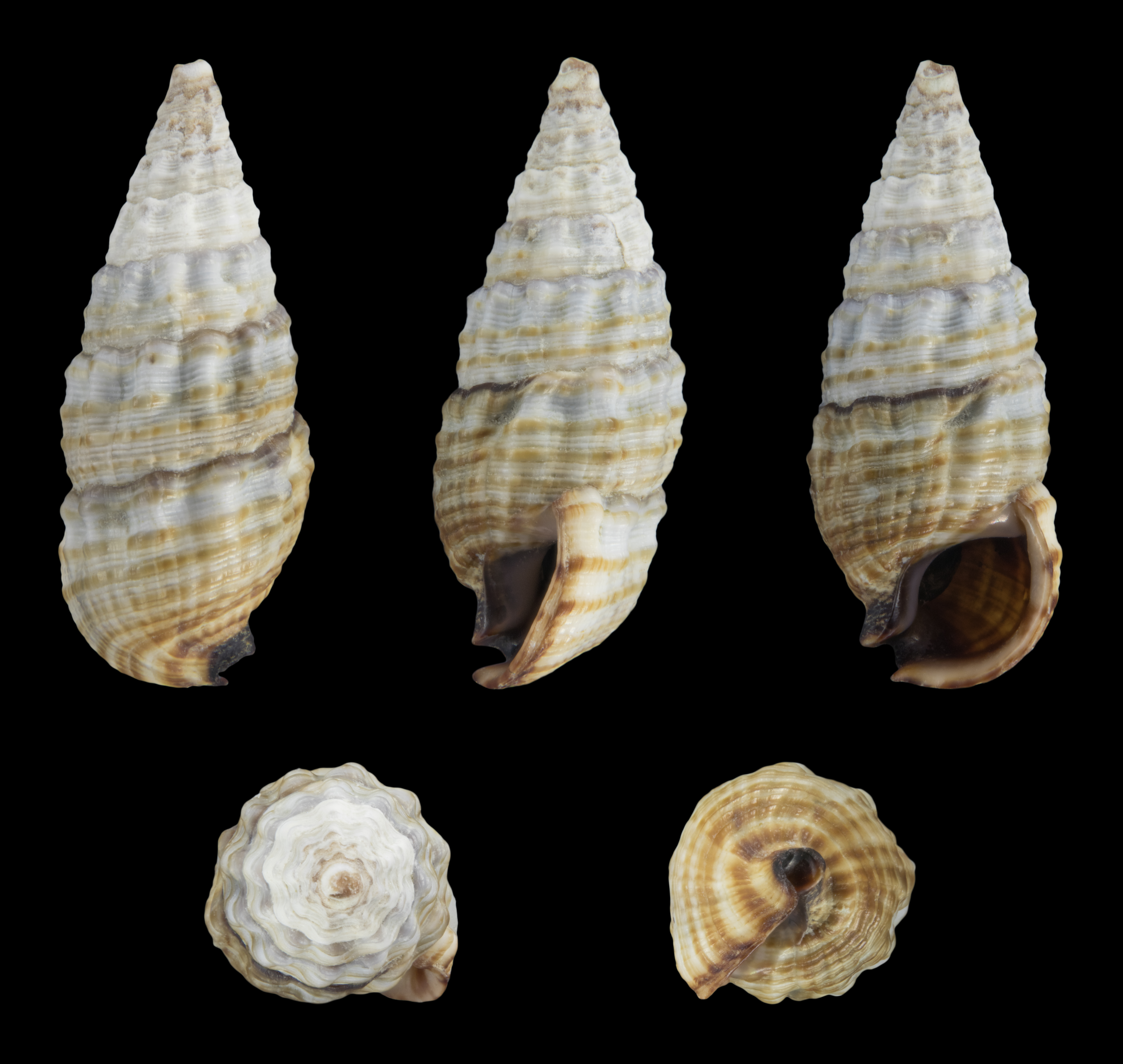

Scientific classification
- Kingdom: Animalia
- Phylum: Mollusca
- Class: Gastropoda
- Subclass: Caenogastropoda
- Order: incertae sedis
- Family: Batillariidae
- Genus: Lampanella
- Species: L. minima

Binomial name
- Lampanella minima (Gmelin, 1791)

Synonyms
- Batillaria minima (Gmelin, 1791)

= Lampanella minima =

Species of gastropod

Lampanella minima is a species of sea snail, a marine gastropod mollusk in the family Batillariidae.
