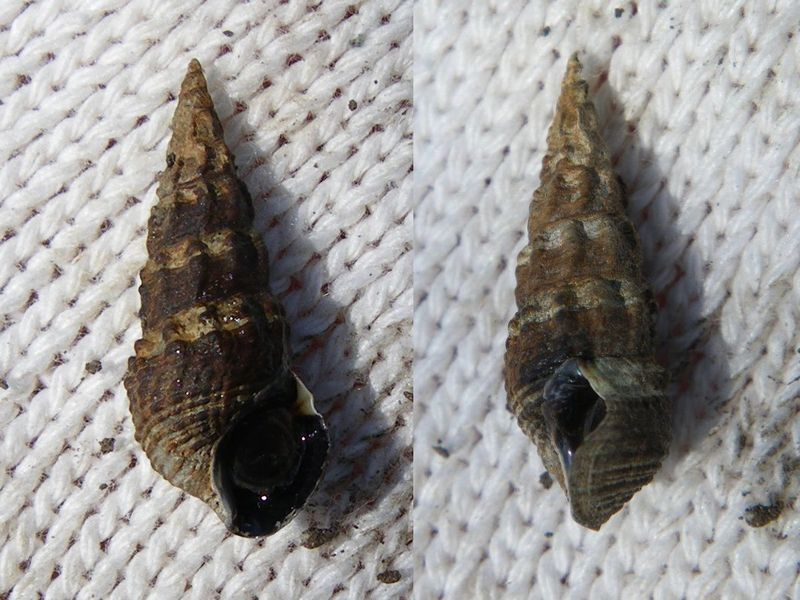
- Batillaria zonalis

Scientific classification
- Kingdom: Animalia
- Phylum: Mollusca
- Class: Gastropoda
- Subclass: Caenogastropoda
- Order: incertae sedis
- Family: Batillariidae
- Genus: Batillaria; Benson, 1842

Type species
- Cerithium zonale Bruguière, 1792

Synonyms
- Lampania Gray, 1847

= Batillaria =

Genus of gastropods

Batillaria is a genus of small salt marsh or mudflat snails, marine gastropod mollusks in the family Batillariidae, the horn snails.

== Species ==
Species within the genus Batillaria include:

- Batillaria attramentaria (G. B. Sowerby I, 1855) - Japanese false cerith
- Batillaria australis (Quoy & Gaimard, 1834)
- Batillaria bornii (Sowerby II, 1887 in 1842–87)
- Batillaria estuarina (Tate, 1893)
- Batillaria flectosiphonata Ozawa, 1996
- Batillaria multiformis (Lischke, 1869)
- Batillaria mutata (Pilsbry & Vanatta, 1902)
- Batillaria sordida Gmelin, 1791
- Batillaria zonalis (Bruguière, 1792) - Japanese false cerith, synonyms: Batillaria aterrima, Batillaria atramenfaria, Batillaria cumingi and also (cotroversely with above) Batillaria multiformis

Synonyms:

- Batillaria minima (Gmelin, 1791) - West Indian false cerith, is a synonym of Lampanella minima (Gmelin, 1791)
