= Reticunassa zanzibarensis =

Scientific classification
- Kingdom: Animalia
- Phylum: Mollusca
- Class: Gastropoda
- Subclass: Caenogastropoda
- Order: Neogastropoda
- Superfamily: Buccinoidea
- Family: Nassariidae
- Genus: Reticunassa
- Species: R. zanzibarensis

Binomial name
- Reticunassa zanzibarensis (Kool & Dekker, 2007)

Synonyms
- Nassarius zanzibarensis Kool & Dekker, 2007 (original combination)

Species of gastropod

Nassarius zanzibarensis is a species of sea snail, a marine gastropod mollusc in the family Nassariidae, the Nassa mud snails or dog whelks.

== Description ==
The length of the shell varies between 5.5 mm and 11.5 mm.

== Distribution ==
This marine species occurs from Mozambique to Pakistan.
