= Reticunassa cockburnensis =

Scientific classification
- Kingdom: Animalia
- Phylum: Mollusca
- Class: Gastropoda
- Subclass: Caenogastropoda
- Order: Neogastropoda
- Superfamily: Buccinoidea
- Family: Nassariidae
- Genus: Reticunassa
- Species: R. cockburnensis

Binomial name
- Reticunassa cockburnensis (Kool & Dekker, 2006)

Synonyms
- Nassarius cockburnensis Kool & Dekker, 2006 (original combination)

Species of gastropod

Reticunassa cockburnensis is a species of sea snail, a marine gastropod mollusk in the family Nassariidae, the Nassa mud snails or dog whelks.

== Description ==
The length of the shell varies between 6.9 mm and 9.7 mm.

== Distribution ==
This marine species occurs off Western Australia.
