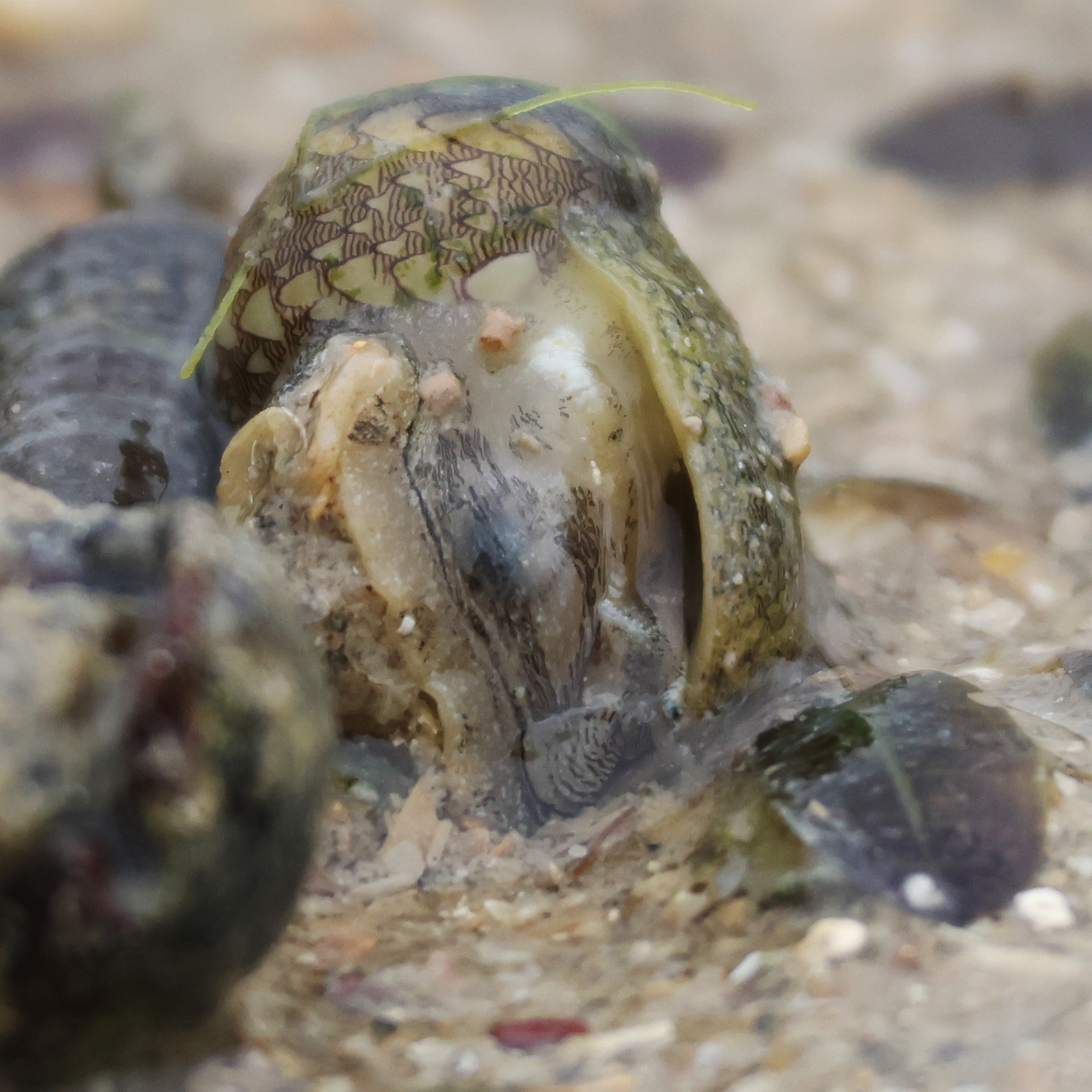
- Live Clithon oualaniense in situ
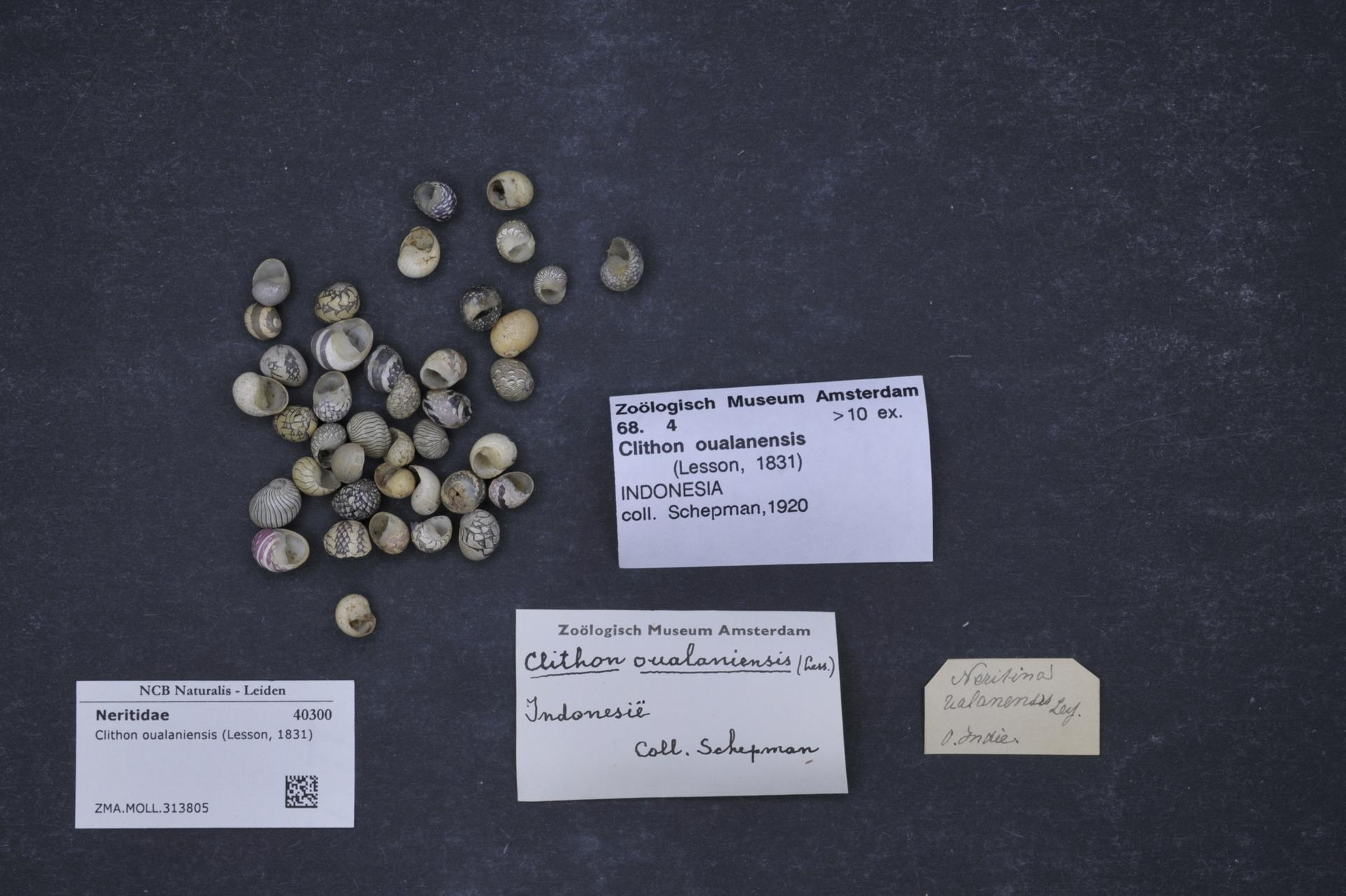
- Clithon oualaniense shells

Conservation status
- Least Concern (IUCN 3.1)

Scientific classification
- Domain: Eukaryota
- Kingdom: Animalia
- Phylum: Mollusca
- Class: Gastropoda
- Subclass: Neritimorpha
- Order: Cycloneritida
- Family: Neritidae
- Genus: Clithon
- Species: C. oualaniense

Binomial name
- Clithon oualaniense (Lesson, 1831)

Synonyms
- Neritina oualaniensis Lesson, 1831; Clithon oualaniensis [sic] (incorrect gender ending); Theodoxus oualaniense (Lesson, 1831); Pictoneritina oualaniensis (Lesson, 1831)

= Clithon oualaniense =

Species of gastropod

Clithon oualaniense is a species of brackish water snail with an operculum, a nerite. It is an aquatic gastropod mollusk in the family Neritidae, the nerites.

== Distribution ==
This species occurs in Indo-Pacific region: Nansei-shoto in Japan, Hong Kong, Thailand, Peninsular Malaysia, Singapore, Jawa in Indonesia, Philippines, Papua New Guinea, Queensland in Australia India and Ceylon. It also occurs in American Samoa, Cook Islands, Fiji, French Polynesia, Guam, New Caledonia, Samoa, Solomon Islands and Vanuatu.

== Description ==
The coloration pattern on the shell is very variable.

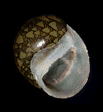
Clithon oualaniense shell

== Ecology ==
Clithon oualaniense is a eurybiotic species. It inhabits soft bottoms of intertidal habitats. It can occur in high density, for example 347 snails per m² was recorded, that correspond to the biomass of 30.6 g per m². It also inhabits sea grass bed with Zostera japonica. The activity of Clithon oualaniense is diurnal; snails are active during the daytime and inactive at night. It bury itself into the mud, when the tide is high, probably to avoid water predators. They are on the surface feeding and mating when the tide is low.

Clithon oualaniense is herbivorous, feeding of microalgae and on detritus.

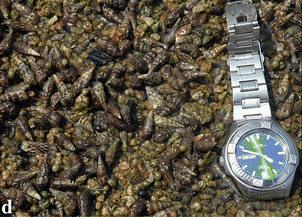
Aggregation of Batillaria zonalis and Clithon oualaniense in situ.
