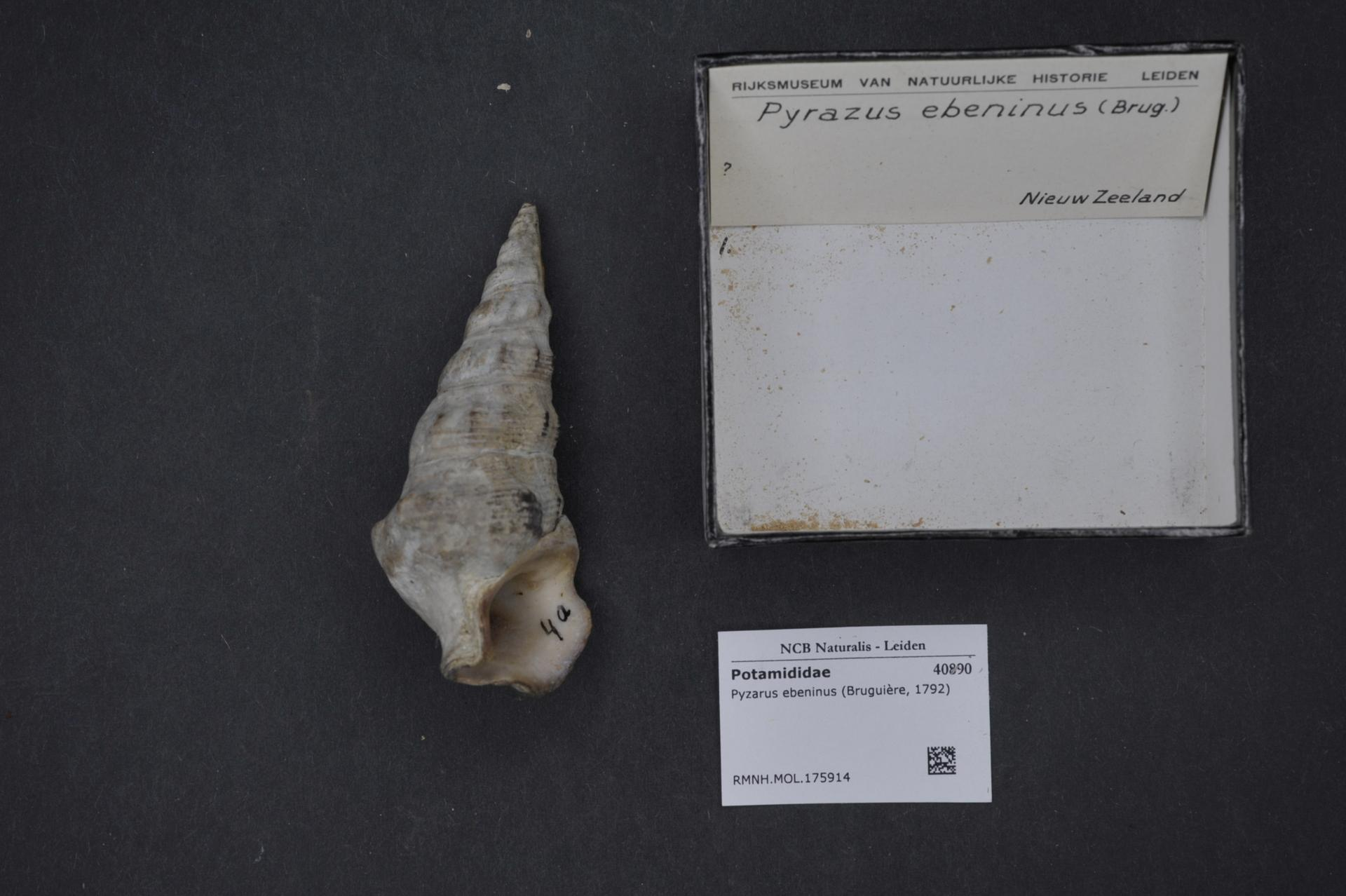

Scientific classification
- Kingdom: Animalia
- Phylum: Mollusca
- Class: Gastropoda
- Subclass: Caenogastropoda
- Order: incertae sedis
- Family: Batillariidae
- Genus: Pyrazus
- Species: P. ebeninus

Binomial name
- Pyrazus ebeninus (Bruguière, 1792)

= Pyrazus ebeninus =

Species of gastropod

Pyrazus ebeninus, commonly known as Hercules club mud whelk, mud whelk, Hercules club whelk, or Hercules whelk, is a species of sea snail. It is a marine gastropod mollusk in the family Batillariidae. It is endemic to Australia, mainly along the east coast, inhabiting mud flats.

Other names formerly ascribed to the species have been Clava herculea (Martyn, 1784); Cerithium ebeninum (Bruguière, 1792); Pyrazus baudini (Montfort, 1810); Lampania angulifera (Sowerby II, 1866); and Pyrazus herculea.

The species is most abundant in tropical or subtropical waters off Queensland and New South Wales, but has been found as far south as Tasmania. It had not been detected in the Port River in Adelaide, South Australia, since the last ice age, up to around 10,000 years ago, but in 2023, recent sightings there were confirmed by researcher Brad Martin. Scientists surmise that they were seeded there by ballast water brought in by ships, and growing beds of razorfish (Pinna bicolor) beds and oyster reefs have provided nurseries for the whelk. One sighting was posted on iNaturalist on 28 September 2022.
