= Reticunassa balteata =

Scientific classification
- Kingdom: Animalia
- Phylum: Mollusca
- Class: Gastropoda
- Subclass: Caenogastropoda
- Order: Neogastropoda
- Superfamily: Buccinoidea
- Family: Nassariidae
- Genus: Reticunassa
- Species: R. balteata

Binomial name
- Reticunassa balteata (Pease, 1869)

Synonyms
- Nassa (Hima) balteata Pease, 1869; Nassa balteata Pease, 1869 (invalid: junior homonym of Nassa balteata Lischke, 1869); Nassarius balteatus (Pease, 1869)

Species of gastropod

Reticunassa balteata is a species of sea snail, a marine gastropod mollusc in the family Nassariidae, the Nassa mud snails or dog whelks.

This is considered a taxon inquirendum.

== Distribution ==
This species occurs in the Indian Ocean off Madagascar and the Marshall Islands
