= Reticunassa hanraveni =

Scientific classification
- Kingdom: Animalia
- Phylum: Mollusca
- Class: Gastropoda
- Subclass: Caenogastropoda
- Order: Neogastropoda
- Family: Nassariidae
- Genus: Reticunassa
- Species: R. hanraveni

Binomial name
- Reticunassa hanraveni (Kool & Dekker, 2006)

Synonyms
- Nassarius hanraveni Kool & Dekker, 2006 (original combination)

Species of gastropod

Reticunassa hanraveni is a species of sea snail, a marine gastropod mollusc in the family Nassariidae, the Nassa mud snails or dog whelks.

== Description ==
The length of the shell varies between 4.5 mm and 6.5 mm.

== Distribution ==
This marine species occurs off Borneo and Java.
