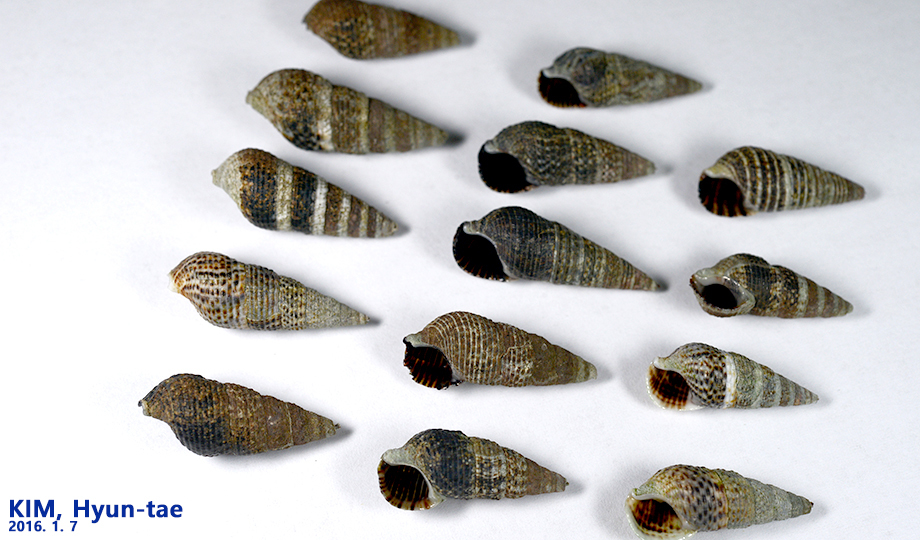
- Shells

Scientific classification
- Kingdom: Animalia
- Phylum: Mollusca
- Class: Gastropoda
- Subclass: Caenogastropoda
- Order: incertae sedis
- Family: Batillariidae
- Genus: Batillaria
- Species: B. attramentaria

Binomial name
- Batillaria attramentaria (G. B. Sowerby I, 1855)

= Batillaria attramentaria =

Japanese mud snail

Species of gastropod

Batillaria attramentaria, common name the Japanese mud snail, is a marine gastropod mollusk in the family Batillariidae. It is a species of sea snail most often found in the salt marshes and mudflats of marine, estuarine, riparian and wetland habitats. Introduced to North America between the 1920s to 1930s via the coasts of Washington and California, the Japanese mud snail became an invasive species notorious for reducing biodiversity by outcompeting the native hornsnail Cerithidea californica.

== Description ==
The shell is variable in size and colour. It is acute, 20-30mm tall and with 8-10 whorls.

== Distribution ==
The native range of Batillaria attramentaria extends from the Kuril Islands and southern Sakhalin, Russia, to Hong Kong. It has been introduced into North America, where it now occurs from Boundary Bay, British Columbia, Canada, to Elkhorn Slough, Monterey, California, USA.

== As an invasive species ==
The species was probably first introduced to California sometime between 1920 and 1930 from Japan. Due to Batillaria attramentaria's superior abilities to compete for food, habitats in which the species has been introduced typically see a drastic drop in the population of California hornsnails. The species has also introduced trematode parasites which have also contributed to the decline in numbers of other gastropods in the area.
