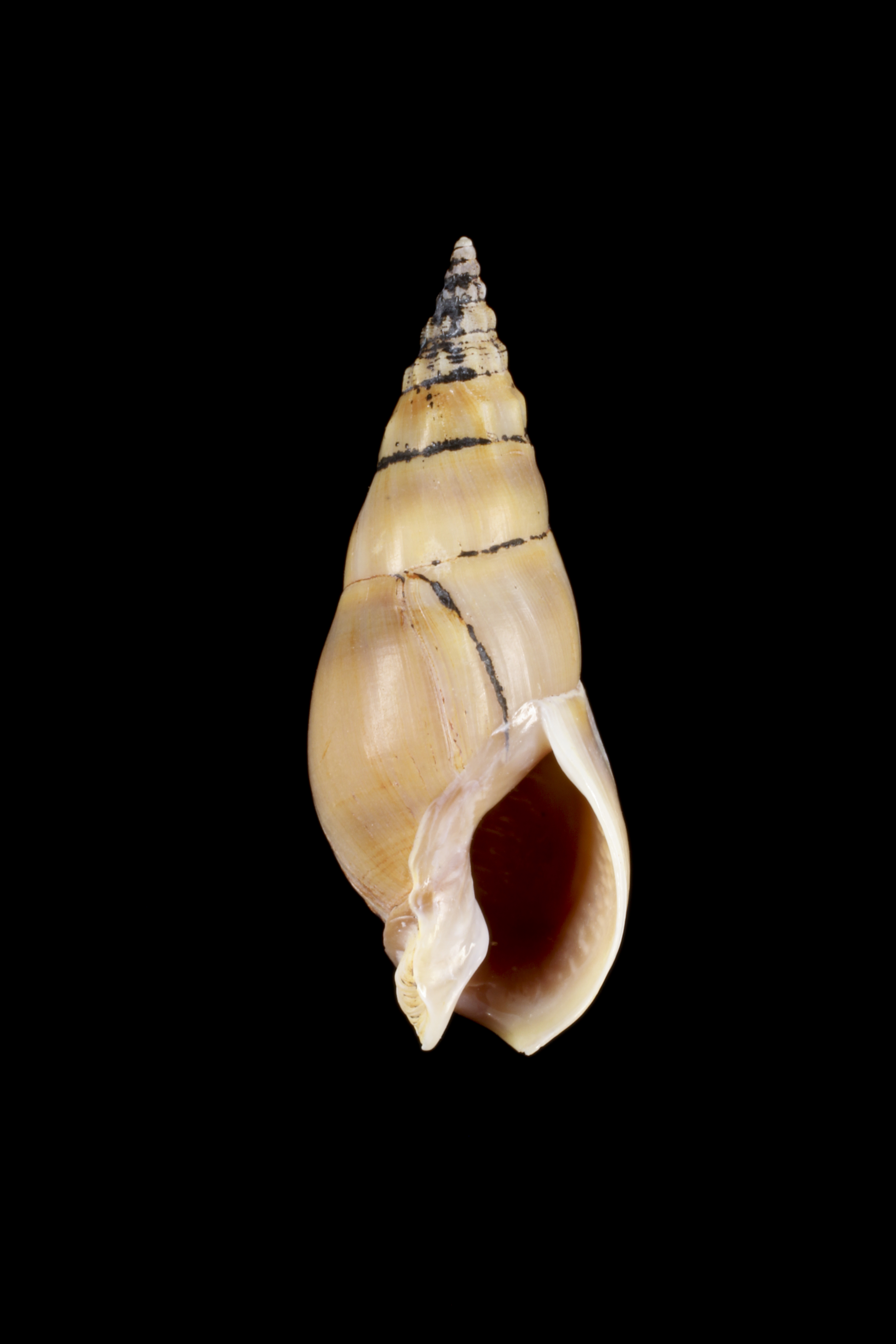
- Shell of Tritia ephamilla (specimen at MNHN, Paris)

Scientific classification
- Kingdom: Animalia
- Phylum: Mollusca
- Class: Gastropoda
- Subclass: Caenogastropoda
- Order: Neogastropoda
- Family: Nassariidae
- Genus: Tritia
- Species: T. ephamilla

Binomial name
- Tritia ephamilla (R. B. Watson, 1882)

Synonyms
- Alectrion dissimilis (R. B. Watson, 1886); Alectrion ephamillus (R. B. Watson, 1882) (superseded combination); Arcularia dipsacoides Hedley, 1907 (junior subjective synonym); Nassa (Tritia) ephamilla R. B. Watson, 1882 (superseded combination); Nassa dissimilis R. B. Watson, 1886 · (junior subjective synonym); Nassa ephamilla R. B. Watson, 1882 (superseded combination); Nassarius (Cryptonassarius) ephamillus (R. B. Watson, 1882) (superseded combination); Nassarius dipsacoides (Hedley, 1907); Nassarius dissimilis (R. B. Watson, 1886); Nassarius ephamillus (R. B. Watson, 1882) (superseded combination); Reticunassa dipsacoides (Hedley, 1907); Reticunassa flindersi Cotton & Godfrey, 1938 (junior subjective synonym)

= Tritia ephamilla =

Species of gastropod

Tritia ephamilla is a species of sea snail, a marine gastropod mollusk in the family Nassariidae, the Nassa mud snails or dog whelks.

== Description ==
The length of the shell attains 22 mm, its diameter 12 mm.

(Description as "Nassa dissimilis") The shell is thin and very stumpy, featuring a short, broad body whorl, a short, rounded base, and a short, conical, subscalar spire. It has a very short, gibbously rounded aperture and an excessively short columella.

The sculpture consists of frequent, feeble riblets appearing at irregular distances, which are dotted with small, round tubercles. The shallow parting furrows are broadish and are scored with strongish lines of growth. In terms of spirals, the tubercles on the riblets, though unconnected, are arranged in rows; there are 5 or 6 such rows on the body whorl. Below these, on the base, are 5 feeble, distant threads. The scar of the old siphonal canal twines around the columella and occupies its whole length. The upper edge of this scar is keeled with a sharp thread, above which lies a furrow.

The shell's color is white. The spire is low, stumpy, and subscalar, though its apex is broken. There are 4.5 remaining whorls; they are short, broad, and convex. The body whorl is a little tumid, with a short, rounded base.

The aperture is direct, small, and round. The outer lip is regularly curved. The siphonal canal, with its reverted lip, is very oblique, lies in front of the columella point, and falls short of the prominence of the basal lip. The inner lip is flat across the body and advances very little there. At the base of the columella, the inner lip is flatly concave. The columella is excessively short, and its extreme point does not project beyond the siphonal canal edge and the bottom of the siphonal canal, as these two are, in consequence of the canal's obliquity, at the same level.

== Distribution ==
This species is occurs off New Zealand and Australia (New South Wales, South Australia, Tasmania, Victoria, Western Australia).
