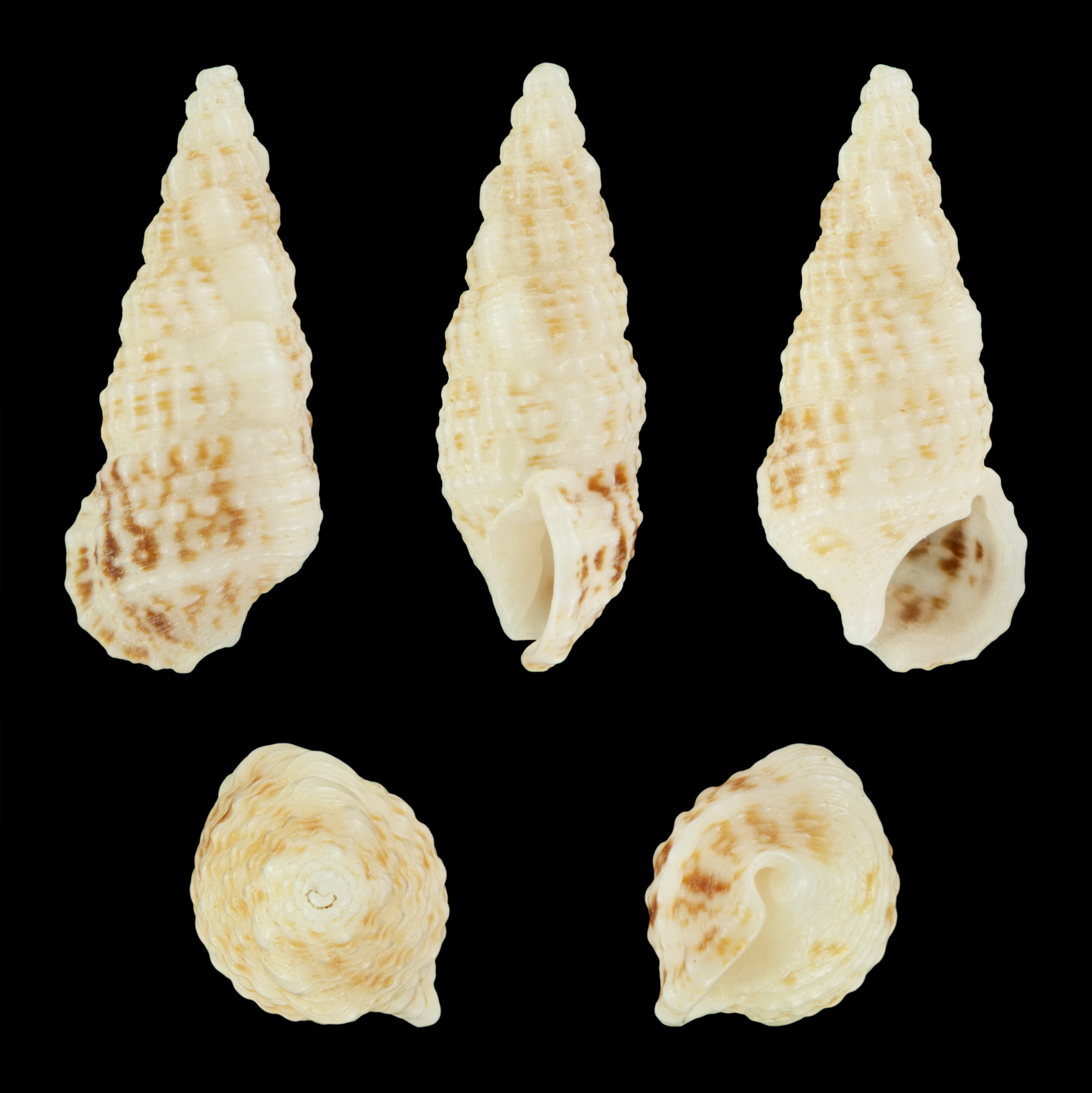

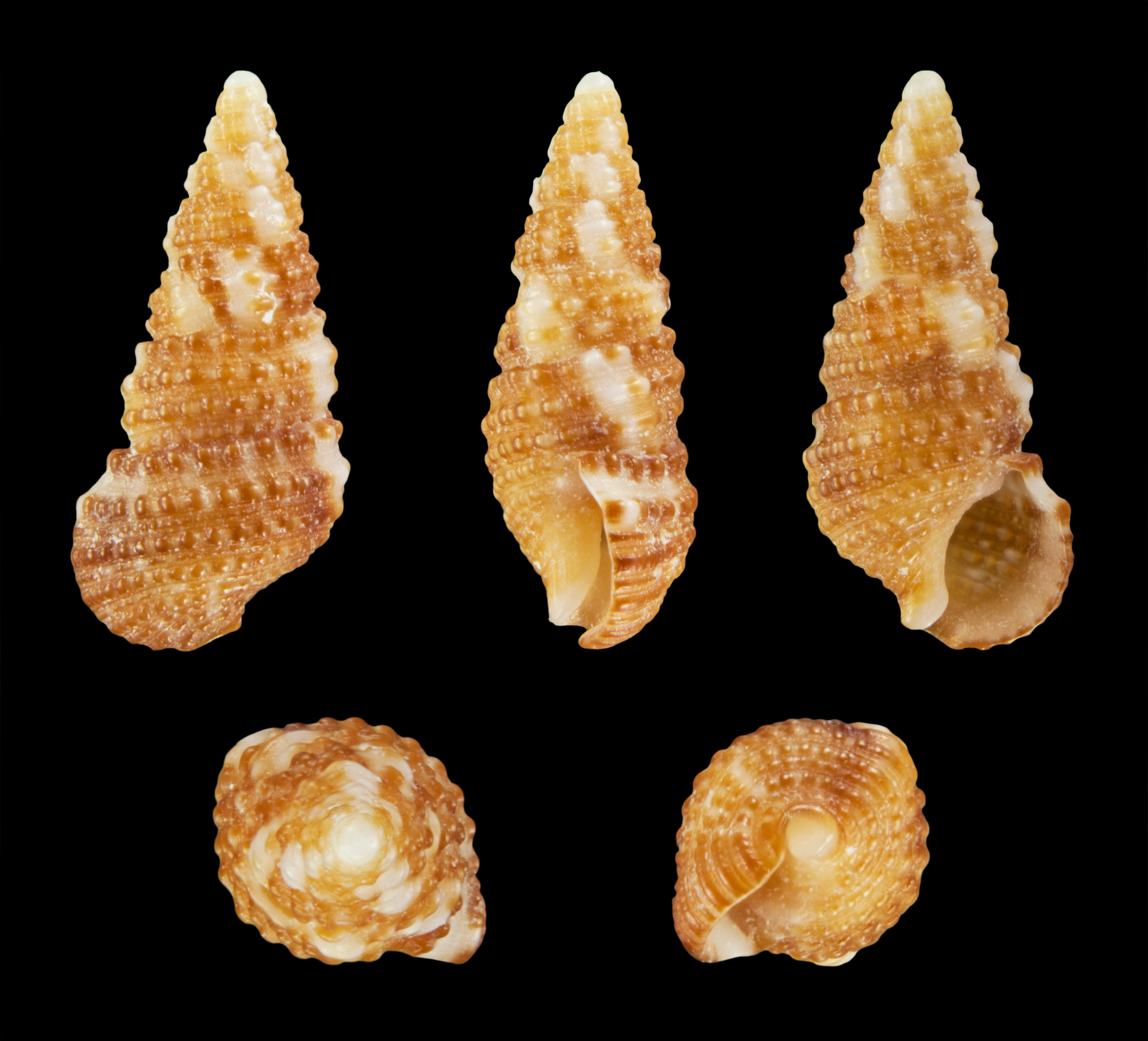

Scientific classification
- Kingdom: Animalia
- Phylum: Mollusca
- Class: Gastropoda
- Subclass: Caenogastropoda
- Order: incertae sedis
- Family: Cerithiidae
- Genus: Cerithium
- Species: C. lutosum

Binomial name
- Cerithium lutosum Menke, 1828

Synonyms
- Cerithium alabastrum Mörch, 1876; Cerithium bermudae G.B. Sowerby II, 1865; Cerithium eriense Kiener, 1841; Cerithium ferrugineum Say, 1832; Cerithium lutuosum Cerithium megasoma C.B. Adams, 1850; Cerithium mutabile C.B. Adams, 1845; Cerithium nigrinum Philippi, 1848; Cerithium rissoidae Cerithium rissoide G.B. Sowerby II, 1865; Cerithium rissoiide Cerithium sagrae d'Orbigny, 1847; Cerithium sagrae var. pallida Mörch, 1876; Cerithium thomasiae G.B. Sowerby II, 1865; Cerithium variabile C.B. Adams, 1845; Cerithium variabile var. calcarea Usticke, 1959; Cerithium versicolor C.B. Adams, 1850; Cerithium versicolor var. grisea Mörch, 1876; Lampanella eriensis (Kiener, 1841); Pyrazus (Lampanella) eriensis (Kiener, 1841); Pyrazus (Lampanella) eriensis var. minor Mörch, 1876; Thericium biminiense Pilsbry & McGinty, 1949

= Cerithium lutosum =

Species of gastropod

Cerithium lutosum is a species of sea snail, a marine gastropod mollusk in the family Cerithiidae.

== Distribution ==
The distribution of Cerithium lutosum includes North America.

== Description ==
The maximum recorded shell length is 20 mm.

== Habitat ==
Minimum recorded depth is 0 m. Maximum recorded depth is 8 m.
