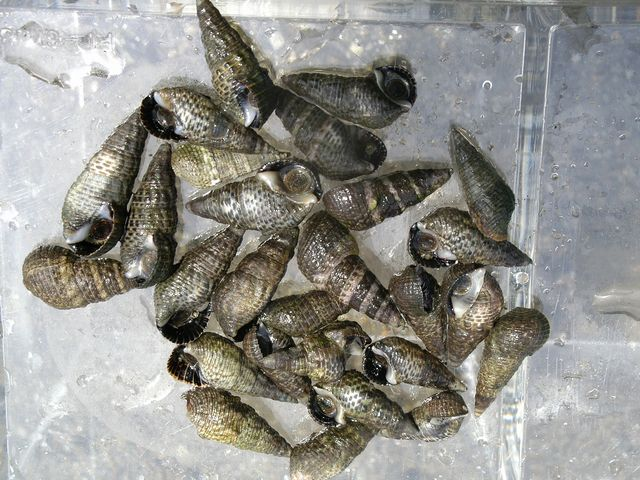
- Batillaria multiformis

Scientific classification
- Kingdom: Animalia
- Phylum: Mollusca
- Class: Gastropoda
- Subclass: Caenogastropoda
- Order: incertae sedis
- Superfamily: Cerithioidea
- Family: Batillariidae; Thiele, 1929

Diversity
- 14 extant species

Synonyms
- Pyrazidae Hacobjan, 1972; Tiaracerithiinae Bouniol, 1981; Batillaridae

= Batillariidae =

Batillariidae Temporal range: Eocene–Recent

Family of gastropods

Batillariidae, common name batillariids or mudcreepers, are a family of marine, cerithioidean gastropod molluscs in thesuperfamily Cerithioidea.

They consist of 14 living species, classified in six to eight genera.

According to the taxonomy of the Gastropoda by Bouchet & Rocroi (2005) the family Batillariidae has no subfamilies. However, a recent molecular study has found that the Batillariidae as traditionally conceived are not monophyletic. The Neotropical genera Lampanella and Rhinocoryne are sister to the Planaxidae. The monophyletic Batillariidae sensu stricto are restricted to the northwestern Pacific and Australasia.

A revised generic classification has been suggested that is consistent with a molecular phylogenetic hypothesis. Accordingly, within the Batillariidae four genera Batillaria, Pyrazus, Velacumantus and Zeacumantus have been recognized. This delimitation of taxa is consistent with a revised definition of the family based on shell characters.

== Ecology and distribution ==
Batillarids are abundant on sandy mudflats, and sometimes on rocky shores, on continental margins in the warm-temperate to tropical regions of the northwestern Pacific Ocean, Australasia and the Americas.

== Fossil record and biogeography ==
Batillariids appeared in the Late Cretaceous or Palaeocene, and the extinct genera Pyrazopsis, Vicinocerithium and Granulolabium became diverse in the Tethyan realm before the group disappeared from Europe at the end of the Miocene. The Batillariidae s. s. reached Australia and New Zealand by the Late Oligocene, and the genera Pyrazus, Velacumantus and Zeacumantus still survive in this refugium of Tethyan fauna. Two lineages, Batillaria and the extinct Tateiwaia, migrated north to China and Japan in the Early Miocene, to establish the present disjunct distribution of this relictual group in southern Australasia and the Oriental region.

== Genera ==
Genera within the family Batillariidae include:

Neotropical genera (to be placed in a new family):

- Lampanella Mörch, 1876
- Rhinocoryne Martens, 1900

Indopacific genera (Batillariidae sensu stricto):

- Batillaria Benson, 1842 - type genus of the family Batillariidae, synonym: Lampania Gray, 1847
- Pyrazus Montfort, 1810
- Zeacumantus Finlay, 1926, synonym: Batillariella Thiele, 1931
- Velacumantus Iredale, 1936

Fossil genera:

- Granulolabium Cossmann, 1889
- Tiaracerithium Sacco, 1895; possibly a synonym of Granulolabium
- Vicinocerithium E. Wood, 1910
- Tateiwaia Makiyama, 1936
- Pyrazopsis Akopjan, 1972
