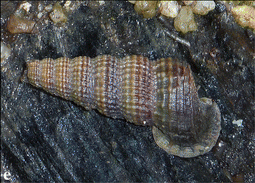
- A live Cerithidea quoyii

Scientific classification
- Kingdom: Animalia
- Phylum: Mollusca
- Class: Gastropoda
- Subclass: Caenogastropoda
- Order: incertae sedis
- Superfamily: Cerithioidea
- Family: Potamididae
- Genus: Cerithidea; Swainson, 1840

Type species
- Melania lineolata Gray in Griffith & Pidgeon, 1833

Synonyms
- Aphanistylus P. Fischer, 1884; Cerithidea (Cerithidea) Swainson, 1840; Cerithium (Cerithidea); Phaenommia Mörch, 1860; Potamides (Aphanistylus) P. Fischer, 1884; Potamides (Cerithidea)

= Cerithidea =

Genus of gastropods

Cerithidea is a genus of medium-sized sea snails or mud snails, marine gastropod mollusks in the family Potamididae, the horn snails.

== Species ==
There used to be three subgenera in the genus Cerithidea: subgenus Cerithea, subgenus Cerithideopsis and subgenus Cerithideopsilla. These have been brought to the status of genus.

- Cerithidea andamanensis Reid, 2014
- Cerithidea anticipata Iredale, 1929
- Cerithidea balteata A. Adams, 1855
- † Cerithidea bifurcata Kilburn & Tankard, 1975
- Cerithidea charbonnieri (Petit de la Saussaye, 1851)
- Cerithidea decollata (Linnaeus, 1758)
- Cerithidea dohrni (Kobelt, 1890)
- Cerithidea houbricki Reid, 2014
- † Cerithidea kanpokuensis
- Cerithidea moerchii (A. Adams, 1855)
- † Cerithidea nebrascensis (Meek & Hayden, 1856)
- Cerithidea obtusa (Lamarck, 1822) - type species
- Cerithidea quoyii (Hombron & Jacquinot, 1848)
- Cerithidea reidi Houbrick, 1986
- Cerithidea rhizophorarum A. Adams, 1855
- Cerithidea sinensis (Philippi, 1848)
- Cerithidea tonkiniana Mabille, 1887
- Cerithidea weyersi Dautzenberg, 1899

Species brought into synonymy

- Cerithidea alata (Philippi, 1849): synonym of Pirenella alata (Philippi, 1849)
- Cerithidea albonodosa Gould & Carpenter, 1857: synonym of Cerithideopsis californica (Haldeman, 1840)
- Cerithidea alternata Hutton, 1873: synonym of Batillaria australis (Quoy & Gaimard, 1834)
- Cerithidea bombayana G. B. Sowerby II, 1866: synonym of Pirenella conica (Blainville, 1829)
- Cerithidea californica (Haldeman, 1840): synonym of Cerithideopsis californica (Haldeman, 1840)
- Cerithidea caiyingyai Qian Z.-X., Fang Y.-F. & He J., 2013: synonym of Pirenella caiyingyai (Qian, Fang & He, 2013)
- Cerithidea cingulata (Gmelin, 1791): synonym of Cerithideopsilla cingulata (Gmelin, 1791) accepted as Pirenella cingulata (Gmelin, 1791
- Cerithidea cornea A. Adams, 1855: synonym of Cerithidea balteata A. Adams, 1855
- Cerithidea costata (da Costa, 1778): synonym of Cerithideopsis costata (da Costa, 1778)
- Cerithidea crassilabrum A. Adams, 1855: synonym of Cerithideopsis scalariformis (Say, 1825)
- Cerithidea dahlakensis Biggs, 1965: synonym of Bittium proteum (Jousseaume, 1931)
- Cerithidea djadjariensis (K. Martin, 1899): synonym of Cerithideopsilla djadjariensis (K. Martin, 1899)
- Cerithidea fluviatilis (Potiez & Michaud, 1838): synonym of Pirenella cingulata (Gmelin, 1791)
- Cerithidea fortunei A. Adams, 1855: synonym of Cerithideopsis largillierti (Philippi, 1848)
- Cerithidea fuscata Gould, 1857 - this species has probably become extinct in recent times: synonym of Cerithideopsis californica (Haldeman, 1840)
- Cerithidea hanleyana: synonym of G. B. Sowerby II, 1866: synonym of Cerithideopsis costata (da Costa, 1778)
- Cerithidea largillierti (Philippi, 1848): synonym of Cerithideopsis largillierti (Philippi, 1848)
- Cerithidea layardii A. Adams, 1855: synonym of Pirenella conica (Blainville, 1829)
- Cerithidea mazatlanica Carpenter, 1857: synonym of Cerithideopsis californica (Haldeman, 1840)
- Cerithidea microptera (Kiener, 1842): synonym of Pirenella microptera (Kiener, 1841)
- Cerithidea montagnei (d'Orbigny, 1841): synonym of Cerithideopsis montagnei (d'Orbigny, 1841)
- Cerithidea multicostata Schepman, 1919: synonym of Cerithidea anticipata Iredale, 1929
- Cerithidea mutata Pilsbry & Vanatta, 1902: synonym of Batillaria mutata (Pilsbry & Vanatta, 1902)
- Cerithidea ornata A. Adams, 1863: synonym of Cerithidea balteata A. Adams, 1855
- Cerithidea pauxilla A. Adams, 1855: synonym for Varicopeza pauxilla (A. Adams, 1855)
- Cerithidea pliculosa (Menke, 1829): synonym of Cerithideopsis pliculosa (Menke, 1829)
- Cerithidea pulchra (C. B. Adams, 1852): synonym of Cerithideopsis pulchra (C. B. Adams, 1852)
- Cerithidea quadrata G. B. Sowerby II, 1866: synonym of Cerithidea quoyii (Hombron & Jacquinot, 1848)
- Cerithidea raricostata A. Adams, 1855: synonym of Cerithidea balteata A. Adams, 1855
- Cerithidea rollei Kobelt, 1890: synonym of Cerithideopsis scalariformis (Say, 1825)
- Cerithidea scalariformis (Say, 1825): synonym of Cerithideopsis scalariformis (Say, 1825)
- Cerithidea tenkatei Schepman, 1893: synonym of Terebralia palustris (Linnaeus, 1767)
- Cerithidea valida (C. B. Adams, 1852): synonym of Cerithideopsis californica (Haldeman, 1840)
