= Notocotylus fosteri =

Scientific classification
- Kingdom: Animalia
- Phylum: Platyhelminthes
- Class: Trematoda
- Order: Plagiorchiida
- Family: Notocotylidae
- Genus: Notocotylus
- Species: N. fosteri

Binomial name
- Notocotylus fosteri Kinsella and Tkach, 2005

Species of fluke

Notocotylus fosteri is a parasitic fluke that infects the marsh rice rat (Oryzomys palustris) in Florida.

N. fosteri was discovered in a saltwater marsh at Waccasassa Bay, near Cedar Key, Levy County, Florida, in 2003 and named as a new species of Notocotylus in a 2005 paper by John Kinsella and Vasyl Tkach. The species was named after Garry W. Foster, "friend and colleague" of the authors. N. fosteri was found in the caecum of three of four studied marsh rice rats, with two to twenty worms present per infected rat. Another study of the parasites of Cedar Key marsh rice rats in 1970–1972 did not find N. fosteri, but instead another notocotylid, Catatropis johnstoni, perhaps because of small-scale habitat differences within the marsh, for example in the distribution of snails, or because the N. fosteri that infected rice rats originated from birds. As in other Notocotylus, snails may be intermediate hosts, and it is possible that it also infects birds, as most species of the genus do.

The worm is 2705 to 3125 μm long and 955 to 1095 μm wide. It is distinctive in having the genital pore located far to the front, above the oral sucker, a character it shares with only two other Notostrongylus species, but these two differ in having one row of papillae on the lower side of the body, not three as in N. fosteri. N. johnstoni is most similar to N. fosteri; it infects the rakali (Hydromys chrysogaster), which is semiaquatic like the marsh rice rat. The similarity may be caused by convergent evolution resulting from the similar habits of the respective hosts of these species.

== Literature cited ==
- Kinsella, John M; Tkach, Vasyl V (2005-09-01). "Notocotylus fosteri sp. nov. (Trematoda, Notocotylidae) from the rice rat, Oryzomys palustris in Florida" (PDF). Acta Parasitologica. 50 (3). Springer Nature: 194–198. ISSN 1896-1851.
