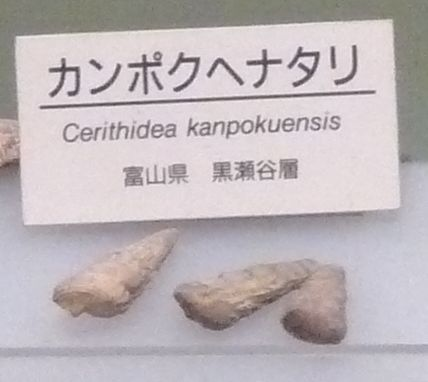
- A shell of Cerithidea kanpokuensis

Scientific classification
- Kingdom: Animalia
- Phylum: Mollusca
- Class: Gastropoda
- Subclass: Caenogastropoda
- Order: incertae sedis
- Family: Potamididae
- Genus: Cerithidea
- Species: †C. kanpokuensis

Binomial name
- †Cerithidea kanpokuensis (Makiyama, 1926)

Synonyms
- † Potamides (Cerithidea) kanpokuensis Makiyama, 1926 superseded combination

= Cerithidea kanpokuensis =

Species of mollusc

Cerithidea kanpokuensis is an extinct species of snail, a marine gastropod mollusc in the family Potamididae.

== Description ==
The shell has a conical shape.

== Biology ==
This species is part of a genus known for deposit feeding. It feeds on benthic diatoms and detritus.

== Distribution ==
This species is located in East Asia.
