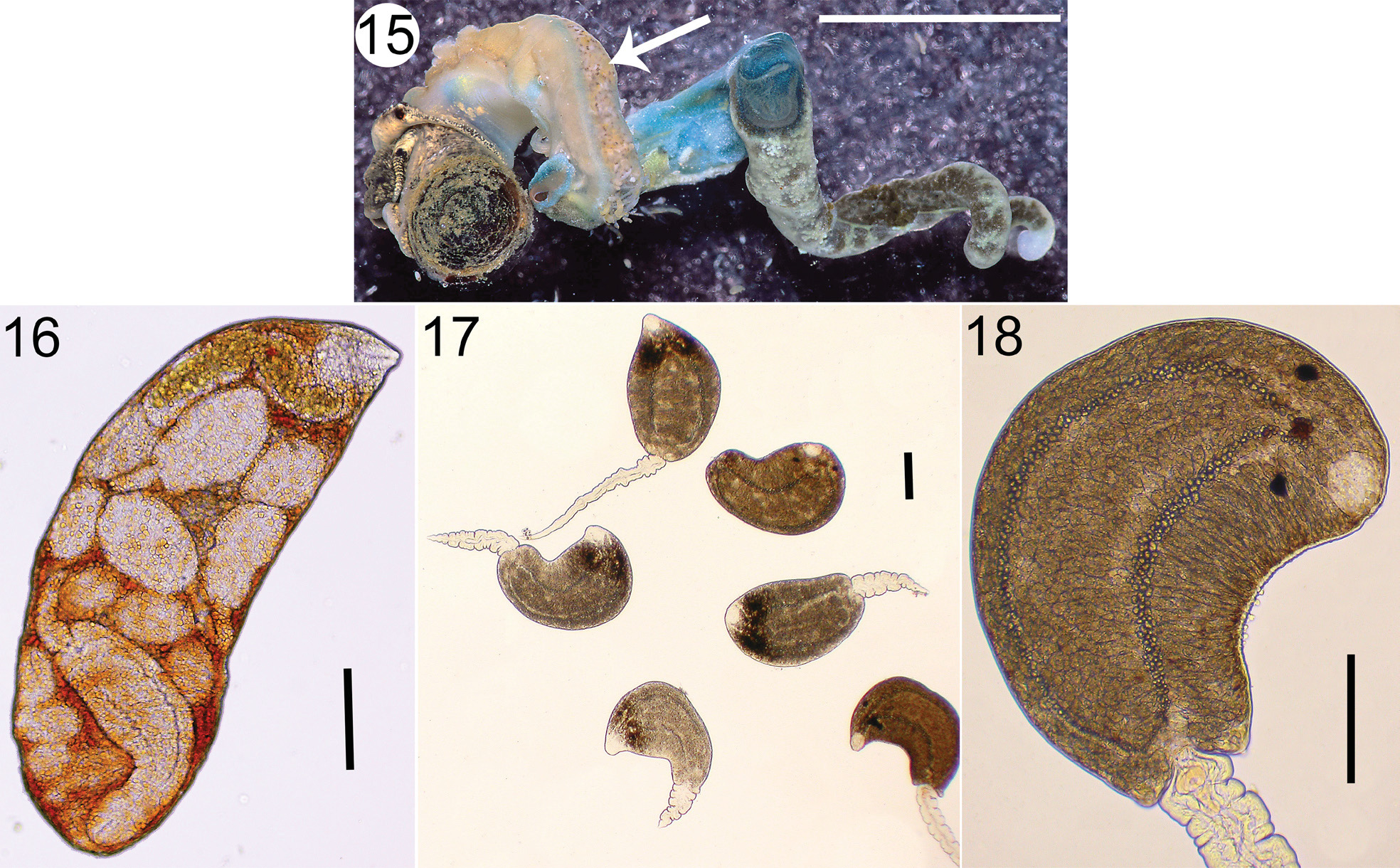

Scientific classification
- Kingdom: Animalia
- Phylum: Platyhelminthes
- Class: Trematoda
- Order: Plagiorchiida
- Family: Notocotylidae
- Genus: Catatropis
- Species: C. johnstoni

Binomial name
- Catatropis johnstoni Martin, 1956

= Catatropis johnstoni =

Species of fluke

Catatropis johnstoni is a fluke from the United States. It was first described in 1956 by Martin, who had found cercariae (a larval stage of a fluke) released by the snail Cerithidea californica in southwestern California. When the cercaria were fed into chickens (Gallus gallus domesticus), they developed into mature worms; Martin speculated that the natural host was a waterbird. In 1970, a study of helminths of the marsh rice rat (Oryzomys palustris) in a saltmarsh at Cedar Key, Florida, found flukes similar to C. johnstoni. The fluke was present in 30% of 110 examined rice rats, with the number of worms per rat varying from 1 to 500 (average 91). Some Cerithidea scalariformis snails from this marsh also released cercariae similar to C. johnstoni from California. When introduced into chickens, marsh rice rats, Mongolian gerbils (Meriones unguiculatus), golden hamsters (Mesocricetus auratus), and house mice (Mus musculus), these cercariae developed into infectious flukes. Bush and Kinsella, who reported on the result in 1972, regarded the Florida and California flukes as the same species, as there were only minor size differences between them. Because no marsh-inhabiting rodent occurs in both California and Florida, they agreed with Martin that the normal host of C. johnstoni was most likely a bird, perhaps a rail or shorebird. Nevertheless, the rate of infection in the rice rat is too high for it to be just an accidental host; perhaps C. johnstoni is restricted to saltmarshes but not host-specific.

Catatropis johnstoni lacks a series of lateral papillae (nipple-like structures) on the underside, which are normally present in Catatropis. In this character, it resembles the Australian C. nicolli, which has the genital pore located further to the front. C. johnstoni does have a median ridge on the underside, another character of Catatropis, but unlike in all other species of the genus, this ridge is not smooth, but consists of a series of distinct but closely spaced papillae. Because of this character, it may not in fact belong in Catatropis.

== Literature cited ==
- Bush, Albert O.; Kinsella, John M. (1972). "A Natural Definitive Host for Catatropis johnstoni Martin, 1956 (Trematoda: Notocotylidae), with Notes on Experimental Host Specificity and Intraspecific Variation". The Journal of Parasitology. 58 (4): 843–5. doi:10.2307/3278335. JSTOR 3278335. PMID 5057245.
- Cribb, T. H. (1991). "Notocotylidae (Digenea) from the Australian water rat Hydromys chrysogaster Geoffroy, 1804 (Muridae)". Systematic Parasitology. 18 (3): 227–237. doi:10.1007/bf00009362. S2CID 32819783.
- Kinsella, J.M. (1988). "Comparison of helminths of rice rats, Oryzomys palustris, from freshwater and saltwater marshes in Florida". Proceedings of the Helminthological Society of Washington. 55 (2): 275–280.
