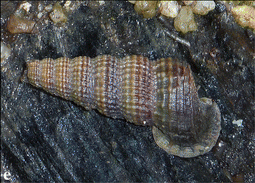
- A live Cerithidea quoyii

Scientific classification
- Kingdom: Animalia
- Phylum: Mollusca
- Class: Gastropoda
- Subclass: Caenogastropoda
- Order: incertae sedis
- Family: Potamididae
- Genus: Cerithidea
- Species: C. quoyii

Binomial name
- Cerithidea quoyii (Hombron & Jacquinot, 1848)

Synonyms
- Cerithium quoyii Hombron & Jacquinot, 1848; Cerithidea quadrata G. B. Sowerby II, 1866

= Cerithidea quoyii =

Species of gastropod

Cerithidea quoyii is a species of brackish water snail, a gastropod mollusk in the family Potamididae.

== Distribution ==
This marine species occurs along the coasts of Vietnam and the Philippines.

== Gallery ==
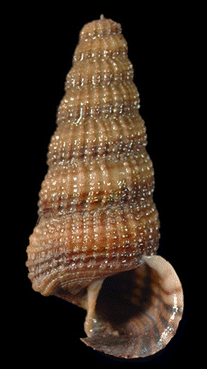
Cerithidea quoyii shell.

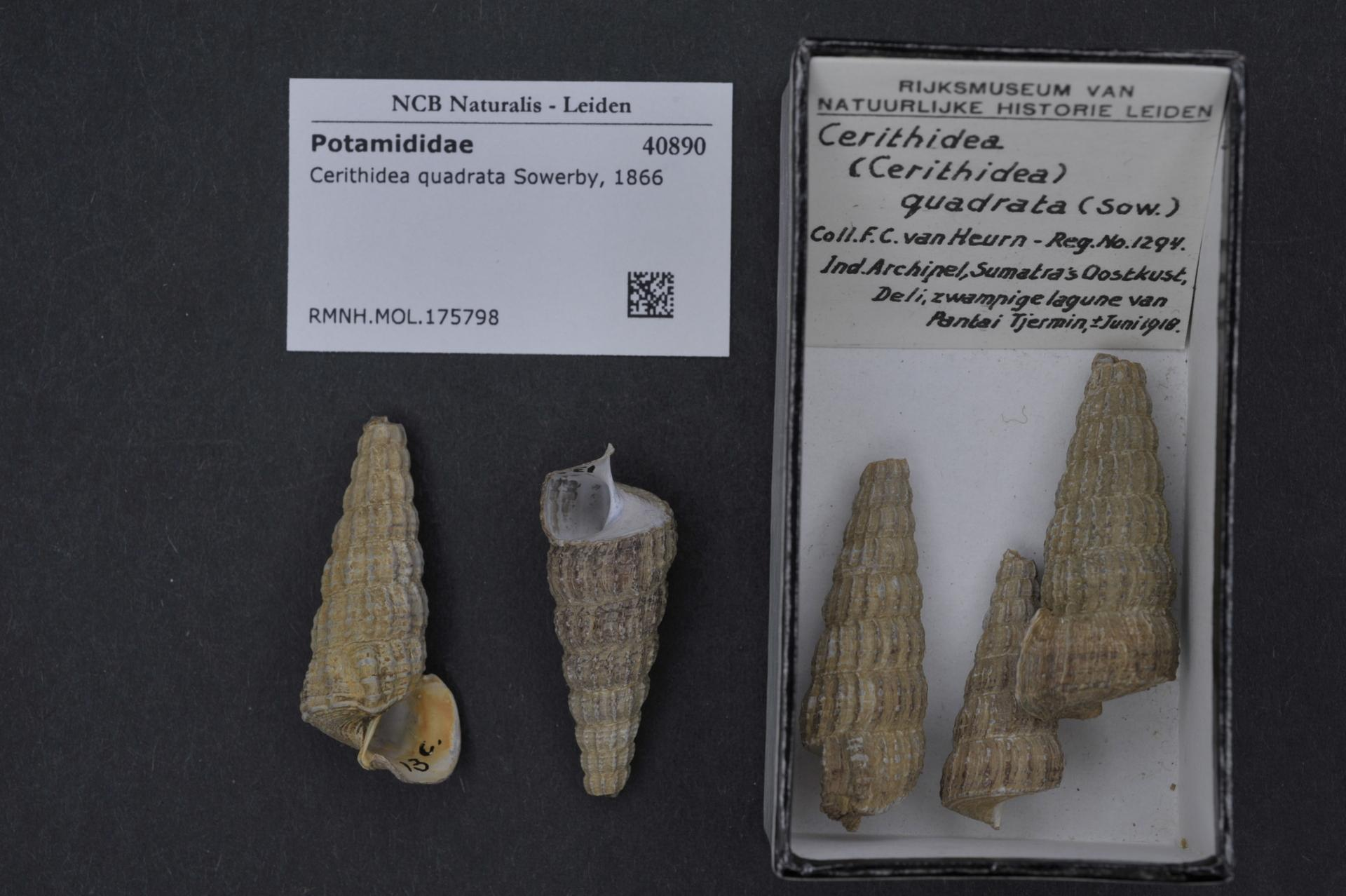
Cerithidea quoyii shells.

== Ecology ==
Cerithidea quoyii is a predominantly mangrove-associated species.
