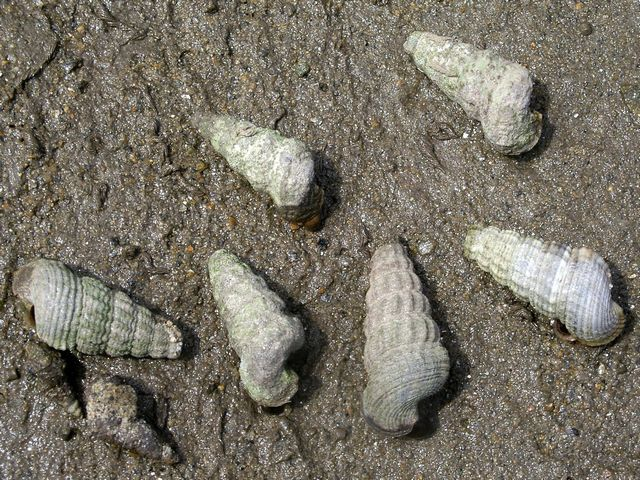

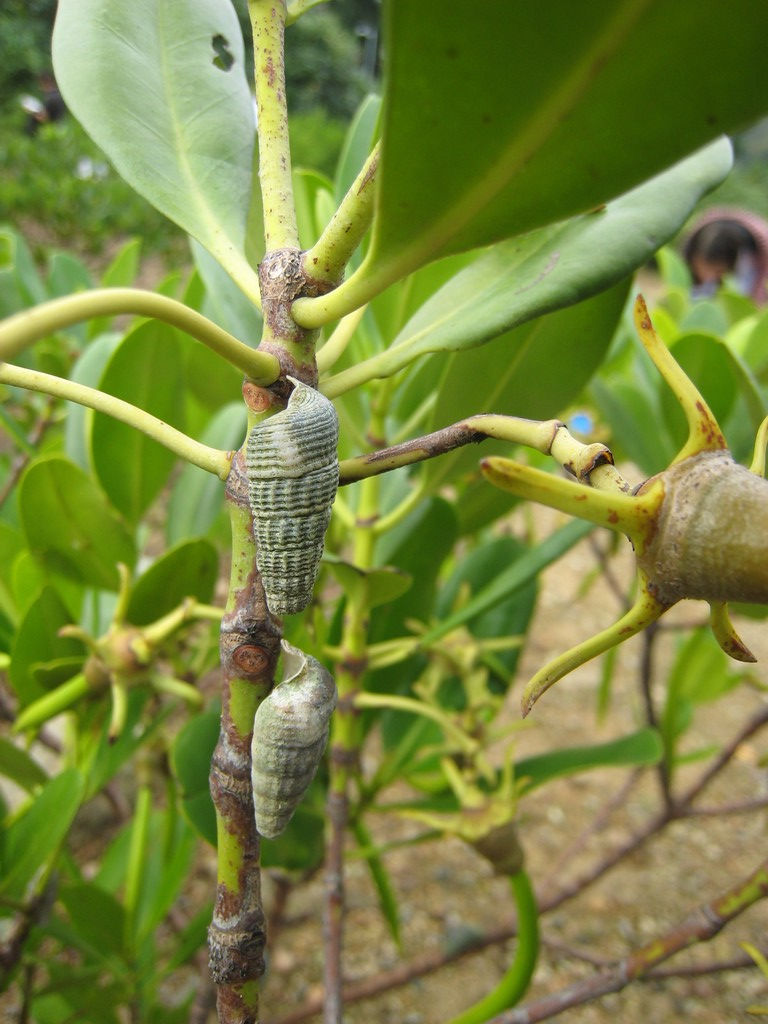
- Cerithidea rhizophorarum attached to Kandelia obovata

Scientific classification
- Kingdom: Animalia
- Phylum: Mollusca
- Class: Gastropoda
- Subclass: Caenogastropoda
- Order: incertae sedis
- Family: Potamididae
- Genus: Cerithidea
- Species: C. rhizophorarum

Binomial name
- Cerithidea rhizophorarum A. Adams, 1855

= Cerithidea rhizophorarum =

Species of gastropod

Cerithidea rhizophorarum is a species of sea snail, a marine gastropod mollusk in the family Potamididae.
