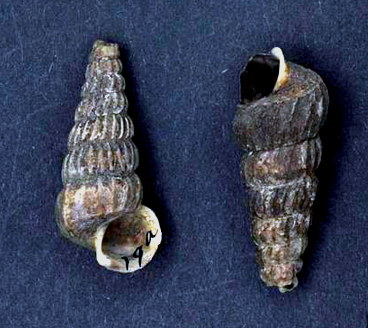
- Two shells of Cerithidea balteata (museum specimens at Naturalis Biodiversity Center)

Scientific classification
- Kingdom: Animalia
- Phylum: Mollusca
- Class: Gastropoda
- Subclass: Caenogastropoda
- Order: incertae sedis
- Family: Potamididae
- Genus: Cerithidea
- Species: C. balteata

Binomial name
- Cerithidea balteata A. Adams, 1855

Synonyms
- Cerithidea cornea A. Adams, 1855; Cerithidea ornata A. Adams, 1863; Cerithidea raricostata A. Adams, 1855; Cerithium (Cerithidea) balteatum (A. Adams, 1855); Cerithium (Cerithidea) balteatum var. mindorensis Kobelt, 1895; Cerithium (Cerithidea) quadrasi Kobelt, 1895; Cerithium ornatum G. B. Sowerby II, 1855

= Cerithidea balteata =

Species of gastropod

Cerithidea balteata is a species of snail, a brackish-water gastropod mollusk in the family Potamididae.

== Description ==
The shell is elongated and conical, with a height ranging from 16.0 to 37.3 mm. Adult shells are typically decollate, retaining five to eight whorls. The spire whorls are rounded to slightly flattened, with a distinct suture and a straight to slightly convex spire profile. Shell thickness varies from thin to moderately thick.

The aperture has a flared and moderately thickened outer lip. In some specimens, a previous lip is visible on the final whorl. The apertural margin is planar in lateral view, with a moderate anterior projection near the canal. A ventrolateral varix is usually present as a thickened rib positioned approximately between 210° and 280°, although it may be weak or absent in some individuals.

Shell sculpture consists primarily of axial ribs. These ribs are straight to slightly backward-leaning on the spire and become slightly curved on the final one or two whorls. The ribs are generally prominent and rounded, with interspaces one to two times the width of the ribs. The penultimate whorl typically bears between eight and 31 axial ribs. Spiral sculpture is absent on the spire, but weak spiral ridges may develop on the final whorl, and the base bears several fine striae, one of which may form a weak keel.

The shell surface shows faint spiral microstriae on the periostracum. When worn, the ribs appear glossy. Shell coloration is usually fawn, often with one to six dark brown bands or lines above the periphery and two bands on the base. In some specimens the shell is predominantly dark brown with indistinct pale banding; the colour pattern is visible within the aperture.

The soft body is grey with pink and pale yellow markings. The snout bears transverse black lines and dark bands, with a yellow tip. Tentacles are grey with black transverse lines and a dark band across the eye. The foot is pinkish grey with darker mottling, and the mantle is grey with a cream-coloured edge. These observations are based on ethanol-preserved specimens from Sulawesi.

== Distribution ==
This species occurs in brackish waters in the Philippines and across the Indo-West Pacific region, including the Sulawesi, the Moluccas, the Lesser Sunda Islands, New Guinea, and the Solomon Islands. Its occurrence in Kalimantan (Indonesian Borneo) remains unconfirmed, although museum specimens labelled from “East Borneo” or “Southeast Borneo” exist without precise locality data.
