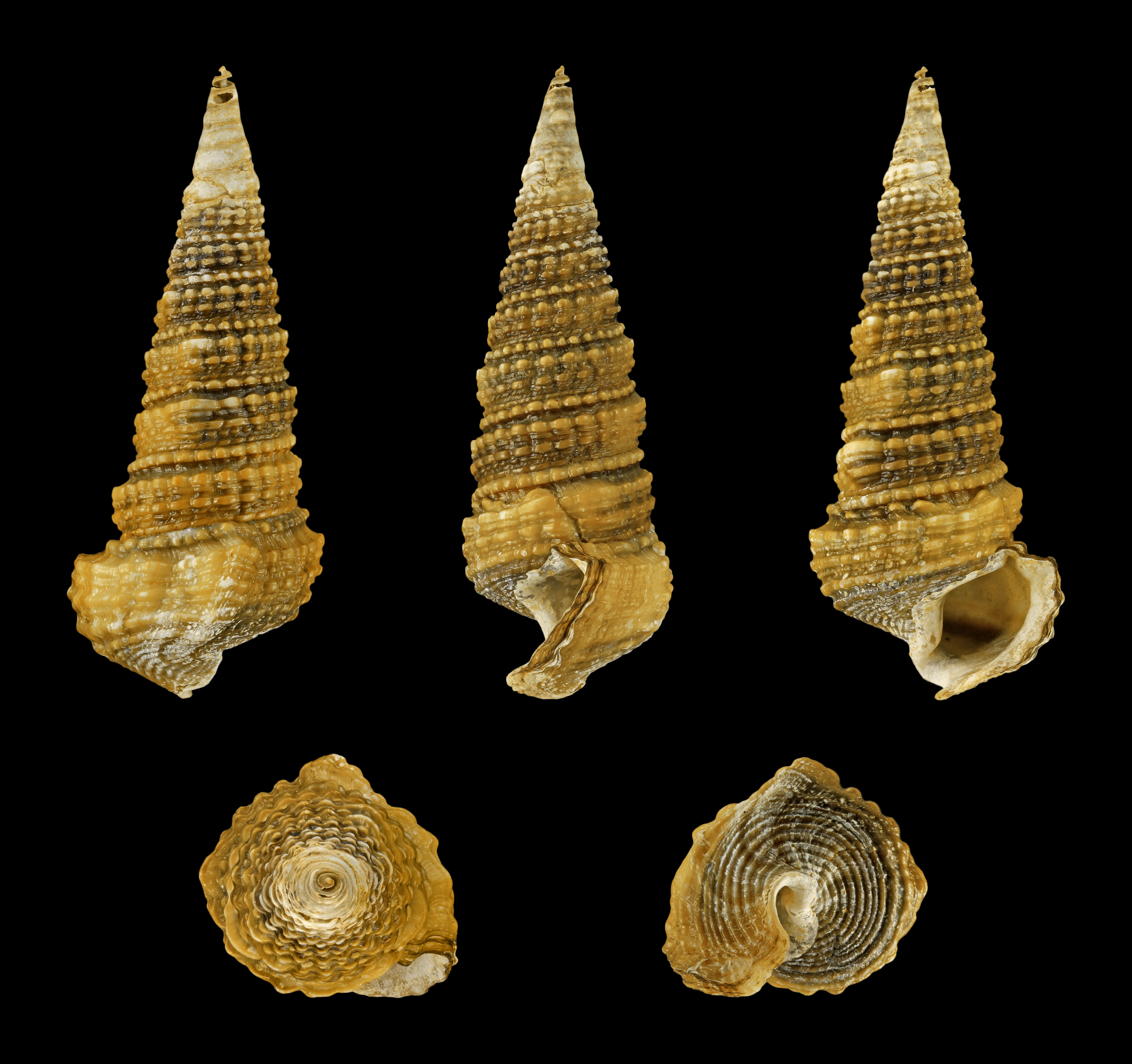
- Tympanotonos fuscatus var. radula

Conservation status
- Least Concern (IUCN 3.1)

Scientific classification
- Kingdom: Animalia
- Phylum: Mollusca
- Class: Gastropoda
- Subclass: Caenogastropoda
- Order: incertae sedis
- Family: Potamididae
- Genus: Tympanotonos; Schumacher, 1817
- Species: T. fuscatus

Binomial name
- Tympanotonos fuscatus (Linnaeus, 1758)

Synonyms
- Tympanotomus Gray, 1840; Tympanotonus Agassiz, 1846 (unjustified emendation); Tympanotomus fuscatus Linnaeus; Murex radula Linnaeus, 1758; Tympanotomus fuscatus Linnaeus (misspelled genus); Tympanotonos radula (Linnaeus, 1758); Tympanotonus fuscatus (Linnaeus, 1758) (misspelled genus); Tympanotonus granulatus (Lamarck, 1816); Tympanotonus radula (Linnaeus, 1758) (junior synonym; misspelled genus)

= Tympanotonos fuscatus =

Species of gastropod

Tympanotonos fuscatus, the West African mud creeper, is a species of snail living in brackish water, a gastropod mollusk in the family Potamididae.

Tympanotonos fuscatus is the only extant species in the genus Tympanotonos.

== Description ==
Shells of Tympanotonos fuscatus can reach a size of about 35–100 millimetres (1.4–3.9 in).

== Distribution ==
This species is found along the west coast of Africa, from Angola in the south to Senegal in the north, and also Cape Verde.
