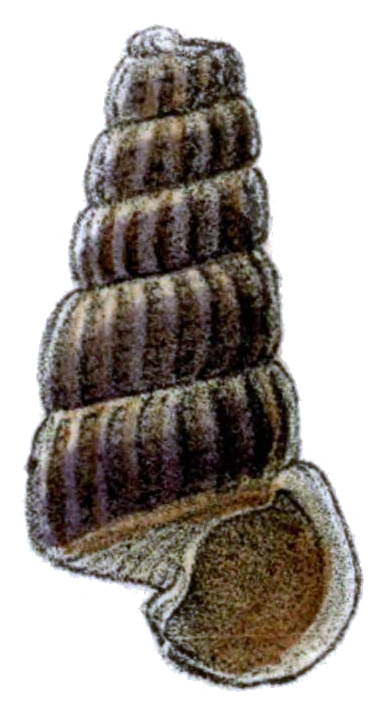
- Drawing of a shell of an adult Cerithidea decollata

Conservation status
- Least Concern (IUCN 3.1)

Scientific classification
- Kingdom: Animalia
- Phylum: Mollusca
- Class: Gastropoda
- Subclass: Caenogastropoda
- Order: incertae sedis
- Family: Potamididae
- Genus: Cerithidea
- Species: C. decollata

Binomial name
- Cerithidea decollata (Linnaeus, 1758)

Synonyms
- Potamides decollatus (Linnaeus, 1767)

= Cerithidea decollata =

Species of gastropod

Cerithidea decollata, common name the truncated mangrove snail, is a species of sea snail, a marine gastropod mollusc in the family Potamididae.

== Description ==
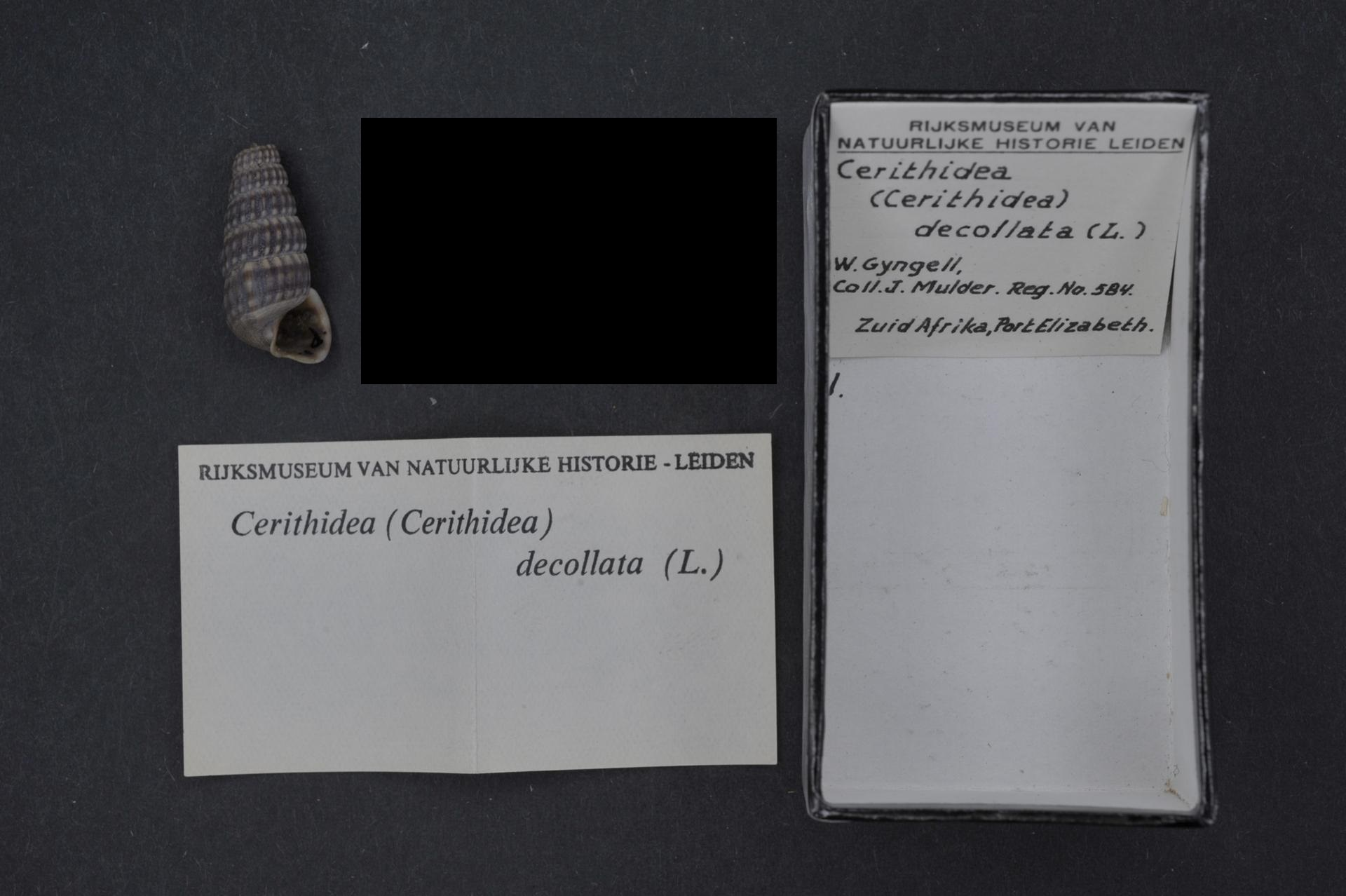
Cerithidea decollata (Linnaeus, 1767). Museum specimen. Naturalis.

Adults have a thick, approximately 3 cm long shell, with 5 whorls and around 20 axial ribs on each whirl. A distinguishing characteristic of adults is the broken-off tip of the shell, although this feature can be difficult to discern in some individuals.

== Ecology ==
This species is common in coastal mangrove forests, particularly near Avicennia marina trees, in western part of the Indian Ocean - Kenya, Tanzania, Mozambique, South Africa and Madagascar.

Juveniles are seldom seen and therefore little is known about their ecology. The adults feed on small organic particles (detritus) and seagrasses that are brought in with the tide. Their habitat is a gently sloping intertidal zone with two high and two low tides each day. There are large differences in the duration of flooding and sea level between the two high tides each day, between seasons and between places nearer to or further from the shoreline.

== Tree-climbing behaviour ==
When the water recedes, the snails feed scattered on the ground. Then, one or two hours before the incoming tide, they start climbing on tree trunks and gather in groups of up to several dozen specimens, waiting above the water level until the sea recedes again. This behaviour probably makes it possible for them to avoid the unfavorable physiological effects of submersion, or possibly makes it easier to escape from marine predators such as crabs. Similar or reverse tree-climbing strategy is employed by other related species.

The strategy of this particular species is unusual, because the tides are very unpredictable in this environment. The higher and lower semidiurnal tides vary in amplitude, and during neap tide, one or both high tides each day are not high enough to reach the grounds where the snails feed. The snails start climbing when the shoreline is still dozens of meters away and an hour or two before the water floods their feeding grounds. They invariably stop at a point twenty to seventy centimeters above the future water level and wait there for the tide. If the incoming high tide is too low to reach their feeding grounds, they remain on the ground until an hour before the next high tide will be high enough (especially the animals that live further inland where the shore is a bit higher and therefore more seldom flooded).

It has been found out that the individuals "measure" their height by detecting the amount of energy used for climbing: when artificially loaded, the snails climbed proportionally lower, whereas they climbed higher if the tree trunk was replaced with a smoother surface or if the researchers raised the starting platform. However, it is still a puzzle how the animals are able to predict the water level so far in advance. The difference in body weight caused by the fluctuation of gravity that also causes the tide is probably too low for detection by an organism this small. Chemical cues, such as hydrogen sulfide released from the ground, and acoustic cues, such as infrasound caused by the waves, are probably unreliable indicators of the water level as well, because of the local weather's influence. Every high tide is similar in amplitude to the one before the last, but the snail migration is – statistically speaking – better adjusted to the following high tide than to the one before the last. The underlying process is probably regulated by an internal clock, which can be "confused" by carrying an individual to a lower or a higher part of the coastline. In this case, the animal continues to climb as it would in its original surrounding for several more days or until it gets submerged, then the mechanism "resets" and it is again able to predict the oncoming high tide reliably. Since the cue used by these animals to predict the level of the incoming high tide is still a complete mystery, researchers jest that these snails can foresee the future.
