= Cerithidea anticipata =

Scientific classification
- Kingdom: Animalia
- Phylum: Mollusca
- Class: Gastropoda
- Subclass: Caenogastropoda
- Order: incertae sedis
- Family: Potamididae
- Genus: Cerithidea
- Species: C. anticipata

Binomial name
- Cerithidea anticipata Iredale, 1929

Species of gastropod

Cerithidea anticipata is a species of sea snail, a marine gastropod mollusk in the family Potamididae.
