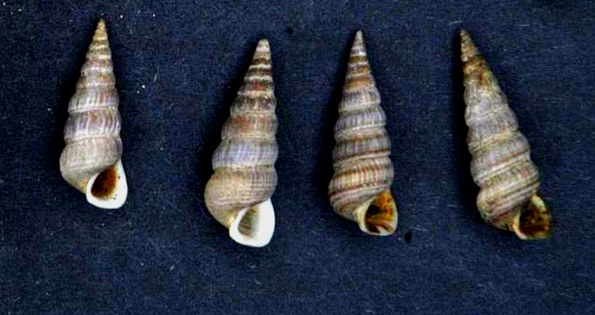
- Four shells of Cerithideopsis pliculosa (museum specimens at Naturalis Biodiversity Center)

Scientific classification
- Kingdom: Animalia
- Phylum: Mollusca
- Class: Gastropoda
- Subclass: Caenogastropoda
- Order: incertae sedis
- Family: Potamididae
- Genus: Cerithideopsis
- Species: C. pliculosa

Binomial name
- Cerithideopsis pliculosa (Menke, 1829)

Synonyms
- Cerithidea pliculosa (Menke, 1829); Cerithium mascarenarum Kobelt, 1893; Cerithium natalense Kobelt, 1893; Cerithium pliculosum Menke, 1829 (original combination); Potamides iostomus L. Pfeiffer, 1839

= Cerithideopsis pliculosa =

Species of gastropod

Cerithideopsis pliculosa, common name the plicate horn shell, is a species of sea snail, a marine gastropod mollusk in the family Potamididae.

== Distribution ==
The species is found on the Caribbean coast of the US. It is genetically distinct from Cerithideopsis californica of the Pacific coast of the US. The two species became isolated by the emergence of the Isthmus of Panama three million years ago. DNA analysis suggests that there was some crossing of the Isthmus in both directions, and the common shorebirds called willets are suspected as carriers. Willet droppings have been placed in dishes of salt water with the result that some snails hatched out.

== Description ==
The maximum recorded shell length is 33 mm.

== Habitat ==
The species has been found in water at recorded depths from 0 to 2 m.
