= Masak lemak lada api =

Malaysian spicy curry dish from Negeri Sembilan

Masak lemak lada api ماسق لمق لاد اڤي
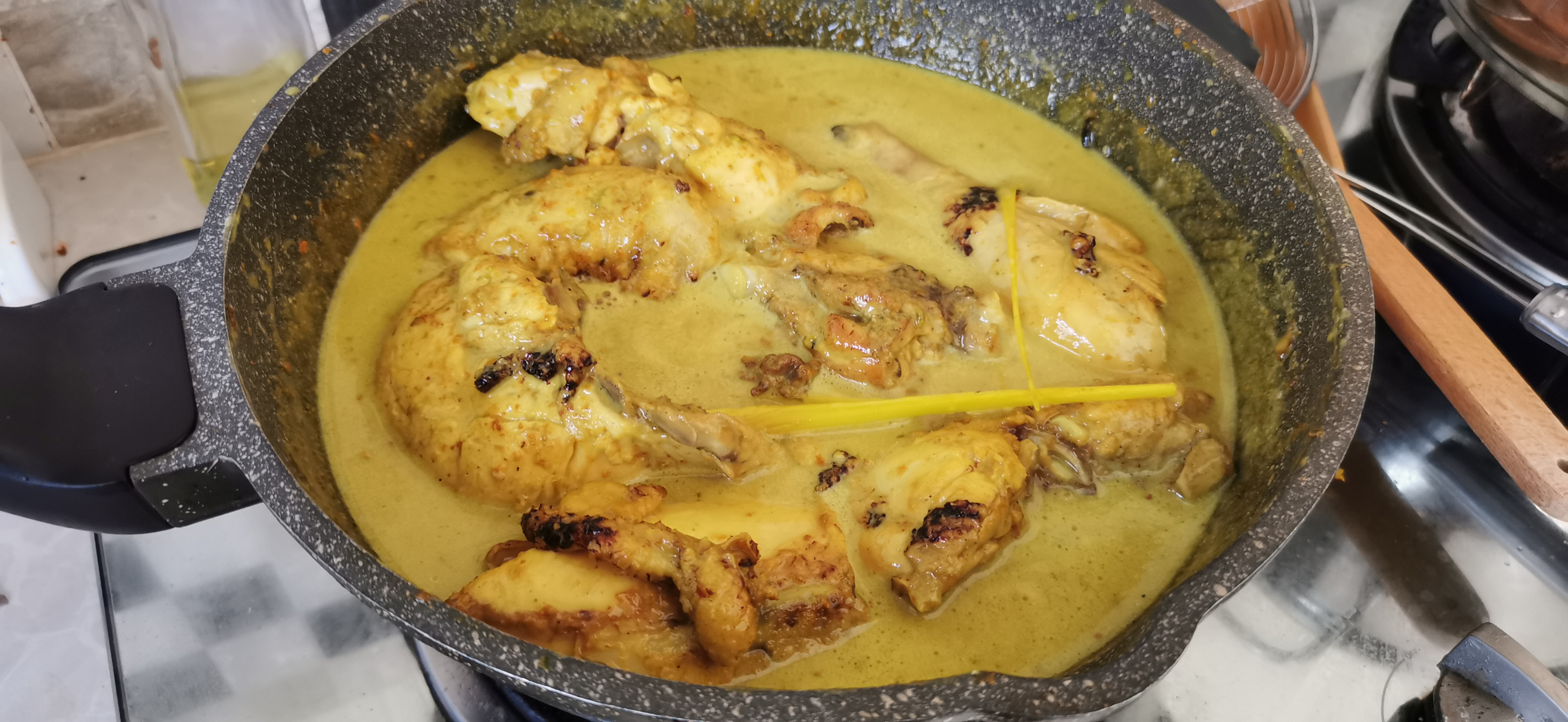
- Ayam salai masak lemak lada api (with smoked chicken)
- Alternative names: Gulai kuning, masak lemak cili api
- Type: Gulai
- Course: Main
- Place of origin: Malaysia
- Region or state: Negeri Sembilan, also popular in northern Malacca
- Created by: Negeri Sembilan Malays
- Serving temperature: Hot
- Main ingredients: Chilli pepper (Bird's eye or C. frutescens), coconut milk, turmeric, lemongrass, vegetables, meats and offal of choice
- Variations: With locusts With seafood With onions (in Johor)

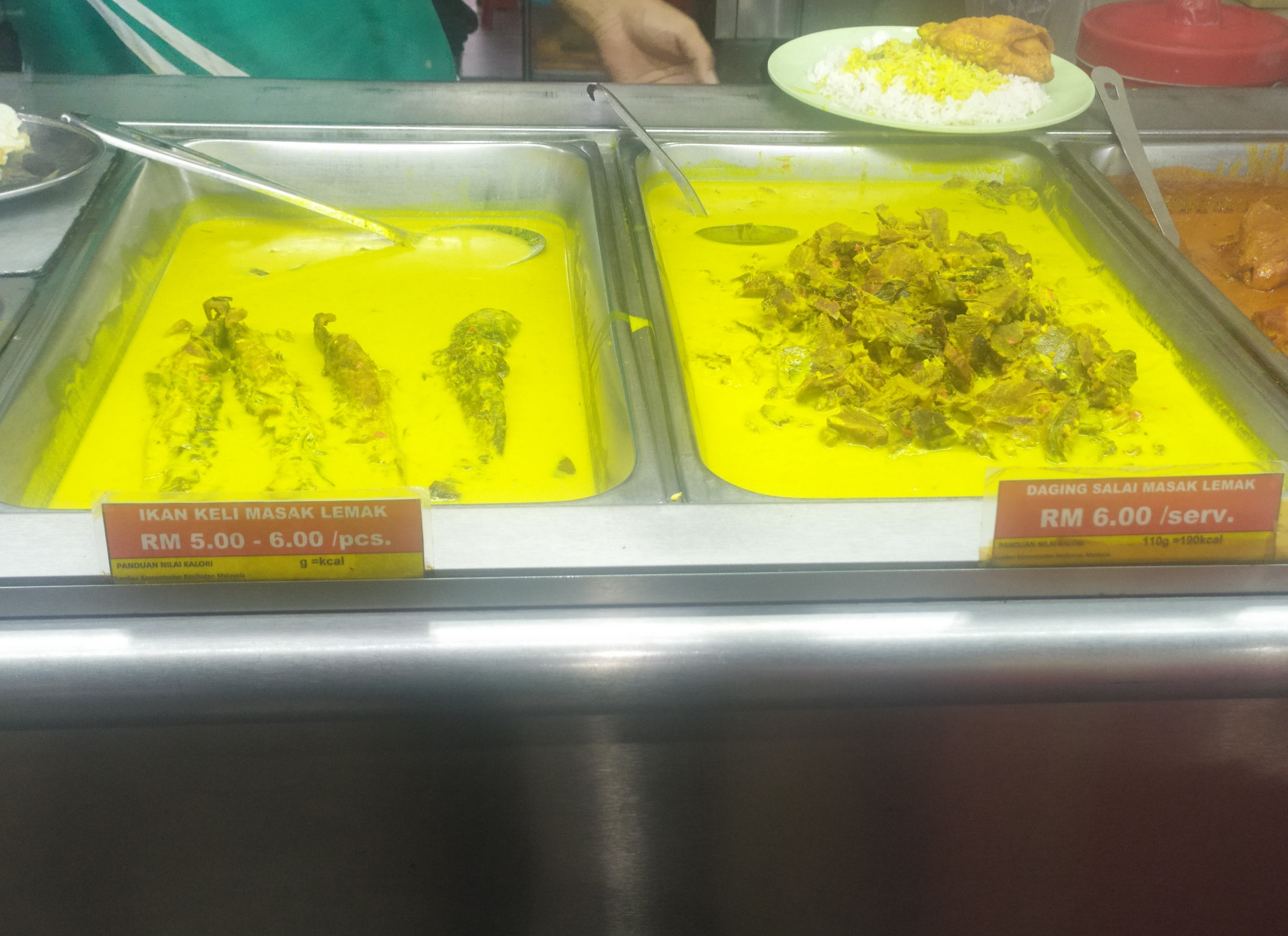
Masak lemak lada api being displayed at a layby food court in Nilai. With catfish (left), with smoked beef (right).

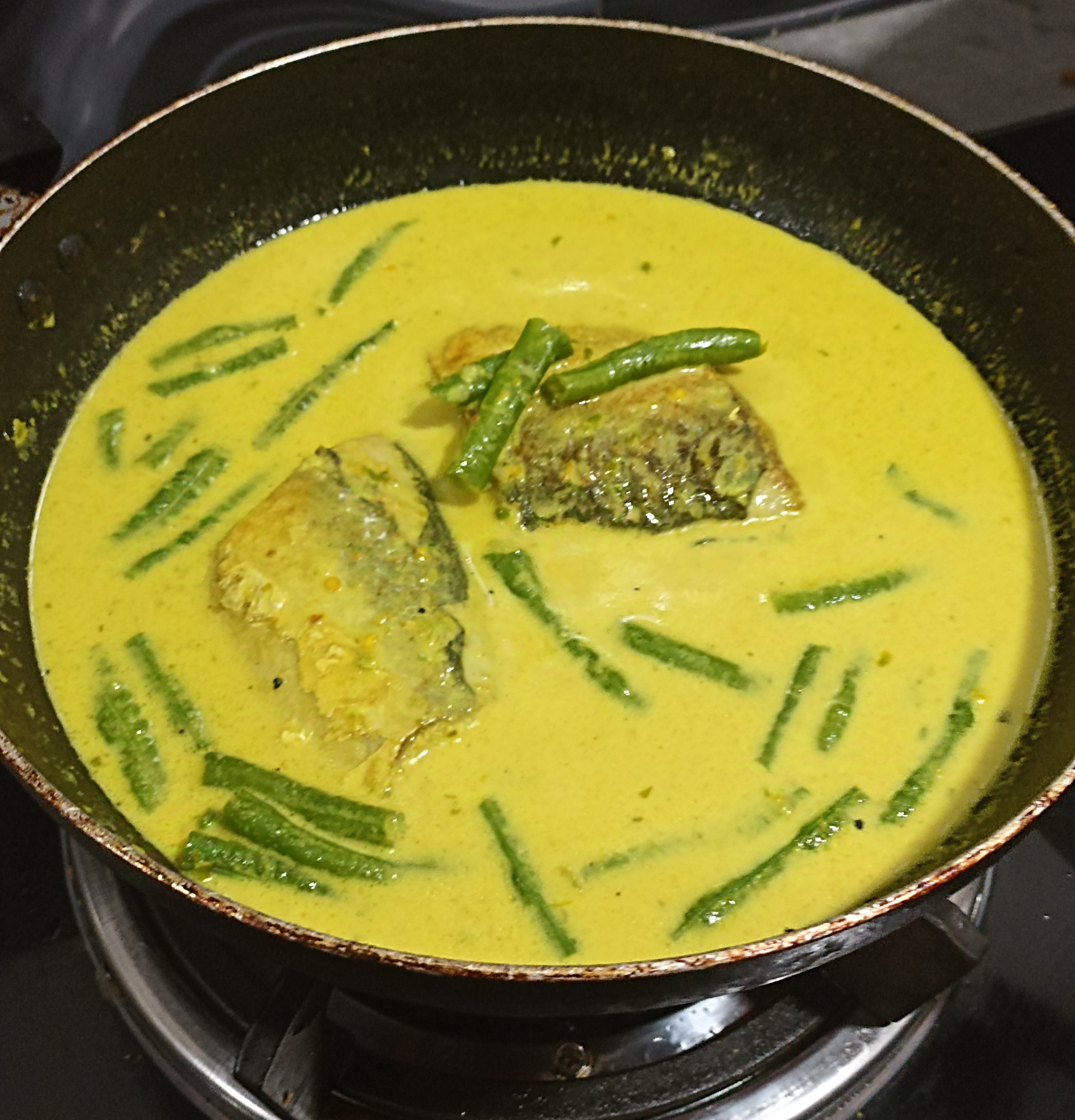
Ikan parang masak lemak lada api, with dorab wolf-herring as the main ingredient.

Masak lemak lada api (Negeri Sembilan Malay: Masak lomak lado api or Saklomak; Jawi: ماسق لمق لاد اڤي), also known as gulai kuning (lit. 'yellow gulai'), is a Malaysian dish originating in the state of Negeri Sembilan.

Masak lemak lada api is a pungent and rich gulai that is often hailed as the most defining dish in traditional Negri cuisine, infamously known for its immense spiciness, where it has been well established as a staple in Negri households and in restaurants specialising in Negri fare throughout Negeri Sembilan and nationwide.

Masak lemak lada api is also popular in northern Malacca, especially in Alor Gajah District, whose population mainly speak Negeri Sembilan Malay.

== Preparation ==
In the original Negri rendition of the dish, the spice base calls for a generous amount of chili peppers, normally either bird's eye (c. annuum) or c. frutescens – and turmeric, mixed with liberal quantities of coconut milk on a simmering heat. The turmeric gives the dish its signature vibrant yellowish green hue. It is cooked with a variety of meats, usually poultry (including their eggs), beef, mutton, and sometimes venison, which are added straight up or cured by smoking. Like their distant kindred in West Sumatra, the Negeri Sembilanese also integrate their fondness of offal in the cooking process, the popular types being brains, cowhide, tripe, spleen and intestines. Seafoods like prawns and siput sedut are also a popular addition in the preparation of the dish. Complementary vegetables often include potatoes, pucuk paku, edible mushrooms, unripe jackfruit flesh, unripe horse mango, and bamboo shoots. It is best served with hot cooked rice, paired with a side of ulam-ulaman, sambal and other accompaniments.

In the state of Johor, the spice base for masak lemak lada api include onions.

== Gallery ==
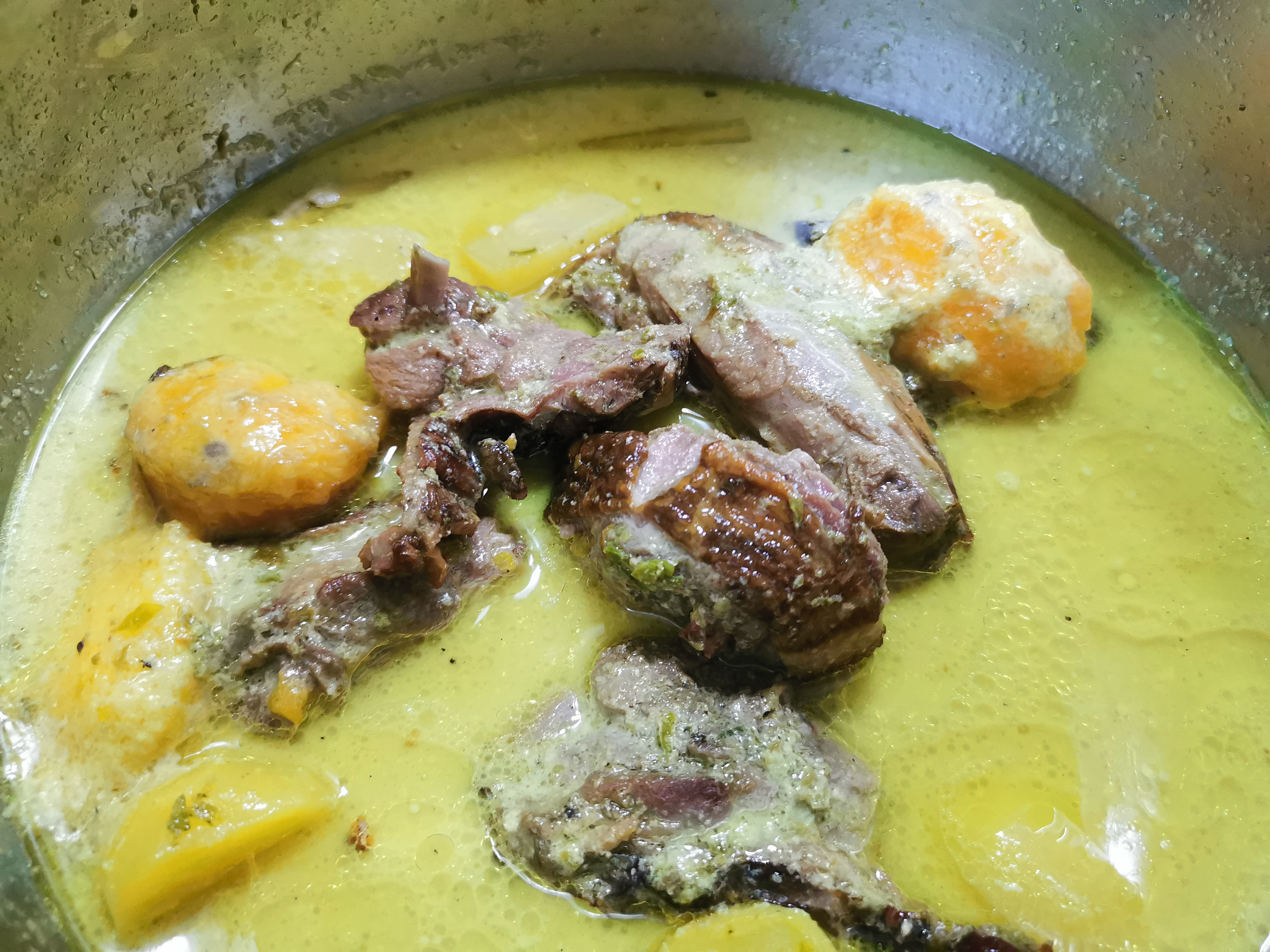
With smoked duck and unripe mangoes

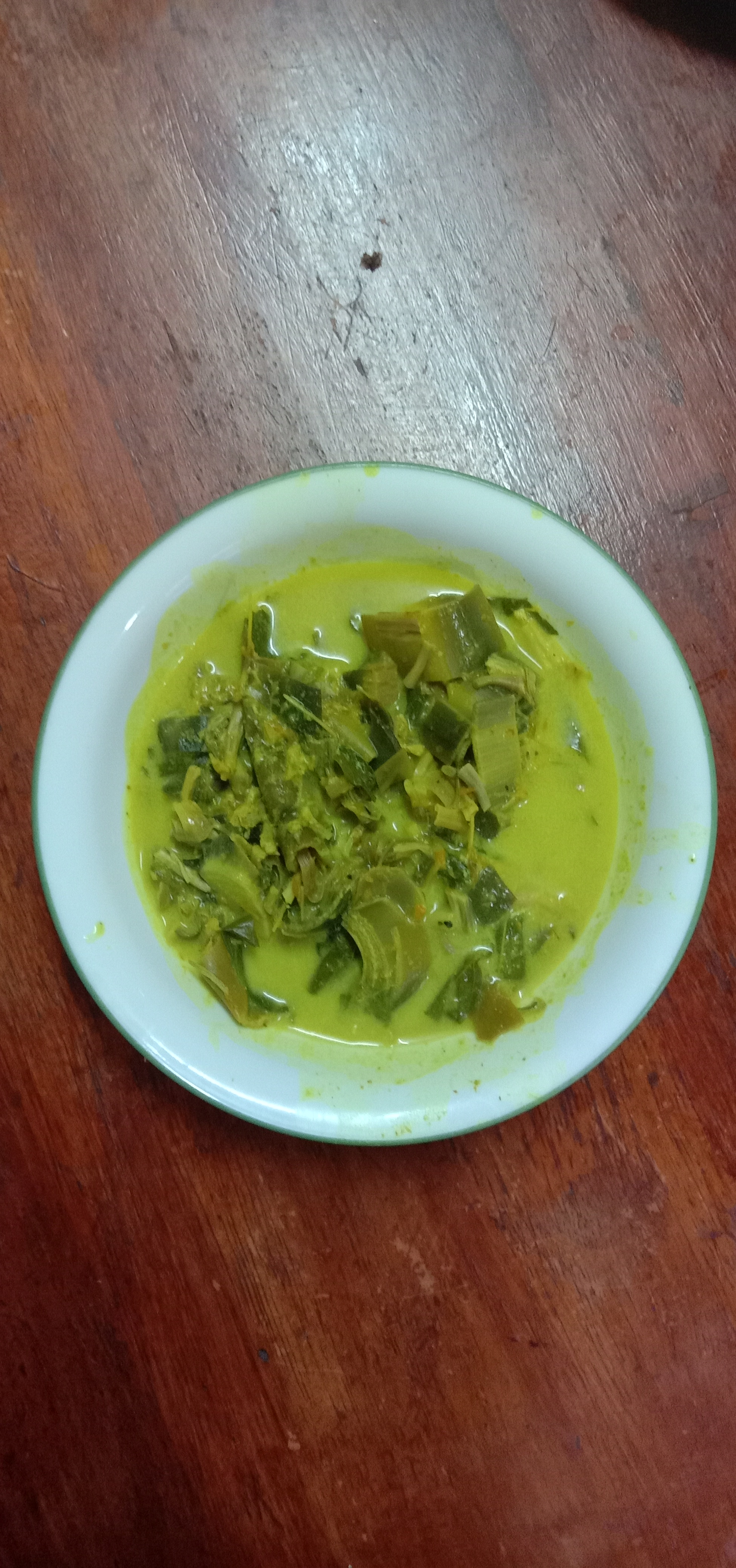
With banana blossom

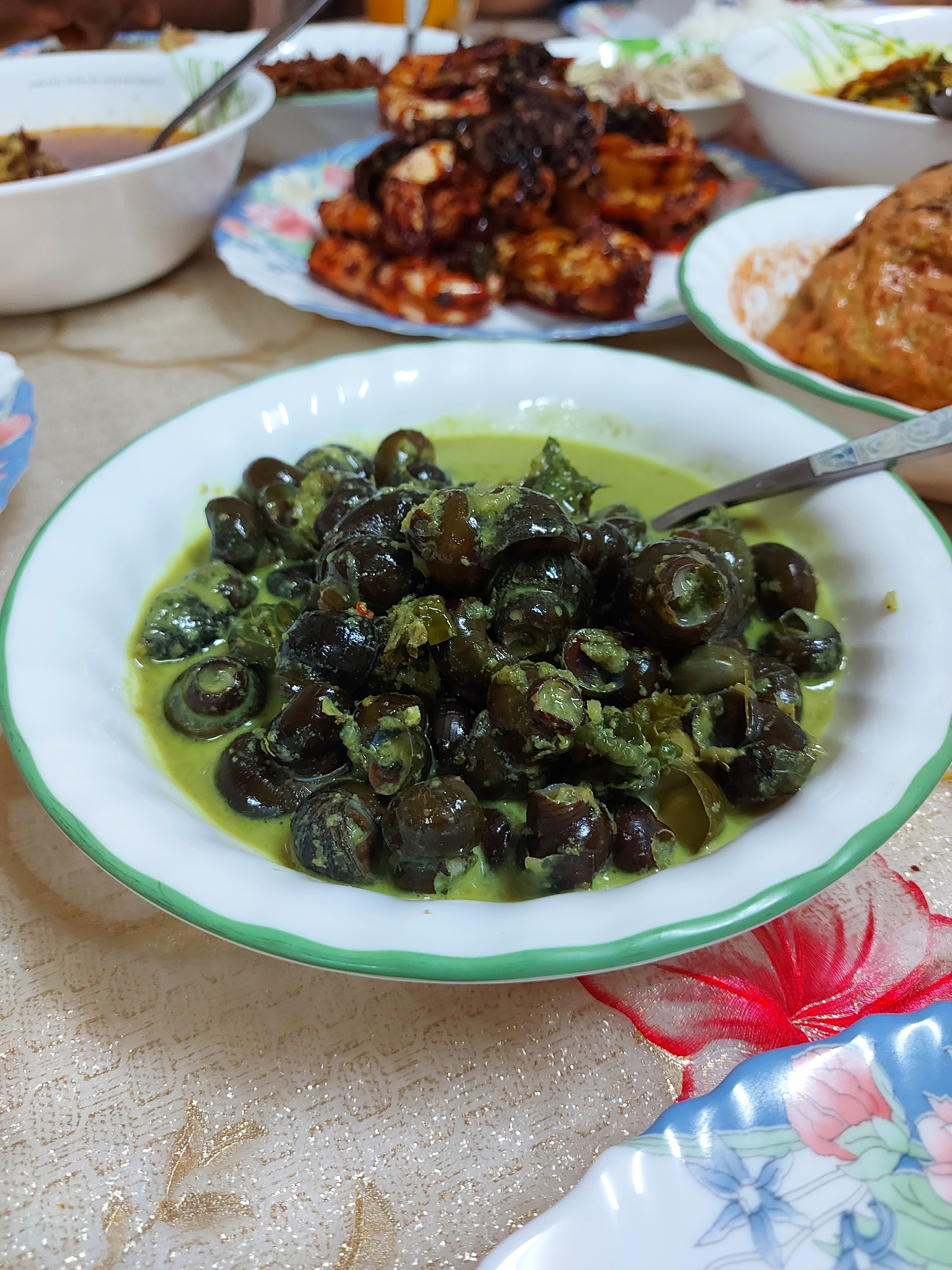
With Cerithidea obtusa

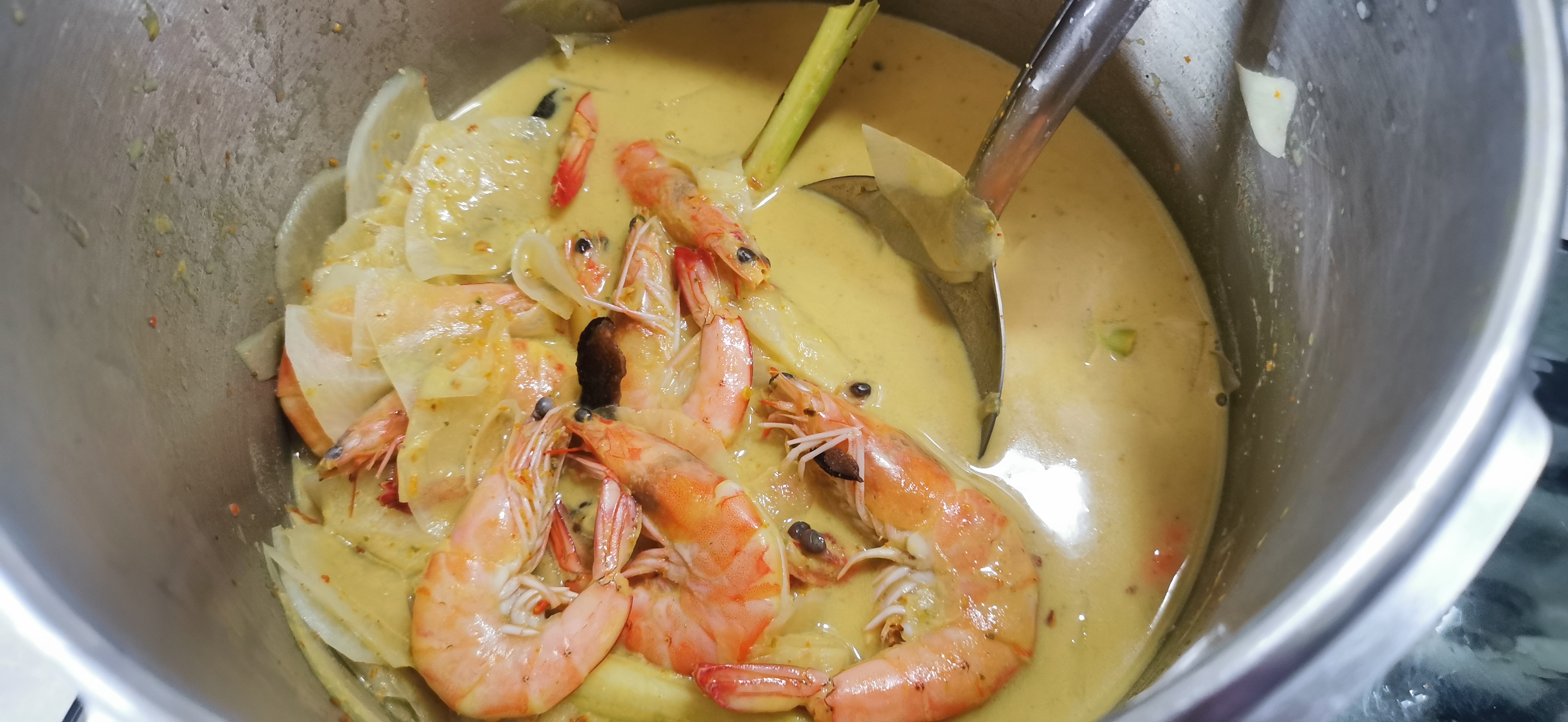
With prawns

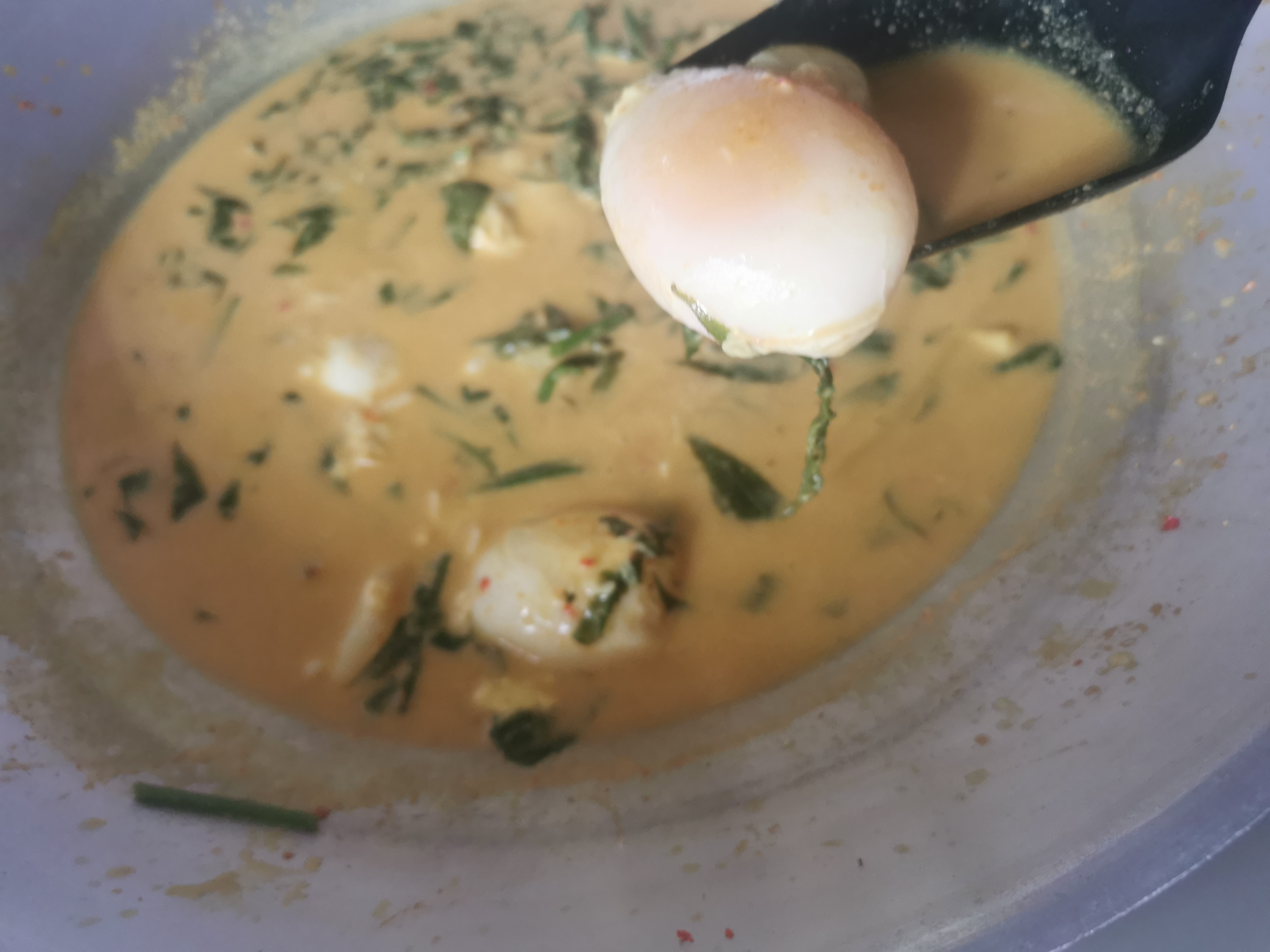
With hard-boiled duck eggs

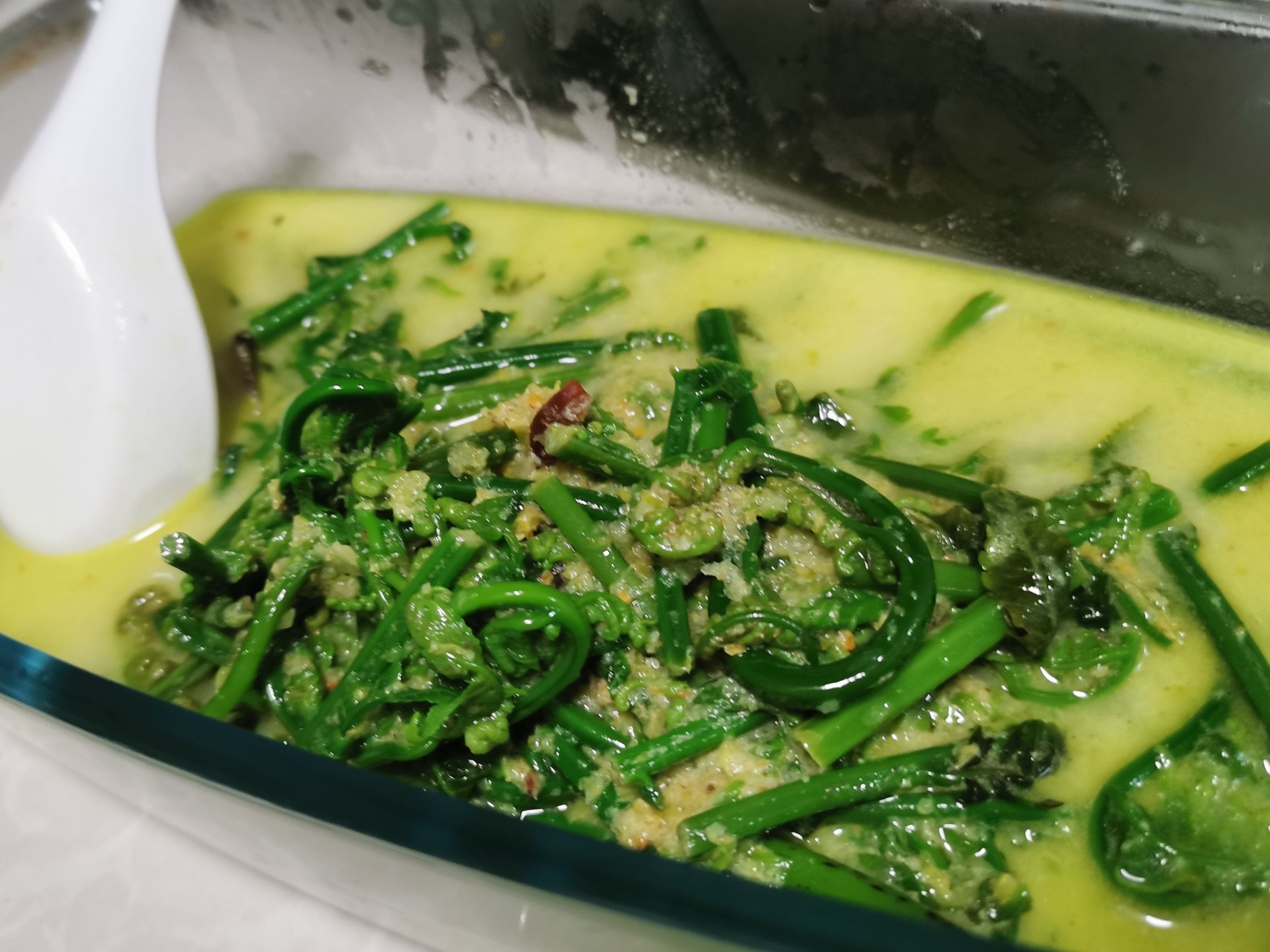
With ferns

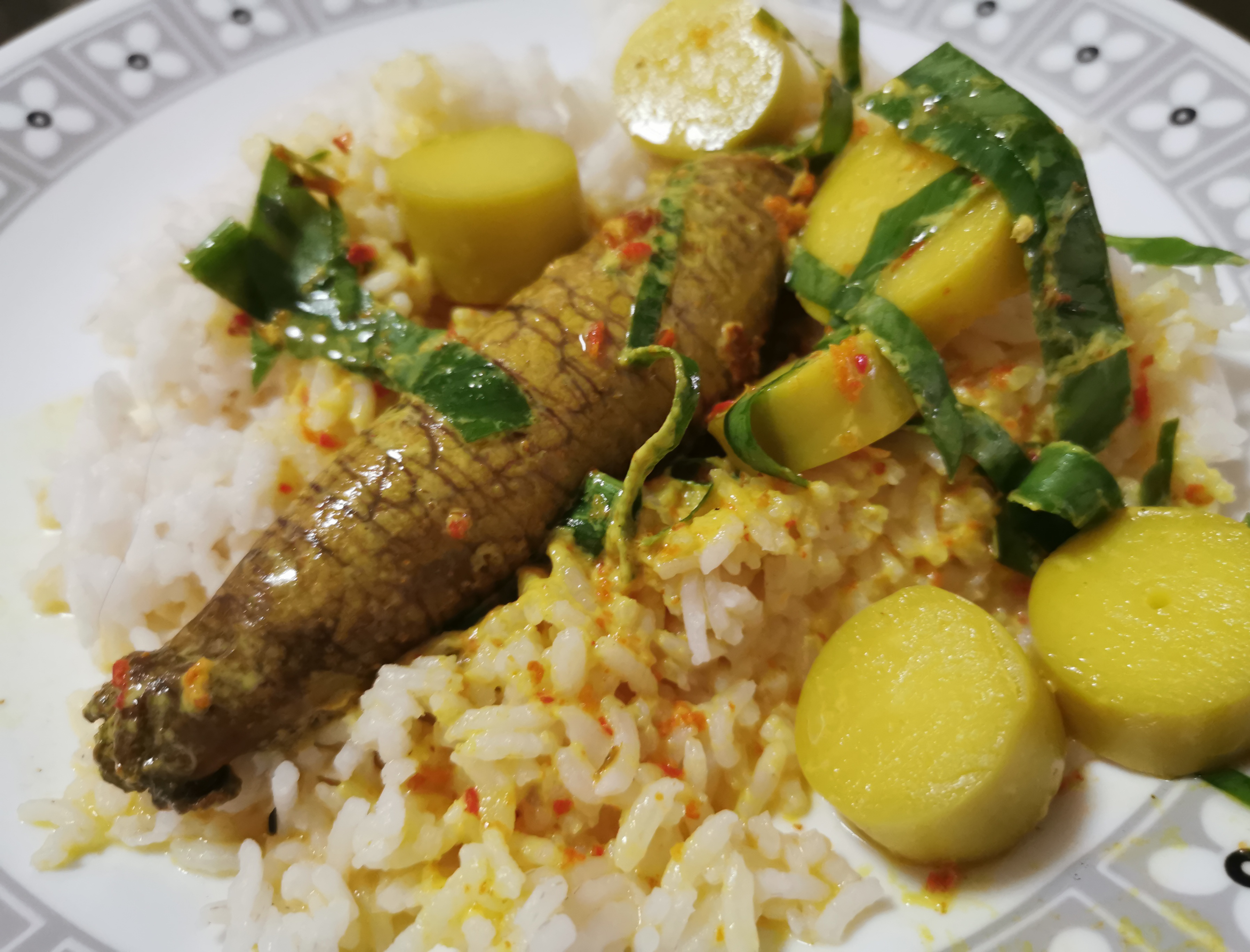
Roe and bamboo shoots masak lemak lada api served on a bed of cooked rice.

== See also ==
- Asam pedas
- Thai green curry
