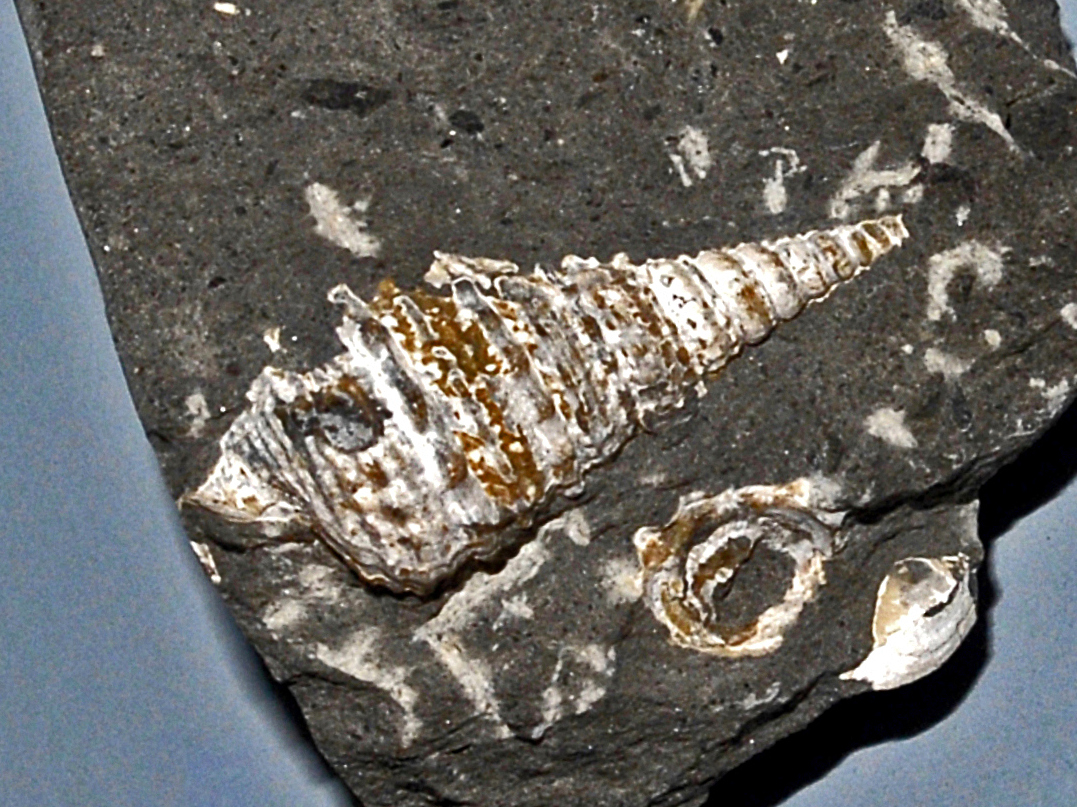
- Fossil shell of Tympanotonus margaritaceum

Scientific classification
- Kingdom: Animalia
- Phylum: Mollusca
- Class: Gastropoda
- Subclass: Caenogastropoda
- Order: incertae sedis
- Family: Potamididae
- Genus: Tympanotonos; Schumacher, 1817

Synonyms
- Potamides (Tympanotonus) Agassiz, 1846; Tympanotomus Gray, 1840; † Tympanotonos (Eotympanotonus) Chavan, 1952 · accepted, alternate representation; Tympanotonus Agassiz, 1846 (unjustified emendation)

= Tympanotonos =

Tympanotonos Temporal range: Cretaceous - Recent

Genus of gastropods

Tympanotonos is a genus of snail living in brackish water, a gastropod mollusk in the family Potamididae.

== Extant and extinct species ==
Species within this genus include:

- † Tympanotonus calcaratus (Grateloup, 1840)
- † Tympanotonus conarius (Bayan, 1873)
- Tympanotonos fuscatus (Linnaeus, 1758) (the only extant species)
- † Tympanotonus margaritaceum (Brongniart)
- † Tympanotonos redoniensis Van Dingenen, Ceulemans & Landau, 2016
- † Tympanotonus semperi (Deshaye, 1864)
- † Tympanotonos stroppus Brongniart 1823

Fossils species within this genus can be found in sediment of Europe, United States, South Africa, Japan, Venezuela and Indonesia from Cretaceous to Quaternary (age range: 84.9 to 0.012 Ma).
