= Catatropis =

Scientific classification
- Kingdom: Animalia
- Phylum: Platyhelminthes
- Class: Trematoda
- Order: Plagiorchiida
- Family: Notocotylidae
- Genus: Catatropis; Odhner, 1905

Genus of flatworms

Catatropis is a genus of trematodes belonging to the family Notocotylidae.

The species of this genus are found in Europe, America, Australia.

Species:

- Catatropis chilinae
- Catatropis cygni Yamaguti, 1939
- Catatropis harwoodi Bullock, 1952
- Catatropis hatcheri
- Catatropis hisikui Yamaguti, 1934
- Catatropis johnstoni Martin, 1956
- Catatropis lagunae Bayssade-Dufour, Albaret, Fermet-Quinet & Farhati, 1996
- Catatropis pacifera Noble, 1933
- Catatropis verrucosa (Fröhlich, 1789)
