= Cerithideopsis largillierti =

Scientific classification
- Kingdom: Animalia
- Phylum: Mollusca
- Class: Gastropoda
- Subclass: Caenogastropoda
- Order: incertae sedis
- Family: Potamididae
- Genus: Cerithideopsis
- Species: C. largillierti

Binomial name
- Cerithideopsis largillierti (Philippi, 1848)

Synonyms
- Cerithidea fortunei A. Adams, 1855; Cerithidea largillierti (Philippi, 1848); Cerithium (Potamides) largillierti Philippi, 1848 (basionym); Cerithium largillierti Philippi, 1848 (original combination)

Species of gastropod

Cerithideopsis largillierti is a species of sea snail, a marine gastropod mollusk in the family Potamididae.
