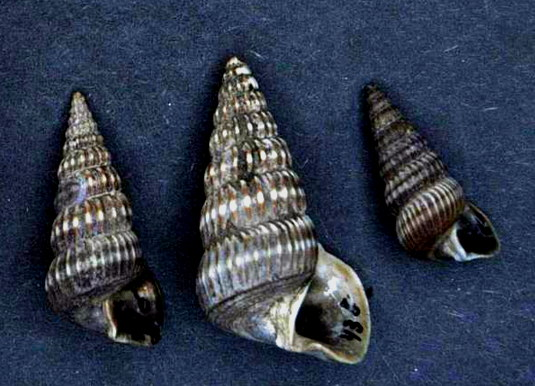
- Three shells of Cerithideopsis montagnei (museum specimens at Naturalis Biodiversity Center)

Scientific classification
- Kingdom: Animalia
- Phylum: Mollusca
- Class: Gastropoda
- Subclass: Caenogastropoda
- Order: incertae sedis
- Family: Potamididae
- Genus: Cerithideopsis
- Species: C. montagnei

Binomial name
- Cerithideopsis montagnei (d’Orbigny, 1839)

Synonyms
- Cerithidea montagnei (d'Orbigny, 1841); Cerithium montagnei d’Orbigny, 1841 (original combination)

= Cerithideopsis montagnei =

Species of gastropod

Cerithideopsis montagnei is a species of sea snail, a marine gastropod mollusk in the family Potamididae.

== Distribution ==
This marine species occurs in the Caribbean Sea off Panama.
