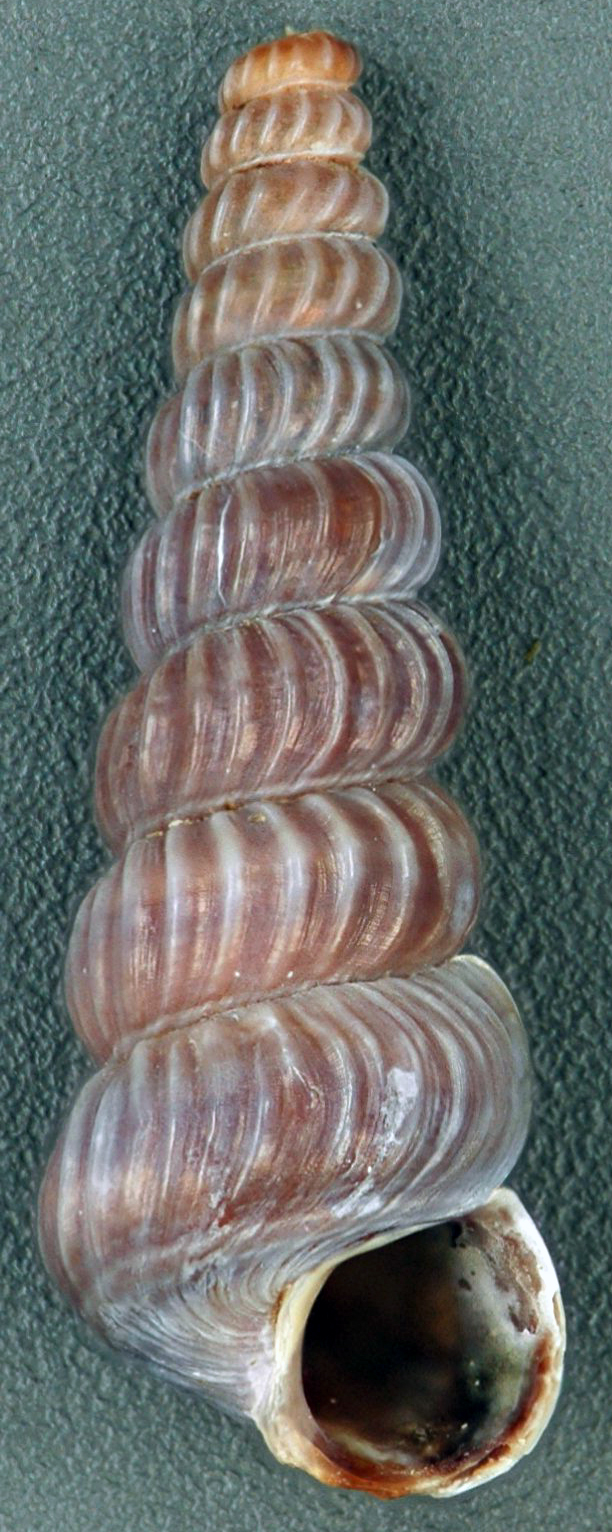
- Cerithidea costata (costate horn snail) shell

Scientific classification
- Kingdom: Animalia
- Phylum: Mollusca
- Class: Gastropoda
- Subclass: Caenogastropoda
- Order: incertae sedis
- Family: Potamididae
- Genus: Cerithideopsis
- Species: C. costata

Binomial name
- Cerithideopsis costata (da Costa, 1778)

Synonyms
- Cerithidea costata (da Costa, 1778); Cerithidea costata beattyi Bequaert, 1942; Cerithidea hanleyana G. B. Sowerby II, 1866; Cerithium ambiguum C.B. Adams, 1845; Cerithium lafondii Michaud, 1829; Cerithium salmacidum Morelet, 1849; Strombiformis costatus da Costa, 1778 (original combination); Strombus turboformis Montagu, 1808

= Cerithideopsis costata =

Species of gastropod

Cerithideopsis costata is a species of small sea snail, a marine gastropod mollusk in the family Potamididae.

== Distribution ==
This marine species occurs in the Caribbean Sea and the Gulf of Mexico.

== Description ==
The maximum recorded shell length is 21 mm.

== Habitat ==
The species has been found in water at recorded depths from 0 to 402 m.
