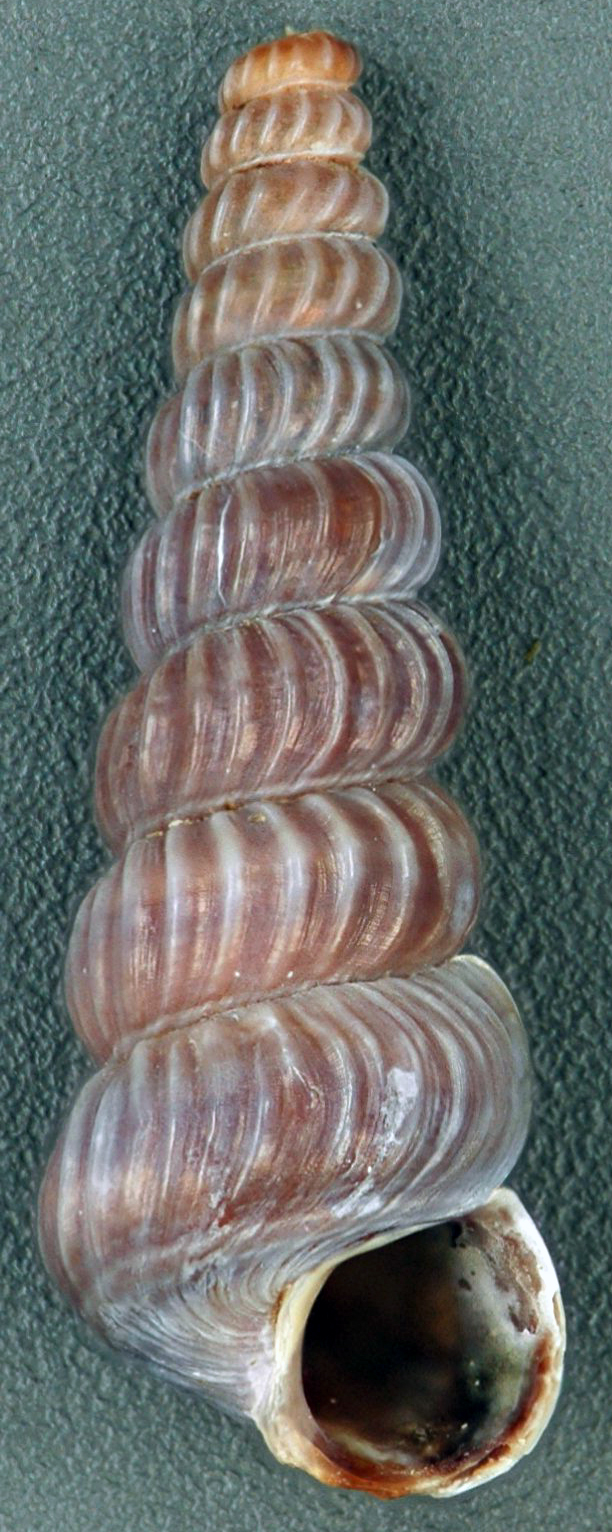
- Cerithideopsis costata shell

Scientific classification
- Kingdom: Animalia
- Phylum: Mollusca
- Class: Gastropoda
- Subclass: Caenogastropoda
- Order: incertae sedis
- Superfamily: Cerithioidea
- Family: Potamididae
- Genus: Cerithideopsis; Thiele, 1929

Type species
- Potamides iostomus L. Pfeiffer, 1839

= Cerithideopsis =

Genus of gastropods

Cerithideopsis is a genus of medium-sized sea snails or mud snails, marine gastropod mollusks in the family Potamididae, the horn snails.

This genus was previously considered a subspecies of Cerithidea Swainson, 1840

== Species ==
- Cerithideopsis australiensis Reid & Claremont, 2014
- Cerithideopsis californica (Haldeman, 1840) - California hornsnail
- Cerithideopsis costata (E. M. da Costa, 1778) - costate hornsnail
- Cerithideopsis fuscata (Gould, 1857)
- Cerithideopsis largillierti (Philippi, 1848)
- Cerithideopsis malayensis Reid & Claremont, 2014
- Cerithideopsis montagnei (Orbigny, 1839)<!--1837 per ITIS-->
- Cerithideopsis pliculosa (Menke, 1829) - plicate hornsnail - type species of genus Cerithideopsis
- Cerithideopsis pulchra (C. B. Adams, 1852)
- Cerithideopsis scalariformis (Say, 1825) - ladder hornsnail
