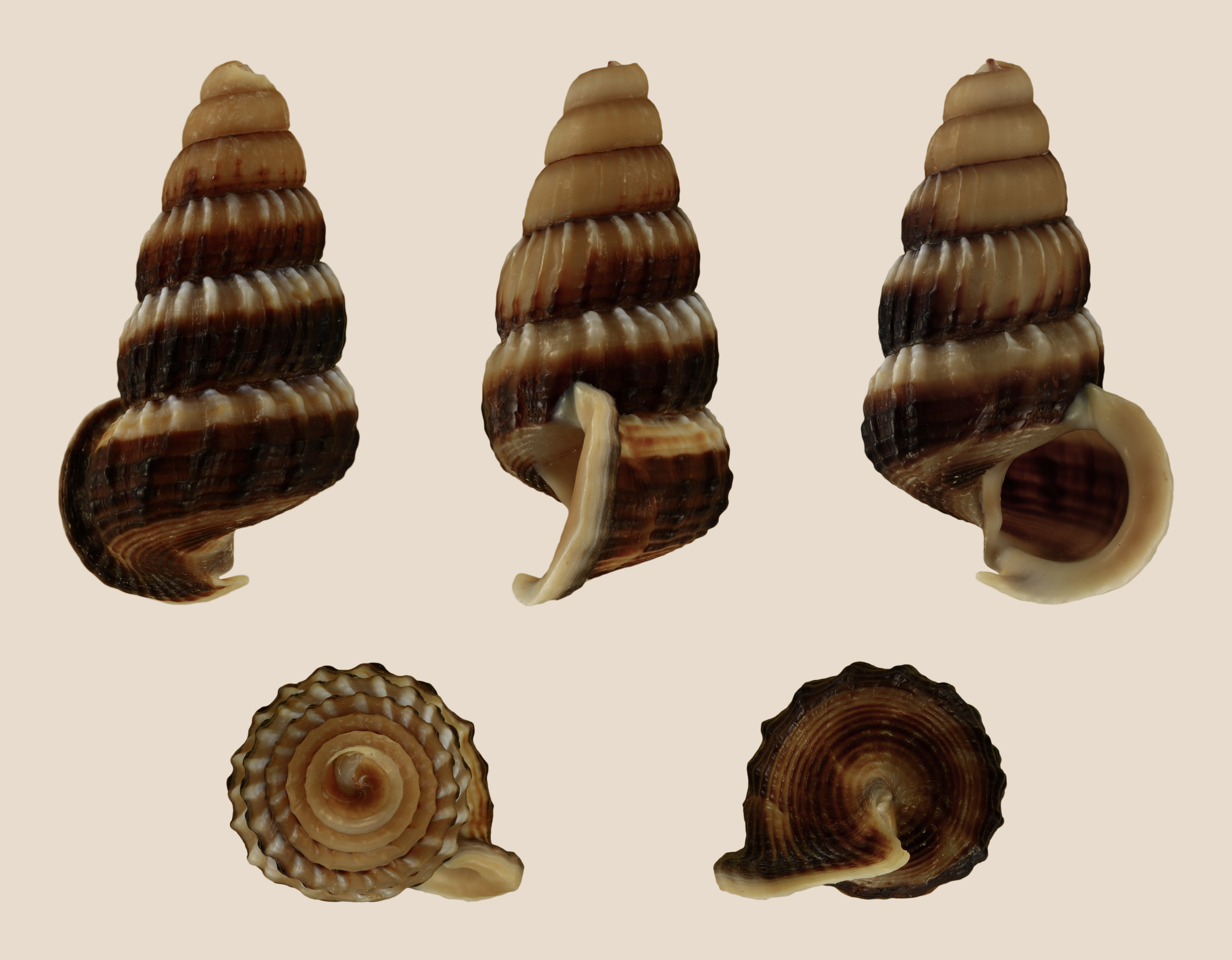

Scientific classification
- Kingdom: Animalia
- Phylum: Mollusca
- Class: Gastropoda
- Subclass: Caenogastropoda
- Order: incertae sedis
- Family: Potamididae
- Genus: Cerithidea
- Species: C. obtusa

Binomial name
- Cerithidea obtusa (Lamarck, 1822)

Synonyms
- Potamides obtusus (Lamarck, 1822)

= Cerithidea obtusa =

Species of gastropod

Cerithidea obtusa, also known as obtuse horn shell and mud creeper (Malay: siput belitung or siput sedut, Thai: หอยจุ๊บแจง or romanized: Hoi Joob Jaeng, and Vietnamese: Ốc Len) is a species of sea snail, a marine gastropod mollusk in the family Potamididae. It is a relatively common snail found in muddy coastal areas. It grows to around 5–6 cm.

It is commonly served as a dish in southeast Asia, particularly in Malaysia, southern Thailand, certain parts of Indonesia, and Vietnam.
