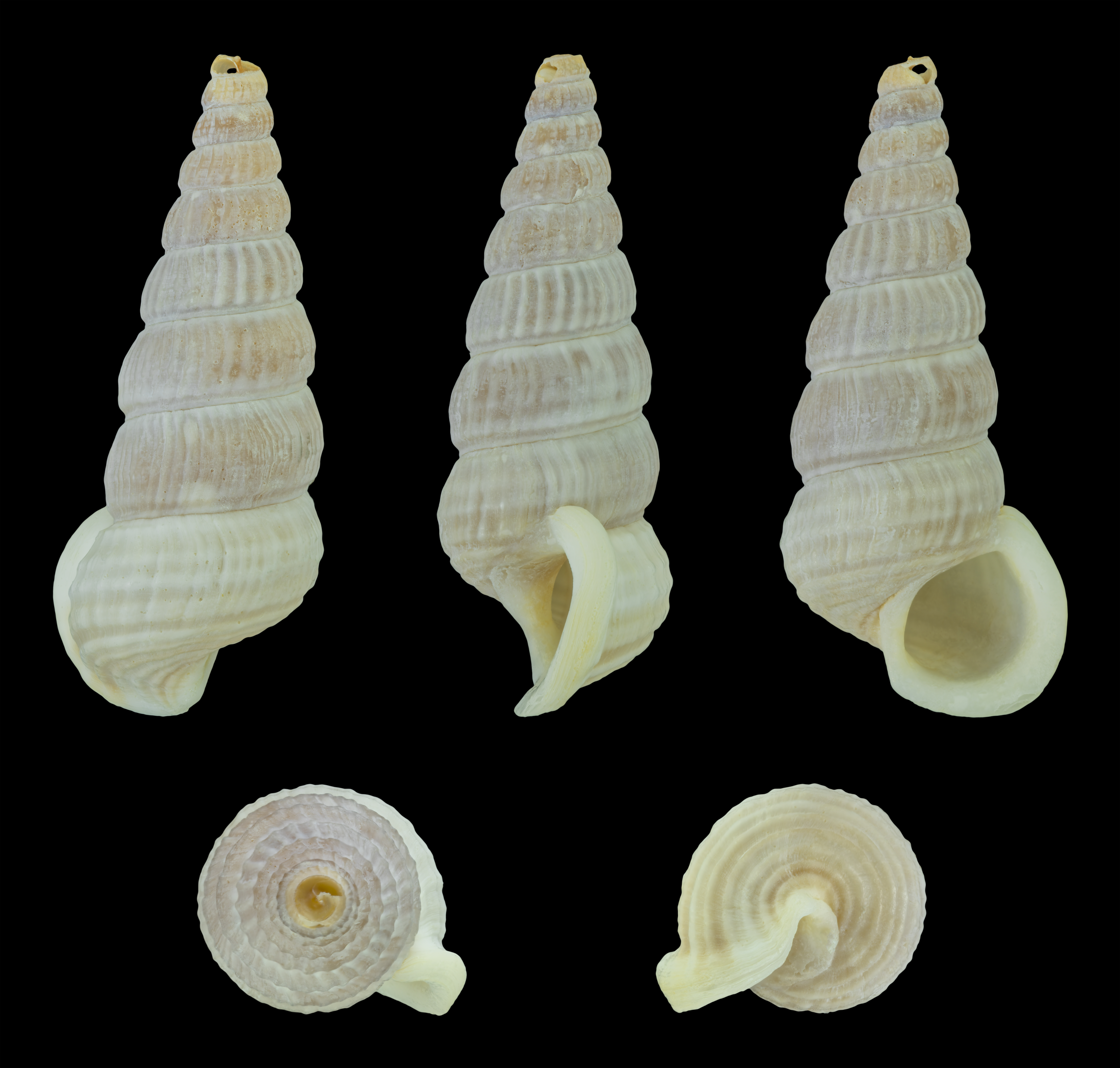

Scientific classification
- Kingdom: Animalia
- Phylum: Mollusca
- Class: Gastropoda
- Subclass: Caenogastropoda
- Order: incertae sedis
- Family: Potamididae
- Genus: Cerithideopsis
- Species: C. scalariformis

Binomial name
- Cerithideopsis scalariformis (Say, 1825)

Synonyms
- Cerithidea scalariformis (Say, 1825); Cerithidea rollei Kobelt, 1890; Cerithidea scalariformis (Say, 1825); Cerithium inaequisculptum Kobelt, 1893; Cerithium rissoideum G.B. Sowerby II, 1855; Pirena scalariformis Say, 1825

= Cerithideopsis scalariformis =

Species of gastropod

Cerithideopsis scalariformis, commonly known as the ladder hornsnail, is a species of sea snail, a marine gastropod mollusk in the family Potamididae. This amphibious species occurs in the western Atlantic Ocean, the Caribbean Sea and the Gulf of Mexico. The maximum recorded shell length is 33 mm (1.3 in).

== Description ==
Like other members of its genus, the ladder hornsnail has an elongated, spirally coiled shell. The radula, the rasping structure used in feeding, lacks cusps on the underside of its rachidian tooth. This species is usually some shade of grey, the transverse sculpturing often being eroded and whitish. It grows to a maximum length of 33 mm (1.3 in).

== Distribution and habitat ==
This species is native to the warm waters of the tropical and subtropical western Atlantic Ocean, the Caribbean Sea and the Gulf of Mexico. Its range includes the coast of Georgia and the west and east coasts of Florida, including the Indian River Lagoon. It is an amphibious species, living in mud above and below high water mark. Within its range, it is plentiful in tidal creeks, estuaries, salt marshes and mangrove swamps. It is tolerant of wide variations in temperature and is resistant to desiccation.

== Ecology ==
The ladder hornsnail feeds on detritus and microalgae. It is predated by mud crabs and probably also by fiddler crabs, blue crabs, clapper rails, other wading birds, opossums and raccoons. Juveniles sometimes exhibit incomplete tentacles, and this may be the result of attacks by killifish.

In the Indian River Lagoon, breeding takes place between September and November, when jelly-clad spirals of bright green eggs are produced. The eggs hatch after about three weeks and the young develop directly into juveniles without a free-living larval stage. The juveniles tend to live underwater while the adults mostly live above high water mark. The juveniles reach maturity by August or September. Over time, the shells of adults become eroded and they are often parasitized by trematodes; most individuals probably die in their second winter.
