= Notocotylus =

Scientific classification
- Kingdom: Animalia
- Phylum: Platyhelminthes
- Class: Trematoda
- Order: Plagiorchiida
- Family: Notocotylidae
- Genus: Notocotylus; Diesing, 1839

Genus of flatworms

Notocotylus is a genus of trematodes belonging to the family Notocotylidae.

Species in the genus are cosmopolitan parasites of mainly aquatic birds and, to a lesser extent, mammals (mostly rodents).

== Species ==
Recognized species include:

- Notocotylus aegyptiaca (Odhner, 1905)
- Notocotylus atlanticus (Stunkard, 1966)
- Notocotylus attenuatus (Rudolphi, 1809)
- Notocotylus babai (Bhalerao, 1935)
- Notocotylus breviserialis (Stunkard, 1967)
- Notocotylus chionis (Baylis, 1928)
- Notocotylus dafilae (Harwood, 1939)
- Notocotylus diserialis (Sinitsin, 1896)
- Notocotylus duboisi (Stunkard, 1966)
- Notocotylus duboisianus (Odening, 1964)
- Notocotylus ephemera ((Nitzsch, 1817) Harwood, 1939)
- Notocotylus filamentis
- Notocotylus gibbus ((Mehlis, 1846) Kossack, 1911)
- Notocotylus gonzalezi (Simon Vicente et al., 1985)
- Notocotylus ikutai (Sasaki, Kobayashi, Yoshino, Asakawa & Nakao, 2021)
- Notocotylus imbricatus ((Looss, 1893) Szidat, 1935)
- Notocotylus linearis ((Rudolphi, 1819) Szidat, 1936)
- Notocotylus magniovatus (Yamaguti, 1934)
- Notocotylus malhamensis (Boyce, Hide, Craig, Harris, Reynolds, Pickles & Rogan, 2012)
- Notocotylus marinus (Ginetsinskaja & Naumov, 1958)
- Notocotylus micropalamae (Harwood, 1939)
- Notocotylus minutus (Stunkard, 1960)
- Notocotylus neyrai (Castro, 1945)
- Notocotylus noyeri (Joyeux, 1922)
- Notocotylus pacifer (Noble, 1933)
- Notocotylus pacifera ((Noble, 1933) Harwood, 1939)
- Notocotylus panjnadensis (Bhutta & Khan, 1975)
- Notocotylus parviovatus (Yamaguti, 1934)
- Notocotylus ponticus (Tschiaberaschwili, 1964)
- Notocotylus primulus (Diaz, Gilardon, Lorenti & Cremonti, 2019)
- Notocotylus ralli (Baylis, 1936)
- Notocotylus regis (Harwood, 1939)
- Notocotylus seineti (Fuhrmann, 1919)
- Notocotylus skrjabini (Ablasov, 1953)
- Notocotylus stagnicolae (Herber, 1942)
- Notocotylus tachyeretis (Duthoit, 1931)
- Notocotylus undefined
- Notocotylus urbanensis ((Cort, 1914) Harrah, 1922)
- Notocotylus urbanensis (Cort, 1914)
- Notocotylus vespertilionis (Rudolphi, 1819)
- Notocotylus wetlugensis (Schaldybin, 1965)
- Notocotylus zduni (Tschiaberaschwili & Dzavelidze, 1968)
- BOLD:ACA9471 (Notocotylus sp.)
- BOLD:ADM0374 (Notocotylus sp.)
- BOLD:ADZ2050 (Notocotylus sp.)
- BOLD:ADZ2052 (Notocotylus sp.)
- BOLD:AEB3182 (Notocotylus sp.)
- BOLD:AEB4897 (Notocotylus sp.)
- BOLD:AEB6096 (Notocotylus sp.)
