= Makiyama =

Makiyama (written: 牧山, lit. "pasture mountain") is a Japanese surname. Notable people with the name include:

- Hiroe Makiyama (牧山 弘恵, born 1964), Japanese politician
- Masafumi Makiyama (牧山 雅文, born 1979), Japanese archer
- Thomas H. Makiyama (1928–2005), American aikidoka

== See also ==
- Makiyama Station, a railway station in Okayama, Okayama Prefecture, Japan
- Hosuk Lee-Makiyama, Swedish diplomat
