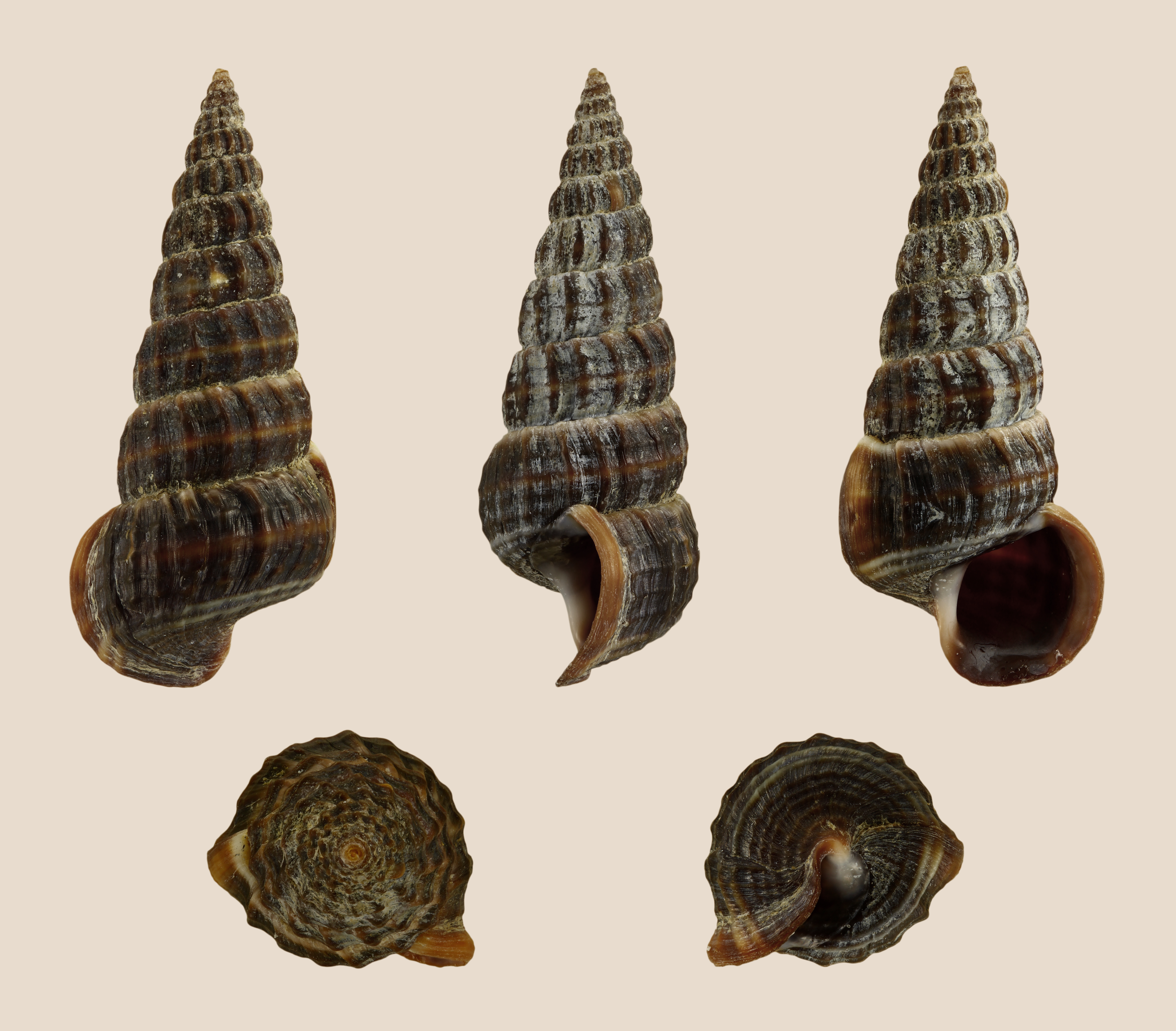
- A shell of Cerithideopsis californica

Scientific classification
- Kingdom: Animalia
- Phylum: Mollusca
- Class: Gastropoda
- Subclass: Caenogastropoda
- Order: incertae sedis
- Family: Potamididae
- Genus: Cerithideopsis
- Species: C. californica

Binomial name
- Cerithideopsis californica (Haldeman, 1840)

Synonyms
- List: Cerithidea albonodosa Gould & Carpenter, 1857; Cerithidea californica (Haldeman, 1840); Cerithidea mazatlanica (H. F. Carpenter, 1857); Cerithidea pullata A. A. Gould, 1856; Cerithidea sacrata (A. Gould, 1849); Cerithidea valida (C. B. Adams, 1852); Cerithium (Potamis) californicum Haldeman, 1840; Cerithium (Potamis) sacratum Gould, 1849; Cerithium aguayoi Clench, 1934; Cerithium californicum Haldeman, 1840; Cerithium fortiusculum Bayle, 1880; Cerithium sacratum Gould, 1849; Cerithium varicosum G. B. Sowerby I, 1834; Potamides (Cerithidea) californica (Haldeman, 1840)

= Cerithideopsis californica =

Species of gastropod

Cerithideopsis californica, common name the California hornsnail or the California horn snail, is a species of sea snail, a marine gastropod mollusk in the family Potamididae. This series was previously known as Cerithidea californica.

== Description ==
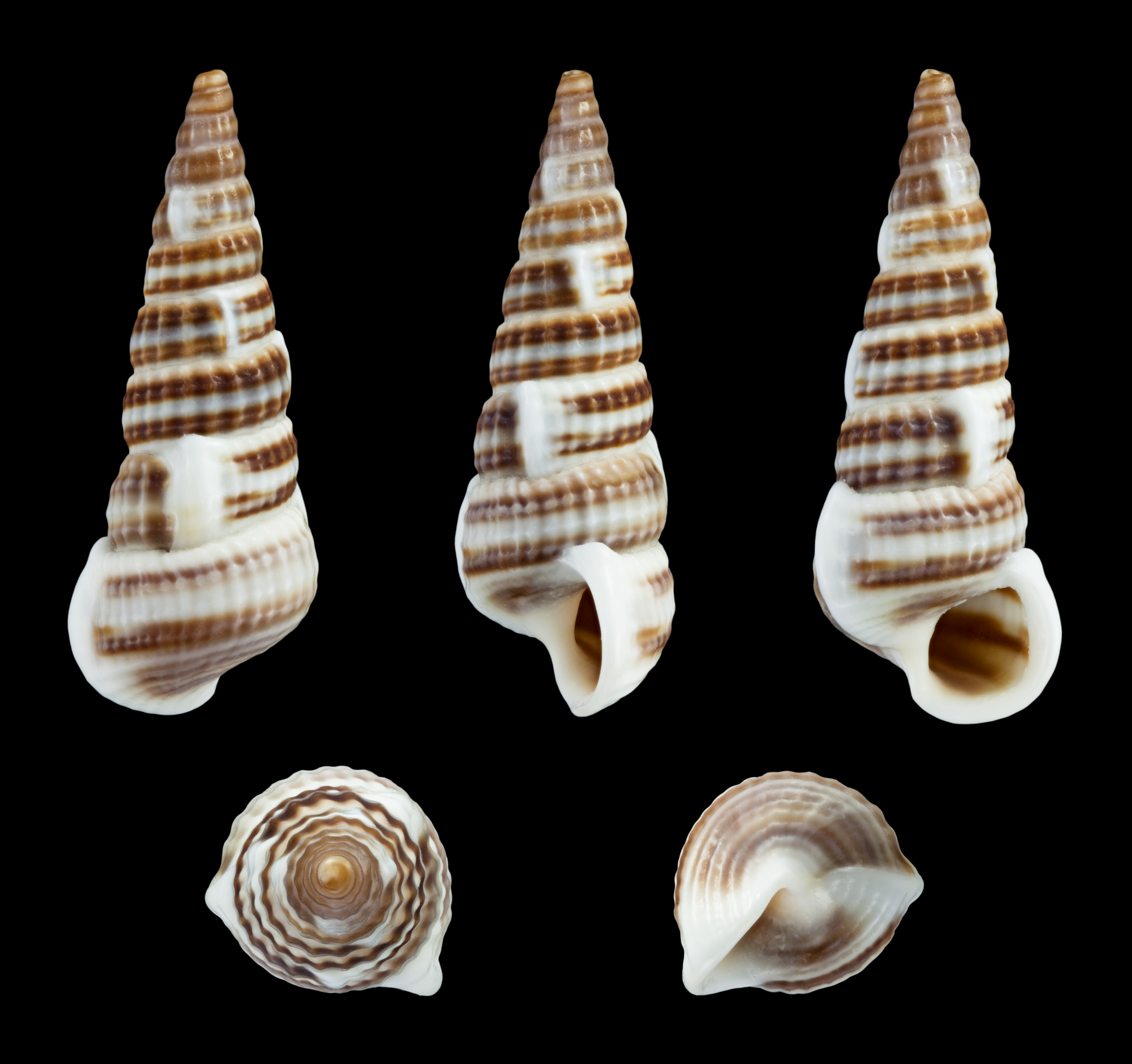
ssp. albonodosa

The shell is turriform in shape and about 1 inch (25 mm) in length.

== Distribution ==
The distribution of Cerithideopsis californica is from central California, USA to Baja California Sur, Mexico.

The type locality is "California, in brackish water".

== Ecology ==
Cerithideopsis californica lives in salt-marsh dominated estuaries.

The snails primarily feed on benthic diatoms.

Throughout its range in California, these snails grow and reproduce from spring through fall (March–October) and cease growth and reproduction during the winter (November–February). Maximum longevity for these snails is at least 6–10 years, and this appears to be the case for uninfected as well as infected snails.

At least 18 trematode species parasitically castrate California horn snails. A trematode infects a snail with a miracidium larva that either swims to infect the snail, or hatches after the snail ingests the trematode egg. After infection, the trematode parthenitae clonally replicate and produce free-swimming offspring (cercariae). These offspring infect second intermediate hosts (various invertebrates and fishes) where they form cysts (metacercariae). The trematodes infect bird final hosts when birds eat second intermediate hosts.

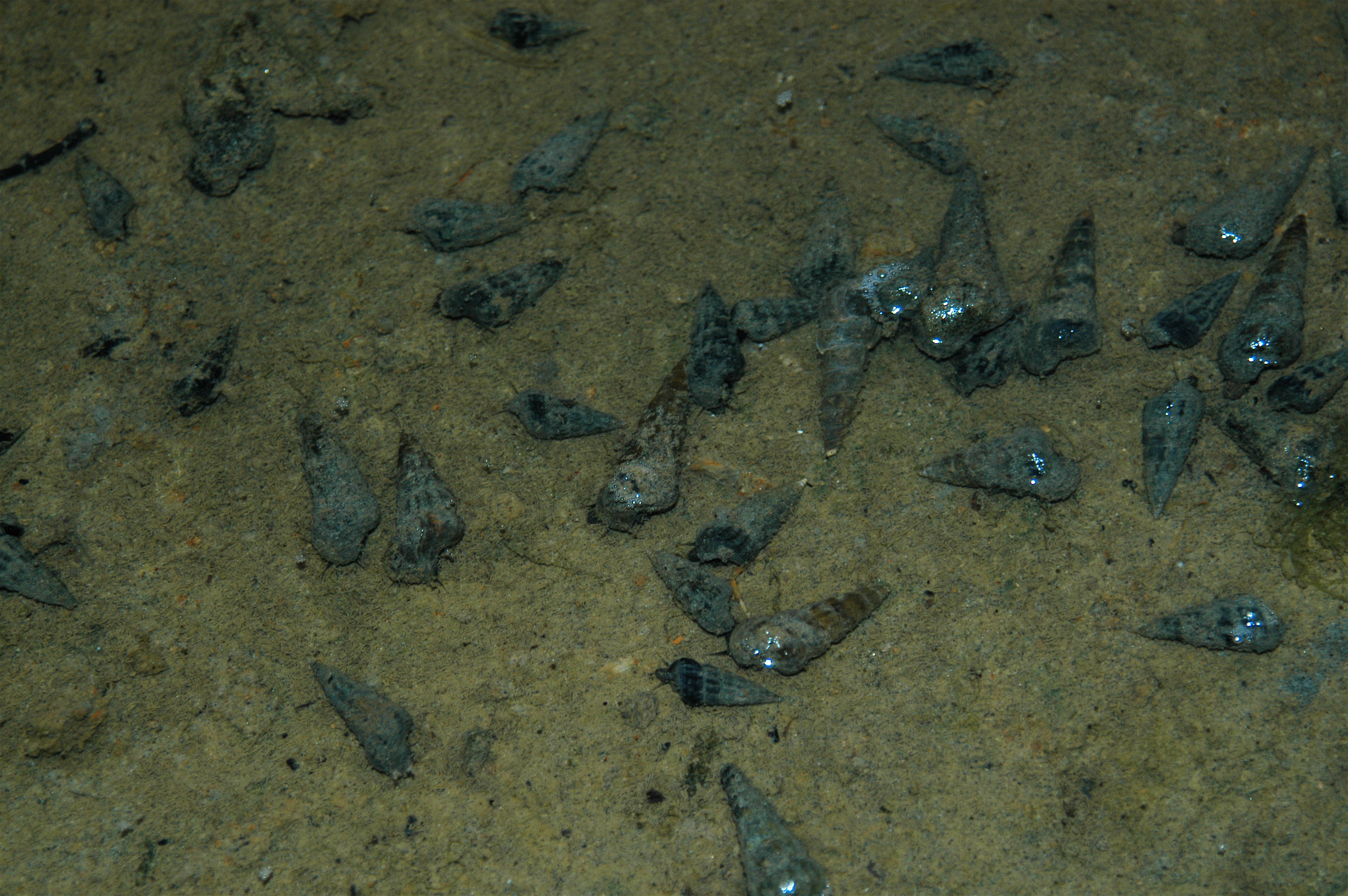
California horn snails are common in the Morro Bay estuary of California, particularly in the ponds on the south end of Wednesday Island.
