= Notocotylidae =

Scientific classification
- Kingdom: Animalia
- Phylum: Platyhelminthes
- Class: Trematoda
- Order: Plagiorchiida
- Suborder: Pronocephalata
- Superfamily: Pronocephaloidea
- Family: Notocotylidae; Lühe, 1909

Family of flukes

Notocotylidae is a family of trematodes in the order Plagiorchiida.

== Genera ==
- Catatropis Odhner, 1905
- Notocotylus Diesing, 1839
- Ogmogaster Jägerskiöld, 1891
- Paramonostomum Lühe, 1909
