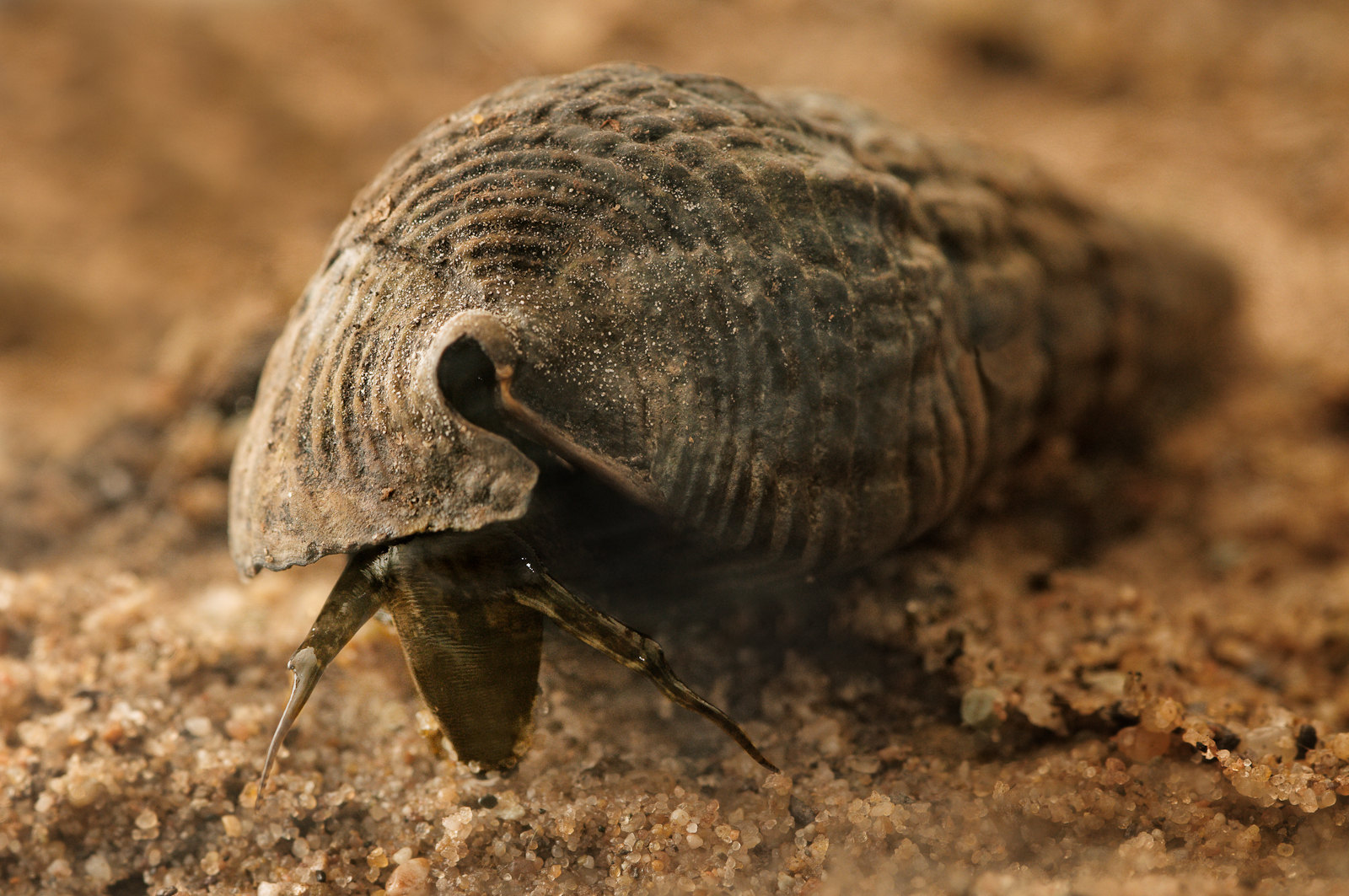
- A live individual of Terebralia palustris

Scientific classification
- Kingdom: Animalia
- Phylum: Mollusca
- Class: Gastropoda
- Subclass: Caenogastropoda
- Order: incertae sedis
- Superfamily: Cerithioidea
- Family: Potamididae; H. Adams & A. Adams, 1854

Synonyms
- Telescopiidae Allan, 1950; Cerithideidae Houbrick, 1988

= Potamididae =

Potamididae Temporal range: Middle Eocene-Recent

Family of gastropods

Potamididae, common name potamidids (also known as horn snails or mudwhelks) are a family of small to large brackish water snails that live on mud flats, mangroves and similar habitats. They are amphibious gastropod molluscs in the superfamily Cerithioidea.

Traditionally, potamidids and batillariids have been confused because they have similar shells and they live in similar environments. For many fossil taxa the family assignment to either of these two families is still unresolved or controversial.

According to the taxonomy of the Gastropoda by Bouchet & Rocroi (2005) the family Potamididae has no subfamilies.

== Distribution ==
The distribution of Potamididae includes the Indo-West Pacific, the eastern Pacific and the Atlantic Ocean.

== Genera ==
Six living and a number of fossil genera are currently recognized:

Recent genera:

- Cerithidea Swainson, 1840
- Cerithideopsis Thiele, 1929
  - possible subgenus or synonym: † Harrisianella Olson, 1929 - Reid et al. (2008) classify Harrisianella as a possible subgenus or synonym of Cerithideopsis
  - possible subgenus or synonym: † Lagunitis Olsson, 1929 - Reid et al. (2008) classify Lagunitis as a possible subgenus or synonym of Cerithideopsis
- Cerithideopsilla Thiele, 1929 - synonym: Pirenella Gray, 1847 (or of Potamides)
- Telescopium Montfort, 1810
- Terebralia Swainson, 1840
  - possible subgenus or synonym: † Gravesicerithium Charpiat, 1923
  - subgenus or synonym: † Cerithideops Pilsbry & Harbison, 1933
- Tympanotonos Schumacher, 1817

Fossil genera (fossils are difficult to differentiate from other cerithioideans, such as the Batillariidae):

- † Bittiscala Finlay & Marwick, 1937
- † Campanilopsis Chavan, 1949
- † Canaliscala Cossmann, 1888
- † Echinobathra Cossmann, 1906
- † Exechestoma Cossmann, 1899
- † Gantechinobathra Kowalke, 2001
- † Hadraxon Oppenheim, 1892
- † Potamides Brongniart, 1810 - type genus, its type species is extinct and the whole genus is extinct, synonym: Pirenella Gray, 1847
  - subgenus or synonym: † Ptychopotamides Saccho, 1895
  - subgenus or synonym: † Mesohalina Wittibschlager, 1983
  - subgenus or synonym: † Vicarya d'Archiac & Haimes, 1854
  - subgenus or synonym: † Vicaryella Yabe & Hatai, 1938
  - possible subgenus or synonym: † Eotympanotonus Chavan, 1952
- † Potamidopsis Munier-Chalmas, 1900
- † Terebraliopsis Cossmann, 1906

Generic names brought into synonymy

- Aphanistylus P. Fischer, 1884: synonym of Cerithidea Swainson, 1840
- Phaenommia Mörch, 1860: synonym of Cerithidea Swainson, 1840
- Pirenella Gray, 1847 is a synonym of Potamides Brongniart, 1810 or of Cerithideopsilla
- Tympanotomus Gray, 1840: synonym of Tympanotonos Schumacher, 1817
- Tympanotonus Agassiz, 1846: synonym of Tympanotonos Schumacher, 1817

== Ecology ==
Most of the 29 living species of Potamididae show a close association with mangroves. Most species live on mudflats, but some also climb mangrove trees.
