= Trematoda in Kuwait =

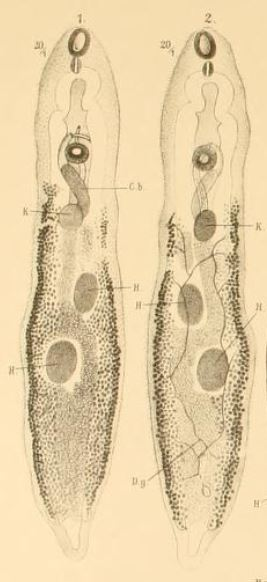
Trematoda

Trematoda is a whole-living worm that lives in different parts of the host's body, some of which live in bile ducts. These are called hepatic worms such as Fasciola species, including species that live in the intestines such as the genus Heterophyes, including those living in blood vessels such as the genus that causes schistosomiasis, the genus of Schistosoma. Including what lives in the lung such as the genus of Paragonimus.

These worms are characterized by particular growth in the reproductive organs and reduction in the organs of movement and digestion, most of which are effeminate, that the worm contains the female and male reproductive system, except for the genus causing schistosomiasis. Their life cycle includes intermediate hosts, are usually snails. There are about 70 species out of a total of 100,000 or more species of snails are the middle families of worms that infect humans.

Trematoda has a different life cycle in Kuwait because Kuwait does not have the perfect environment for Trematoda to grow as it does in other countries. Trematoda tries to cohabit with Kuwait's atmosphere, so it changes its life cycle. There are different types of Trematoda as mentioned, but each type has its life cycle, which means each one of those types will change their life cycles to survive in Kuwait's environment.

essential types of worms in Kuwait is the following:

== Liver fluke ==
Liver flukes have many species, including the type found in cattle, Fasciola hepatica, or other species such as Fasciola Gigantica is larger than the previous type. Sheep, goats, and cattle are often infected, rarely infect the human liver, causing damage to the bile ducts and liver tissue. Humans get infected with worms as a result of eating metacercariae that can be found in the edible herbaceous plants that grow in swamps and wet places. The life cycle of this worm is only complete with an intermediate host, a snail living in freshwater. Since Kuwait does not contain rivers, extensive swamps, and canals, it is likely that there will not be a full cycle and possible injuries in Kuwait, despite the presence of this species Fasciola in the liver of cattle and sheep slaughtered. It is more likely that the infection occurred from the countries from which these sheep and cattle were imported, as most of these countries, such as Sudan, Iraq, Syria, Turkey and other countries from which Kuwait imports its meat are entirely different in their natural environment from Kuwait. As for the human infection is not possible in Kuwait, the human does not get liver fluke when eating the infected liver, which contains the worm or eggs. Because the eggs need to hatch outside the human body and turn into a larva inside the shell and then come out to be a contagious ripe caterpillar sticking to the aquatic plants or near the water waiting for the final host, whether cattle or human.

== Heterophyes heterophyes ==
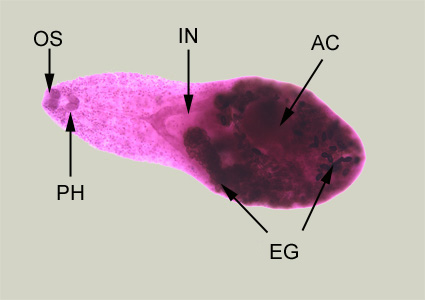
Heterophyes Heterophyes

H. heterophytes are the smallest splayed worm that preys on humans (0.5 - 0.3 millimeters). Infections have been reported in Kuwait, and the worm lives in the small intestine of the human being buried between the Intestinal villus. It also lives in the intestines of some animals that feed on fish such as dogs and cats. So found that the incidence of dogs in Kuwait up to 3.4%.

=== Life cycle and methods of infection ===
The worm egg is light brown and has a thick wall and cover, up to 16x29 micrometers. The eggs come out with the feces outside the body. The worm has two average families: the first is the sea snail, which is the species of pirenella, located in Egypt or the genus Cerithidea in Japan. These snails feed on the material found on the bottom of the lakes including the eggs of this worm that went down with the feces. These eggs hatch in the snail into germs, and then go out into the water and live for about 60 hours in the water looking for the second host which is the mullet, species of Tilapia, the Mugil, and the Acanthogobius. It then sticks on the fish fins, tail, or gills. After about 48 hours, it endospores inside the second host. After about 20 days it turns into a metacercariae phase. This is the infectious phase.

Infection of humans or animals occurs when the mullet or tilapia is not well cooked and with these metacercariae conductors; In the human intestine, the worm leaves the integument and attaches to the intestinal mucosa membrane between the Intestinal villus and grows into an adult worm in about a week. After about 25 days, the worm begins fertilizing the eggs and then reintroduces the life cycle.

It is noted that the infection of this worm does not cause significant harm to humans except in severe infection, which causes chronic mucous diarrhea interrupted with colic and discomfort in the abdomen. If worms penetrate the intestinal wall, they may reach the lymphatic or blood vessels and cause tumors in the heart or brain.

Infection can be avoided by refraining from eating raw or poorly cooked fish or eating salted and grounded salted Fesikh for less than 14 days.

== Schistosoma ==
Schistosoma is one of the most important parasitic worms on humans, and this worm does not take the life cycle in Kuwait, but some of those coming to Kuwait come from neighboring countries where this worm is endemic and spread, as the availability of freshwater in that country provides the best conditions to the worm to find its intermediate hosts of certain types of snails, and water is the medium in which the infection of human happens. Also, people who are carrying these worms in their bodies, the infection will be limited to them and not exceed them to others. Human is the main host of three types of Schistosoma.

=== Schistosoma haematobium ===
The full-grown worms of this species end up in the urinary bladder, where the female puts eggs in the papillae near the bladder, causing urinary incontinence or schistosomiasis.

=== Schistosoma mansoni and Schistosoma japonicum ===
These two types settle in the intestinal veins where the female puts her eggs near the rectum and causes the intestinal Schistosomiasis.

Adult worms live in pairs. The female stabilizes in the male's abdominal groove. The eggs pass through the veins every day, ranging from 300 (Schistosoma mansoni) to 3,500 (Schistosoma Japanicum) eggs depending on the type of worm. Soluble enzymes and veins contractions help to tear the walls where the eggs are released into the surrounding tissues of the intestine or bladder vessels. The eggs pass into the cavities of these organs and are either going out with stool or urine. In the water, the eggs hatch from larvae with cilia swimming in an activity searching for a particular type of snail that can follow in its body the steps of its growth and development from stage to stage until it reaches the stage known as the cercariae whose body ends with a long tail with a split end. These cercariae exit from the body of the snail to the water, searching for a human who wants water for showering and bathing to penetrates his skin, and circulates with the blood in his body until finally settling in the preferred place, according to type, either in the veins of the bladder or veins of the wall of the intestine, where it reaches the growth of sexual in a few weeks, Also, adult worms live in humans for an extended period of 30 years.

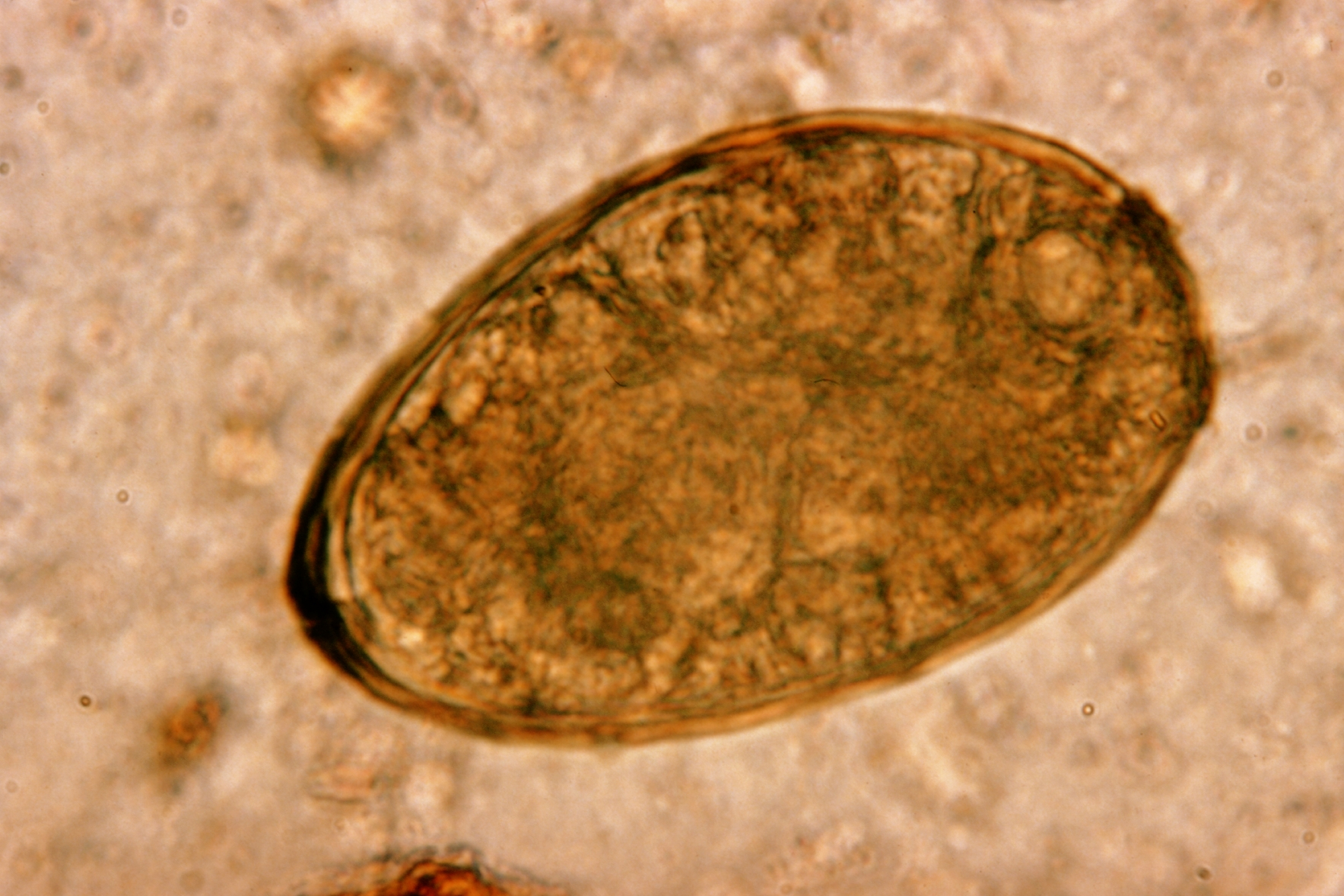
Paragonimus

== Paragonimus ==
This worm has a global spread in mammals, but its presence in humans is confined mainly to the Far East. The adult worm lives in the human lungs. Humans get infected by eating an infected raw crab, or astacus. This is commonly followed in the Far East, where raw and salted crustaceans are eaten in vinegar and wine in the form of an intoxicating syrup, in which infected cercariae live for 8 hours. These infectious larvae also contaminate foods or substances used to prepare food. Astacus juice is the source of infection in children, taken orally and used in the treatment of measles in Korea. The larvae that are trapped in the crab can be killed if cooked in water to a temperature of 55 °C for 5 minutes.

These worms are not found in Kuwait, but it is possible to be infected, especially since many people travel to Far Eastern countries for trade or recreation. Many of these people are fond of eating raw crustaceans, which are considered to be the most delicious dishes in the Far East. Many people in the Far East are likely to have some infections. Here the doctors should be aware of this and know what the characteristics of some countries in their habits.
