= Acanthoparyphium tyosenense =

Scientific classification
- Kingdom: Animalia
- Phylum: Platyhelminthes
- Class: Trematoda
- Order: Plagiorchiida
- Family: Himasthlidae
- Genus: Acanthoparyphium
- Species: A. tyosenense

Binomial name
- Acanthoparyphium tyosenense Yamaguti, 1939

Synonyms
- Cercaria yamagutii Ito, 1957

Species of fluke

Acanthoparyphium tyosenense is a species of digenetic trematodes in the family Himasthlidae.

The first intermediate host of Acanthoparyphium tyosenense include marine snails Laguncula pulchella, Neverita didyma, Pirenella microptera, Pirenella cingulata, and Cerithideopsis largillierti.

The second intermediate host of Acanthoparyphium tyosenense include marine bivalves Mactra veneriformis, Solen grandis, Solen strictus, Ruditapes philippinarum and a brackish water snail Clithon bicolor.

The final hosts include also humans. The experimental definitive hosts include chicks Gallus gallus domesticus and black-tailed gull Larus crassirostris.
