= Southwellina =

Scientific classification
- Kingdom: Animalia
- Phylum: Acanthocephala
- Class: Palaeacanthocephala
- Order: Polymorphida
- Family: Polymorphidae
- Genus: Southwellina; Witenberg, 1932

Genus of worms

Southwellina is a genus in Acanthocephala (thorny-headed worms, also known as spiny-headed worms).

== Taxonomy ==
The genus was described by Witenberg in 1932. Phylogenetic analysis has been published on Southwellina species. The type species is S. hispida.

== Description ==
Southwellina species consist of a proboscis covered in hooks and a trunk.

== Species ==
The genus Southwellina contains three species.

- Southwellina hispida (Van Cleave, 1925)
- Southwellina macracanthus (Ward & Winter, 1952)
- Southwellina sacra Bhattacharya, Pande & Srivastaca, 2002

== Distribution ==
The distribution of Southwellina is determined by that of its hosts. The species of this genus are found in Northern America and India.

== Hosts ==
Life cycle of Acanthocephala. (Note: There are no known aberrant human infections for Southwellina species.)

The life cycle of an acanthocephalan consists of three stages beginning when an infective acanthor (development of an egg) is released from the intestines of the definitive host and then ingested by an arthropod, the intermediate host. The intermediate hosts of Southwellina are arthropods. When the acanthor molts, the second stage called the acanthella begins. This stage involves penetrating the wall of the mesenteron or the intestine of the intermediate host and growing. The final stage is the infective cystacanth which is the larval or juvenile state of an Acanthocephalan, differing from the adult only in size and stage of sexual development. The cystacanths within the intermediate hosts are consumed by the definitive host, usually attaching to the walls of the intestines, and as adults they reproduce sexually in the intestines. The acanthor is passed in the feces of the definitive host and the cycle repeats. Some paratenic hosts (hosts where parasites infest but do not undergo larval development or sexual reproduction) for S. hispida is Gillichthys mirabilis.

Southwellina is a generalist parasite that uses a wide range of definitive hosts to complete its life cycle. There are no reported cases of Southwellina infesting humans in the English language medical literature.

Hosts for xx species
