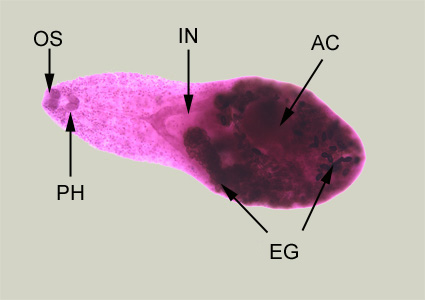
- Adult specimen stained with carmine

Scientific classification
- Kingdom: Animalia
- Phylum: Platyhelminthes
- Class: Trematoda
- Order: Plagiorchiida
- Family: Heterophyidae
- Genus: Heterophyes
- Species: H. heterophyes

Binomial name
- Heterophyes heterophyes (Siebold, 1853)

Synonyms
- Heterophyes aegyptiaca Cobbold, 1866

= Heterophyes heterophyes =

Species of fluke

Heterophyes heterophyes, or the intestinal fish fluke, is a species of digenean flatworm that was discovered by Theodor Maximilian Bilharz in 1851. This parasite was found during an autopsy of an Egyptian mummy. H. heterophyes is found in the Middle East, West Europe and Africa. They use different species to complete their complex lifestyle. Humans and other mammals are the definitive hosts, first intermediate hosts are snails, and second intermediate are fish. Mammals that come in contact with the parasite are dogs, humans, and cats. Snails that are competent hosts for this parasite include Cerithideopsilla conica. Fish that come in contact with this parasite include Mugil cephalus, Tilapia nilotica, Aphanius fasciatus, and Acanthogobius sp. Humans and mammals will come in contact with this parasite by the consumption of contaminated or raw fish. This parasite is one of the smallest endoparasites to infect humans. It can cause an intestinal infection called heterophyiasis.

== Distribution ==
This species occurs in Egypt, Sudan, Israel, Brazil, Spain, Turkey, Iran, India, and Russia. Common in North Africa, Asia Minor, Korea, China, Japan, Taiwan, and the Philippines. In Egypt, after looking at twelve populations of Cerithideopsilla conica, which is a mud snail and carrier of Heterophyes heterophyes, it was found that the most infected snails were found in the Nile Delta compared to the Red Sea coast and inland waters of the Delta. The transmission of Heterophyes heterophyes is from Pirenella conica, a snail, to fish which live in Northern Africa in lagoons that are connected to the sea. For transmission to occur from snails to fish the snails had to be larger than 5 mm.

== Morphology ==
Minute teardrop-shaped flukes found in the small intestines of fish-eating birds and mammals. The eggs are hard to tell apart from other related species so there is no accurate estimate of human infection. H. heterophyes is a small trematode, ranging up to 1.4mm long and 0.5mm wide. It is covered with scale-like spikes. Their pharynx is completely developed and connected to the cecum of the small intestines. The anterior opening of the pharynx is surrounded by the oral sucker. Their testes are located at the posterior of the parasite, with paired testes side by side. The ovaries are located in the medial of the parasite, right above the testes. The ventral sucker, also known as the acetabulum, is located on the ventral median surface of the parasite. The ventral sucker helps them attach to the host. Slightly to the side and behind the ventral sucker is the gonotyl, the third sucker that surrounds the genital opening. Minute spines made of chitin ring the gonotyl numbering 70 to 85. Morphology can change depending on what fish it lives on. The eggs are a yellow-brown color and measure about 30 mcm by 15 mcm.

== Life cycle ==
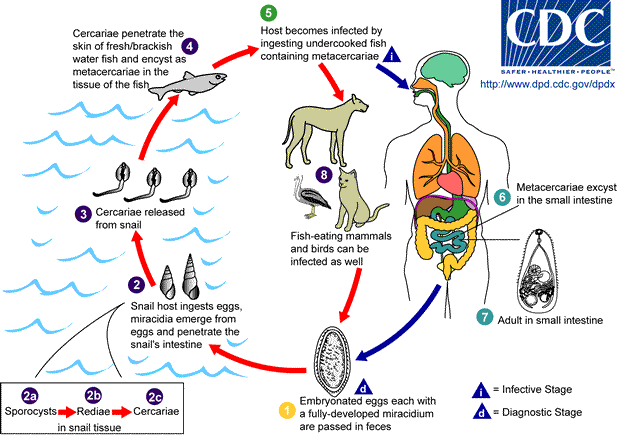
Life cycle of Heterophyes heterophyes.

The adult flukes live burrowed between the villi of the host's small intestine. It only takes around four to six hours for H. heterophyes to get to the small intestines in the definitive host and even faster in hosts that it does not prefer. The eggs that are laid contain a miracidium but do not hatch until they are ingested by a snail (Cerithideopsilla conica in Egypt or Cerithidea cingulata in Iran and Japan). Inside the snail's gut, the miracidium becomes a sporocyst which then begin to produce rediae. The rediae produce cercariae which then exit the snail, swim toward the surface of the water, and slowly fall back down. On their way down, they contact a fish and penetrate into the epithelium of the fish. Here, the cercariae encyst in the muscle tissue. The second intermediate host include the freshwater fish Mugil cephalus, Tilapia nilotica, Aphanius fasciatus, and Acanthogobius sp. The definitive host, such as humans or birds, eats the undercooked or raw meat of a fish and ingest the parasite. Natural definitive hosts are cats, dogs, foxes, wolves, pelicans, and humans.

== Epidemiology ==
People at high risk for infection are those who live by bay waters including fishermen. Infection is acquired by eating raw fish, a common food in areas of heavy endemicity. In endemic areas, people who live near lake shores or river banks usually have a higher rate and intensity of infection than those living a distance from such areas. It is possible that inhabitants of these areas eat more low-salted or improperly cooked fish and that their fish are obtained from polluted water. It is common practice for people to defecate on the lake shores and river banks or from their boats while fishing. In rural areas of Egypt there was a higher chance of being infected with H. heterophyes due to being a lower socioeconomic area and not having easy access to medical services.

== Pathology ==
Each worm causes a mild inflammatory reaction at its site of contact with the intestine. In heavy infections which are common cause damage to the mucosa and produce intestinal pain and mucosa diarrhea. Sometimes eggs can enter the blood and lymph vascular systems through mucosa go into the ectopic sites in the body. The heart can be affected with tissue reaction in the valves and myocardium that cause heart failure. There is potential for eggs to travel into the brain or spinal cord and cause neurological disorders and sometimes fatalities. Antigen and immune complex deposits left by H. heterophyes in the brain and kidneys of mice prove that there are changes in these tissues of the infected.

H. heterophyes can cause intestinal infection called heterophyiasis. The infection can be asymptomatic or intestinal discomfort and mucous diarrhea. This parasite can start cell apoptosis in the intestinal epithelial cell, at early infection. This infection can cause enlarged intestinal crypts, acute to chronic inflammation, atrophy, and fusion and shortening of the intestinal villi. After early infection this parasite will inhibit apoptosis which can cause the decrease in caspase-3 and NF-jB. Caspase-3 and NF-jB are proteins that are essential to induce programmed cell death, apoptosis.

== Diagnosis ==
Diagnosis done by stool examination is difficult when adult worms are absent. The eggs are hard to distinguish from Metagonimiasis yokogawai and resemble Clonorchis sp. and Opisthorchis sp.

== Treatment ==
The effect of praziquantel on H. heterophyes causes deep lesions on their teguments, and when exposed to praziquantel over a longer period of time leads to even deeper lesions.
