= Heterophyes nocens =

Scientific classification
- Domain: Eukaryota
- Kingdom: Animalia
- Phylum: Platyhelminthes
- Class: Trematoda
- Order: Plagiorchiida
- Family: Heterophyidae
- Genus: Heterophyes
- Species: H. nocens

Binomial name
- Heterophyes nocens Onji & Nishio, 1916

Synonyms
- Heterophyes katsuradai Ozaki & Asada, 1926

Species of fluke

Heterophyes nocens is a species of trematodes, or fluke worms, in the family Heterophyidae.

== Distribution ==
This species occurs in:

- southwestern Korea in coastal regions
- Kōchi Prefecture, Chiba Prefecture, Yamaguchi Prefecture, Chūgoku region, Hiroshima Prefecture, and Shizuoka Prefecture in Japan
- China.

== Life cycle ==
The first intermediate hosts of Heterophyes nocens include brackish water snail Cerithideopsilla cingulata.

The second intermediate host include freshwater fish: Mugil cephalus, and Acanthogobius flavimanus.

Natural definitive hosts are fish-eating mammals: cats, dogs and rats. It can infect humans when eating raw fish.
