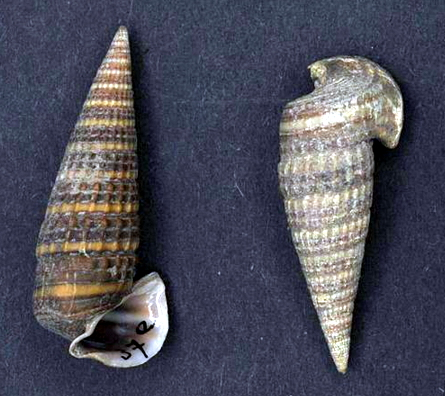
- Two shells of Pirenella alata (museum specimens at Naturalis Biodiversity Center)

Scientific classification
- Kingdom: Animalia
- Phylum: Mollusca
- Class: Gastropoda
- Subclass: Caenogastropoda
- Order: incertae sedis
- Family: Potamididae
- Genus: Pirenella
- Species: P. alata

Binomial name
- Pirenella alata (Philippi, 1849)

Synonyms
- Cerithidea alata (Philippi, 1849); Cerithidea djadjariensis (K. Martin, 1899); Cerithideopsilla alata (Philippi, 1849); Cerithideopsilla djadjariensis (K. Martin, 1899); Cerithium alatum Philippi, 1849; Cerithidea alata (Philippi, 1849); † Potamides (Cerithidea) djadjariensis K. Martin, 1899; † Potamides djadjariensis K. Martin, 1899; Tympanotonos euryptera G. B. Sowerby II, 1866

= Pirenella alata =

Species of gastropod

Pirenella alata is a species of sea snail, a marine gastropod mollusk in the family Potamididae. It also lives in brackish water.

== Distribution ==
This species occurs in the Philippines, Myanmar, India, Malaysia, Thailand, Vietnam, Singapore and Indonesia. Indonesia
