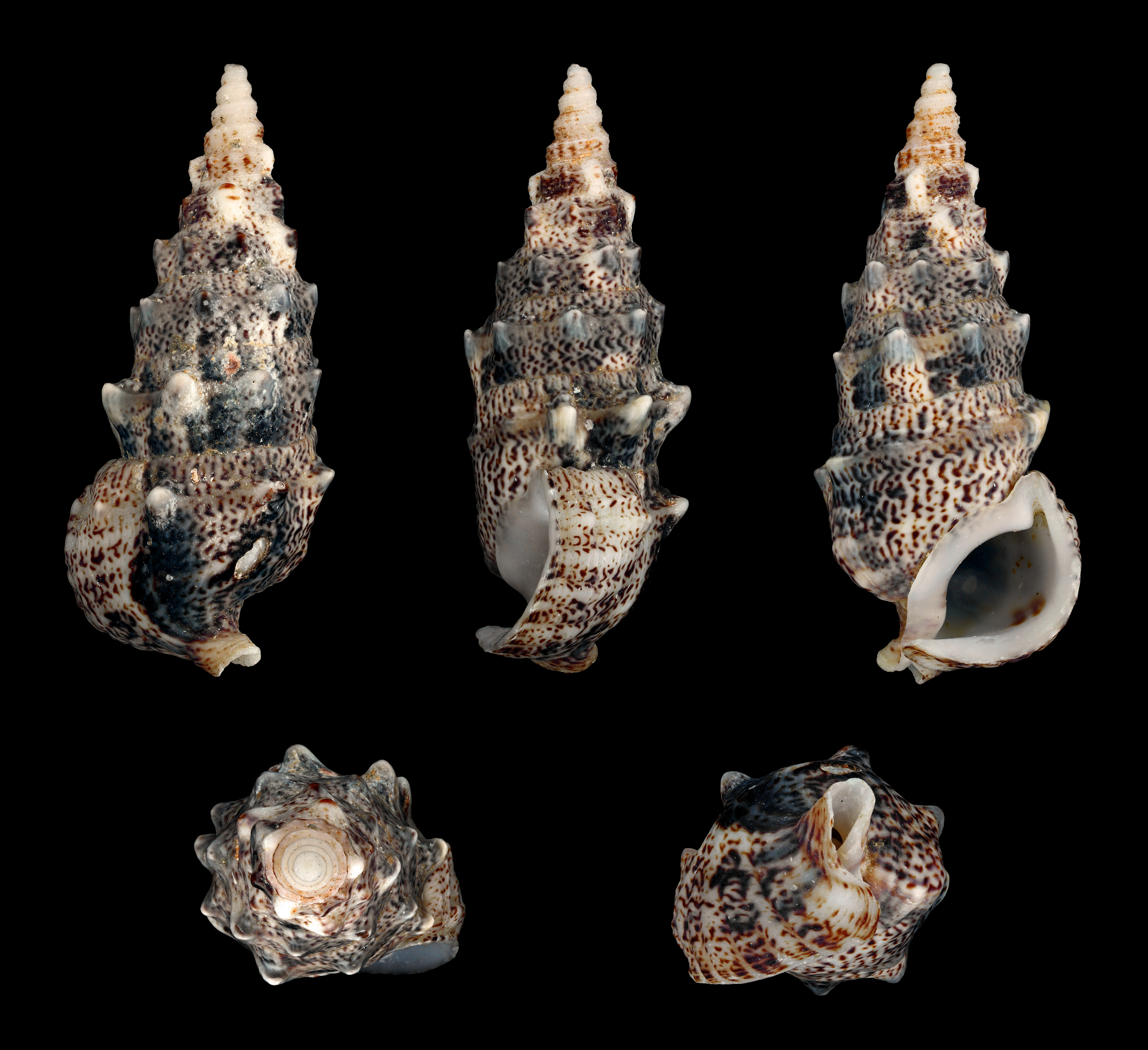
- Five views of a shell of Pseudovertagus aluco

Scientific classification
- Kingdom: Animalia
- Phylum: Mollusca
- Class: Gastropoda
- Subclass: Caenogastropoda
- Order: incertae sedis
- Family: Cerithiidae
- Genus: Pseudovertagus; Vignal, 1904

Synonyms
- Pseudovertagus (Pseudovertagus) Vignal, 1904

= Pseudovertagus =

Genus of gastropods

Pseudovertagus is a genus of sea snails, marine gastropod mollusks in the family Cerithiidae.

== Species ==
Species within the genus Pseudovertagus include:

- Pseudovertagus aluco (Linnaeus, 1758)
- Pseudovertagus clava (Gmelin, 1791)
- Pseudovertagus elegans Bozzetti, 2006
- Pseudovertagus nobilis (Reeve, 1855)
- Pseudovertagus peroni Wilson, 1975
- Pseudovertagus phylarchus (Iredale, 1929)

Species brought into synonymy

- Pseudovertagus excelsior Iredale, 1930: synonym of Pseudovertagus phylarchus (Iredale, 1929)
