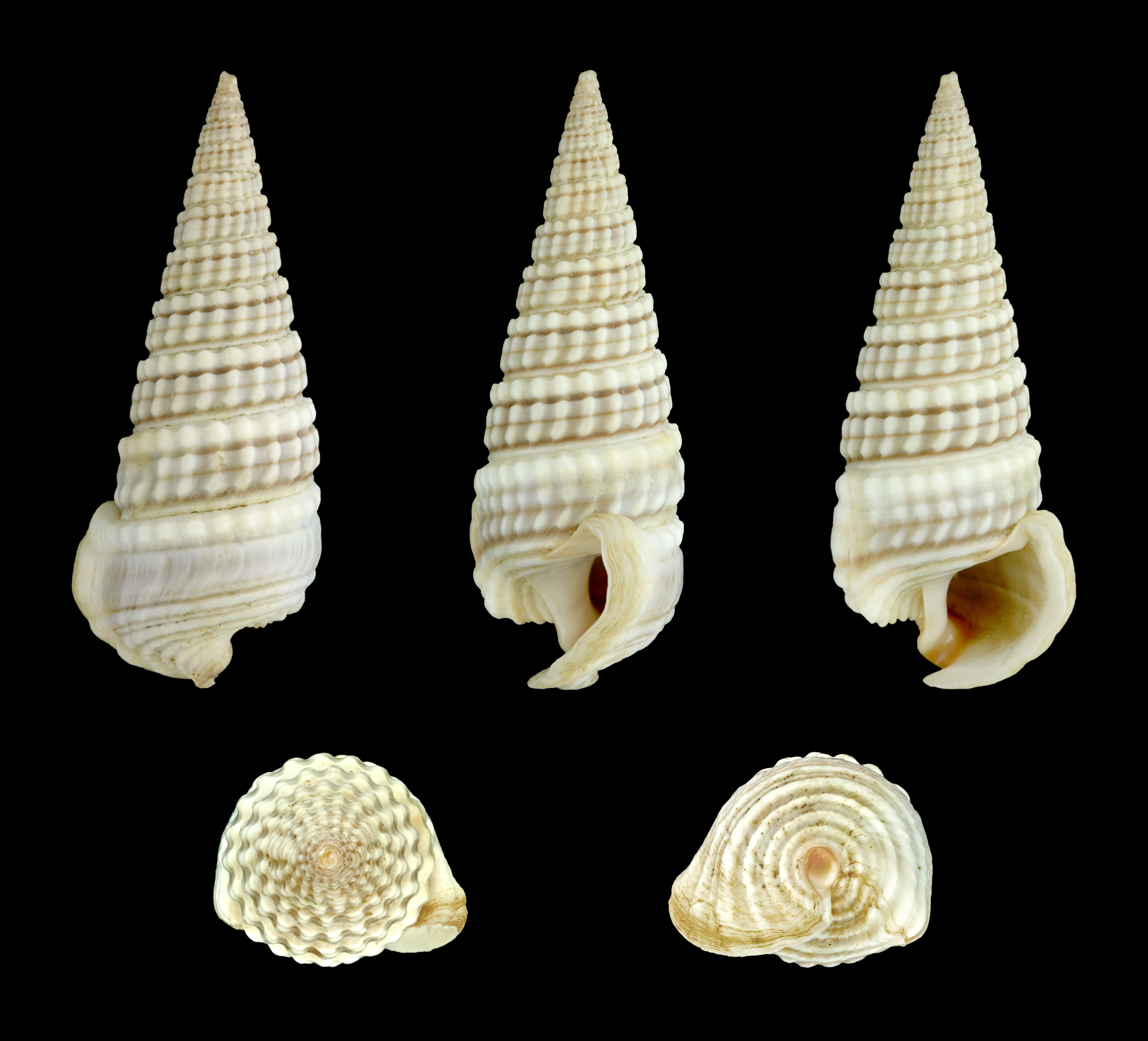
- Pirenella cingulata (Gmelin, 1791)

Scientific classification
- Kingdom: Animalia
- Phylum: Mollusca
- Class: Gastropoda
- Subclass: Caenogastropoda
- Order: incertae sedis
- Superfamily: Cerithioidea
- Family: Potamididae
- Genus: Pirenella; Gray, 1847

Type species
- Pirenella mammillata Gray, 1847

Synonyms
- Cerithidea (Cerithideopsilla) Thiele, 1929 (original rank); Cerithidea (Pirenella) Gray, 1847; Cerithideopsilla Thiele, 1929; Cerithium (Pirenella) Gray, 1847; Djeddilia Jousseaume, 1894; Potamides (Pirenella)

= Pirenella =

Genus of gastropods

Pirenella is a genus of sea snails, marine gastropod mollusks in the family Potamididae.

== Species ==
Species within the genus Pirenella include:

- Pirenella alata (Philippi, 1849)
- Pirenella arabica Reid, 2016
- Pirenella asiatica Ozawa & Reid, 2016
- Pirenella austrocingulata Reid, 2015
- † Pirenella balatonica (Tausch, 1886)
- Pirenella caiyingyai (Qian, Fang & He, 2013)
- Pirenella cancellata Ozawa & Reid, 2016
- Pirenella cingulata (Gmelin, 1791)
- Pirenella conica (Blainville, 1829)
- † Pirenella delicatula Reid, 2016
- † Pirenella etrusca (Mayer, 1864)
- Pirenella graeca (Deshayes, 1835)
- Pirenella incisa (Hombron & Jacquinot, 1848)
- Pirenella microptera (Kiener, 1841)
- Pirenella nanhaiensis Fu & Reid, 2016
- Pirenella nipponica Ozawa & Reid, 2016
- Pirenella pupiformis Ozawa & Reid, 2016
- Pirenella retifera (G. B. Sowerby II, 1855)
- Pirenella rugosa Reid, 2016
- † Pirenella subconica (Pallary, 1901)
- † Pirenella supracretacea (Tausch, 1886)

Species brought into synonymy

- Pirenella boswellae (Barnard, 1963): synonym of Pseudovertagus clava (Gmelin, 1791)
- Pirenella cailliaudi (Potiez & Michaud, 1838): synonym of Pirenella conica (Blainville, 1829)
- Pirenella insculpta (G. B. Sowerby II, 1865): synonym of Zeacumantus plumbeus (G.B. Sowerby II, 1855)
- Pirenella layardii (A. Adams, 1854): synonym of Pirenella conica (Blainville, 1829)
- Pirenella mammillata (Gray, 1847): synonym of Pirenella conica (Blainville, 1829)
