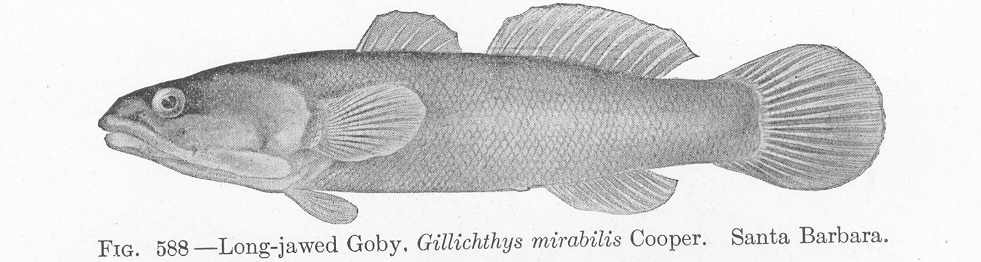
- Gillichthys mirabilis

Scientific classification
- Domain: Eukaryota
- Kingdom: Animalia
- Phylum: Chordata
- Class: Actinopterygii
- Order: Gobiiformes
- Family: Oxudercidae
- Subfamily: Gobionellinae
- Genus: Gillichthys; J. G. Cooper, 1864

Type species
- Gillichthys mirabilis J. G. Cooper, 1864

Synonyms
- Aprolepis C. L. Hubbs, 1921; Gillia Günther, 1865

= Gillichthys =

Genus of fishes

Gillichthys is a genus of gobies native to the coasts of Baja California and southern California.

== Etymology ==
"Gillichthys" literally means "Gill's fish". It was named in honor of the ichthyologist Theodore Gill.

== Species ==
There are currently three recognized species in this genus:

- Gillichthys detrusus Gilbert & Scofield, 1898 (Delta mudsucker)
- Gillichthys mirabilis J. G. Cooper, 1864 (Longjaw mudsucker)
- Gillichthys seta (Ginsburg, 1938) (Shortjaw mudsucker)
