= Acanthoparyphium =

Scientific classification
- Domain: Eukaryota
- Kingdom: Animalia
- Phylum: Platyhelminthes
- Class: Trematoda
- Order: Plagiorchiida
- Family: Himasthlidae
- Genus: Acanthoparyphium; Dietz, 1909

Genus of flatworms

Acanthoparyphium is a genus of flatworms belonging to the family Himasthlidae.

The species of this genus are found in Australia and Japan.

Species:

- Acanthoparyphium charadrii Yamaguti, 1939
- Acanthoparyphium haematopi Gu & Qiu, 1979
- Acanthoparyphium jeetai Chakrabarti, 2004
- Acanthoparyphium kurogamo Yamaguti, 1939
- Acanthoparyphium marilae Yamaguti, 1934
- Acanthoparyphium melanittae Yamaguti, 1939
- Acanthoparyphium ochthodromi Tubangui, 1933
- Acanthoparyphium pagollae Cable, Connor & Balling, 1960
- Acanthoparyphium phoenicopteri (Lühe, 1898) Dietz, 1909
- Acanthoparyphium spinulosum Johnston, 1917
- Acanthoparyphium squatarolae Yamaguti, 1934
- Acanthoparyphium tyosenense Yamaguti, 1939
