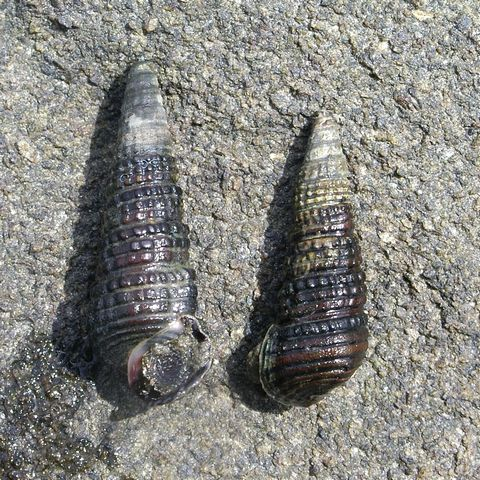
- Two live individuals of Cerithideopsilla incisa

Scientific classification
- Kingdom: Animalia
- Phylum: Mollusca
- Class: Gastropoda
- Subclass: Caenogastropoda
- Order: incertae sedis
- Family: Potamididae
- Genus: Pirenella
- Species: P. incisa

Binomial name
- Pirenella incisa (Hombron & Jacquinot, 1848)

Synonyms
- Cerithideopsilla incisa (Hombron & Jacquinot, 1848)

= Pirenella incisa =

Species of gastropod

Pirenella incisa is a species of medium-sized sea snail or mud snail, a marine gastropod mollusk in the family Potamididae, the horn snails.

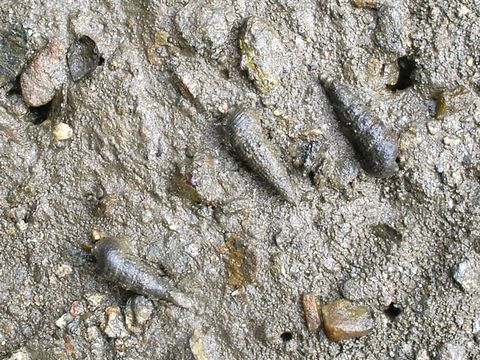
Cerithideopsilla incisa

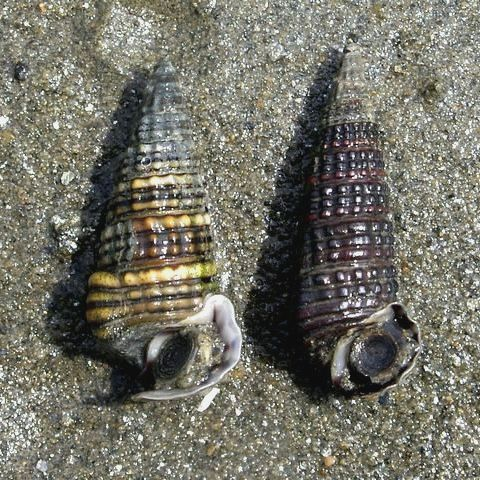
Comparison of Cerithideopsilla cingulata (left) and Cerithideopsilla incisa (right).

== Distribution ==
This is a vulnerable species (VU) in Japan.

== Ecology ==
Pirenella incisa is a predominantly mangrove-associated species.
