= Gillichthys seta =

Conservation status
- Least Concern (IUCN 3.1)

Scientific classification
- Kingdom: Animalia
- Phylum: Chordata
- Class: Actinopterygii
- Division: Teleostei
- Order: Gobiiformes
- Family: Oxudercidae
- Genus: Gillichthys
- Species: G. seta

Binomial name
- Gillichthys seta (Ginsburg, 1938)

Synonyms
- Lepidogobius seta Ginsburg, 1938

Species of ray-finned fish

Gillichthys seta, the shortjaw mudsucker, is a species of ray-finned fish. It is found in the Gulf of California.
