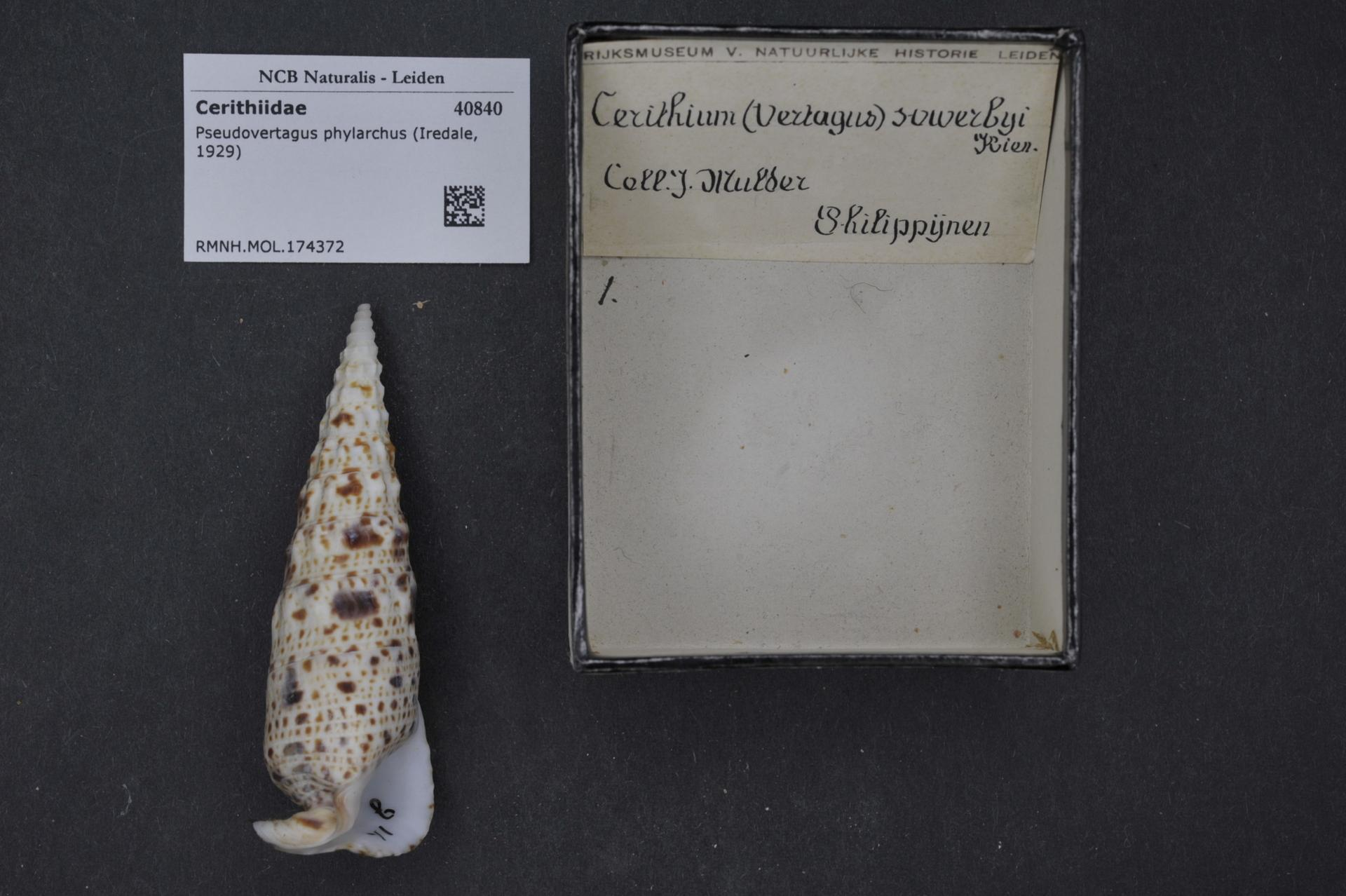

Scientific classification
- Kingdom: Animalia
- Phylum: Mollusca
- Class: Gastropoda
- Subclass: Caenogastropoda
- Order: incertae sedis
- Family: Cerithiidae
- Genus: Pseudovertagus
- Species: P. phylarchus

Binomial name
- Pseudovertagus phylarchus (Iredale, 1929)

Synonyms
- Cerithium (Vertagus) sowerbyi Kiener, 1841; Cerithium clava G.B. Sowerby I, 1834; Cerithium phylarchus Iredale, 1929; Cerithium sowerbyi Kiener, 1841; Pseudovertagus (Pseudovertagus) phylarchus (Iredale, 1929); Pseudovertagus excelsior Iredale, 1930

= Pseudovertagus phylarchus =

Species of gastropod

Pseudovertagus phylarchus is a species of sea snail, a marine gastropod mollusk in the family Cerithiidae.
