= Pseudovertagus nobilis =

Scientific classification
- Kingdom: Animalia
- Phylum: Mollusca
- Class: Gastropoda
- Subclass: Caenogastropoda
- Order: incertae sedis
- Family: Cerithiidae
- Genus: Pseudovertagus
- Species: P. nobilis

Binomial name
- Pseudovertagus nobilis (Reeve, 1855)

Synonyms
- Cerithiella (Cerithiella) tydemani Schepman, 1909; Cerithium (Vertagus) nobile Reeve, 1855; Cerithium nobile Reeve, 1855; Cerithium nobilis Reeve, 1855; Cerithium tydemani Schepman, 1909; Pseudovertagus (Pseudovertagus) nobilis (Reeve, 1855); Rhinoclavis nobilis (Reeve, 1855); Vertagus nobilis (Reeve, 1855)

Species of gastropod

Pseudovertagus nobilis is a species of sea snail, a marine gastropod mollusk in the family Cerithiidae, the ceriths.

== Distribution ==
This species occurs in the Indian Ocean off Madagascar.
