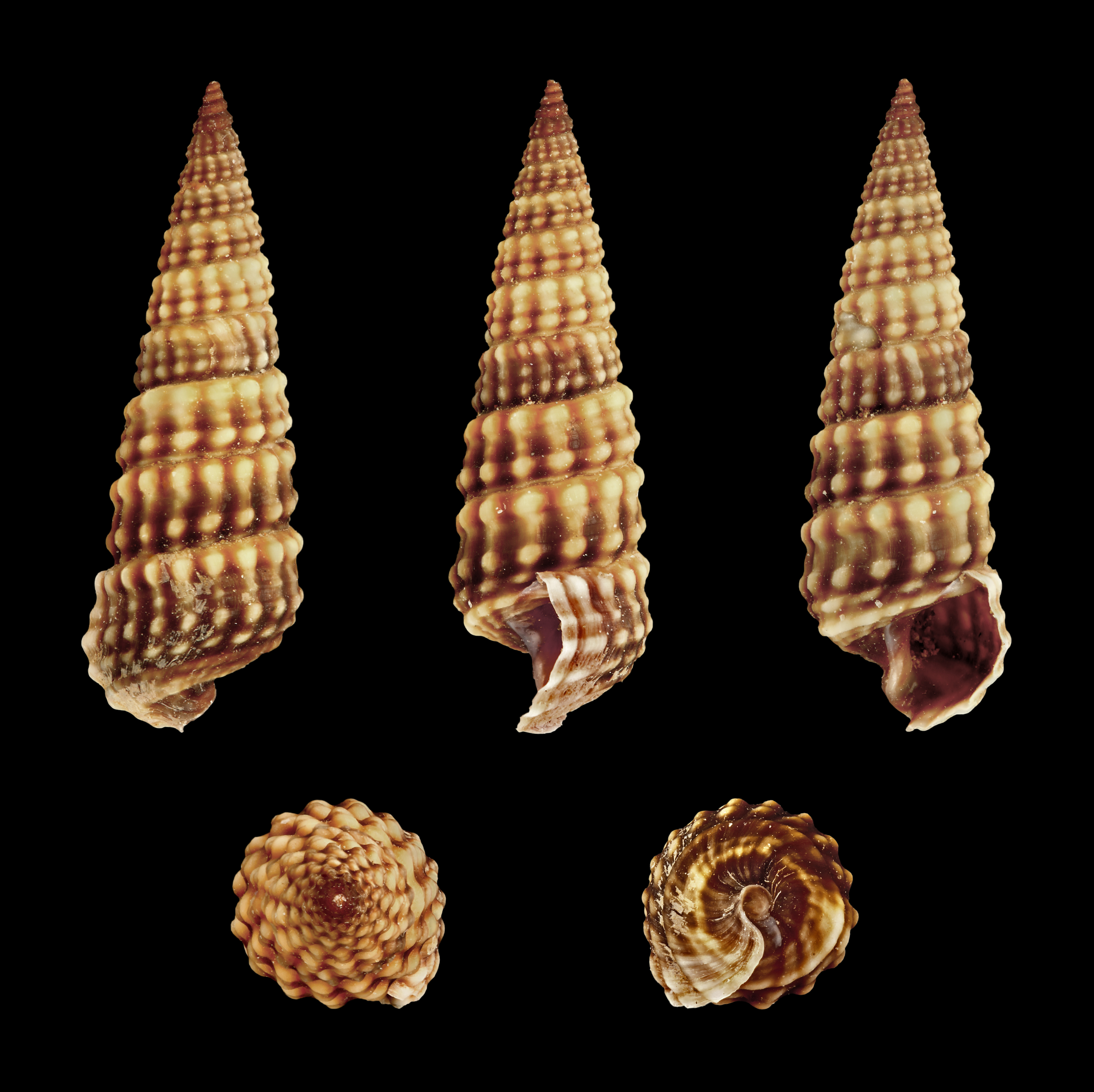
- A shell of Cerithideopsilla conica

Scientific classification
- Kingdom: Animalia
- Phylum: Mollusca
- Class: Gastropoda
- Subclass: Caenogastropoda
- Order: incertae sedis
- Family: Potamididae
- Genus: Pirenella
- Species: P. conica

Binomial name
- Pirenella conica (Blainville, 1829)

Synonyms
- Cerithium conicum Blainville, 1829; Potamides conicus (Blainville, 1829); Pirenella cailliaudi Potiez & Michaud, 1838; Pirenella conica (Blainville, 1829); Pirenella insculpta (Sowerby II, 1866); Pirenella layardii (A. Adams, 1854); Potamides cailliaudi Potiez & Michaud, 1838

= Pirenella conica =

Species of gastropod

Pirenella conica is a species of small sea snail, a marine gastropod mollusc in the family Potamididae.

== Taxonomy ==
Reid et al. (2008) moved Potamides conicus to the genus Cerithideopsilla based on the molecular phylogeny research. Other subsequent study also confirmed this placement within Cerithideopsilla. Other sources treat the species as Pirenella conica.

== Distribution ==
Distribution of Pirenella conica include Mediterranean and Indian Ocean.

This species occurs in or around:

- European waters
- Madagascar
- The Red Sea

== Description ==
The shell can attain a length of 14 mm and has a siphonal notch in the lower margin of the opening and the shell is thick.

== Ecology ==
The development of Pirenella conica is non-planktotrophic.

Parasites of Pirenella conica include:

- Pirenella conica serves as the first intermediate host of Heterophyes heterophyes.
