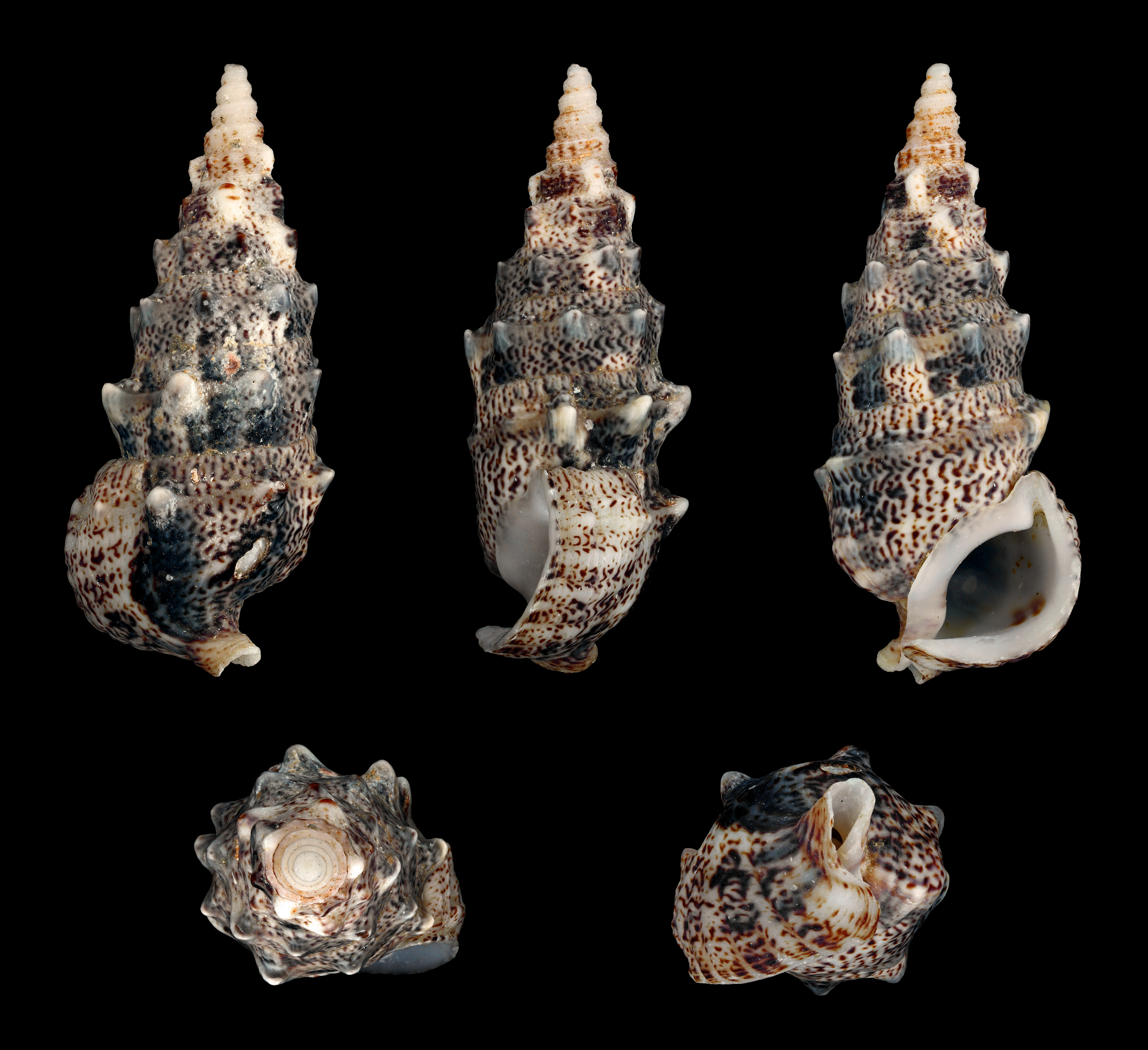
- Five views of a shell of Pseudovertagus aluco

Scientific classification
- Kingdom: Animalia
- Phylum: Mollusca
- Class: Gastropoda
- Subclass: Caenogastropoda
- Order: incertae sedis
- Family: Cerithiidae
- Genus: Pseudovertagus
- Species: P. aluco

Binomial name
- Pseudovertagus aluco (Linnaeus, 1758)

Synonyms
- Cerithium (Aluco) aluco (Linnaeus, 1758); Cerithium (Pseudovertagus) aluco (Linnaeus, 1758); Cerithium (Vertagus) aluco (Linnaeus, 1758); Cerithium aluco (Linnaeus, 1758); Cerithium cumingii A. Adams in G.B. Sowerby II, 1855; Murex aluco Linnaeus, 1758 (original combination); Murex coronatus Born, 1778; Pseudovertagus (Pseudovertagus) aluco (Linnaeus, 1758); Rhinoclavis aluco (Linnaeus, 1758); Strombus coronatus (Röding, 1798); Vertagus aluco (Linnaeus, 1758); Vertagus cumingii (A. Adams in G.B. Sowerby II, 1855)

= Pseudovertagus aluco =

Species of gastropod

Pseudovertagus aluco, common name aluco vertagus or Cuming's cerith, is a species of sea snail, a marine gastropod mollusk in the family Cerithiidae, the ceriths.

== Distribution ==
This species is present in the Indo-Pacific from the Eastern Africa to Philippines, and in Australia (Northern Territory, Queensland and Western Australia), the Samoan Islands and New Caledonia.

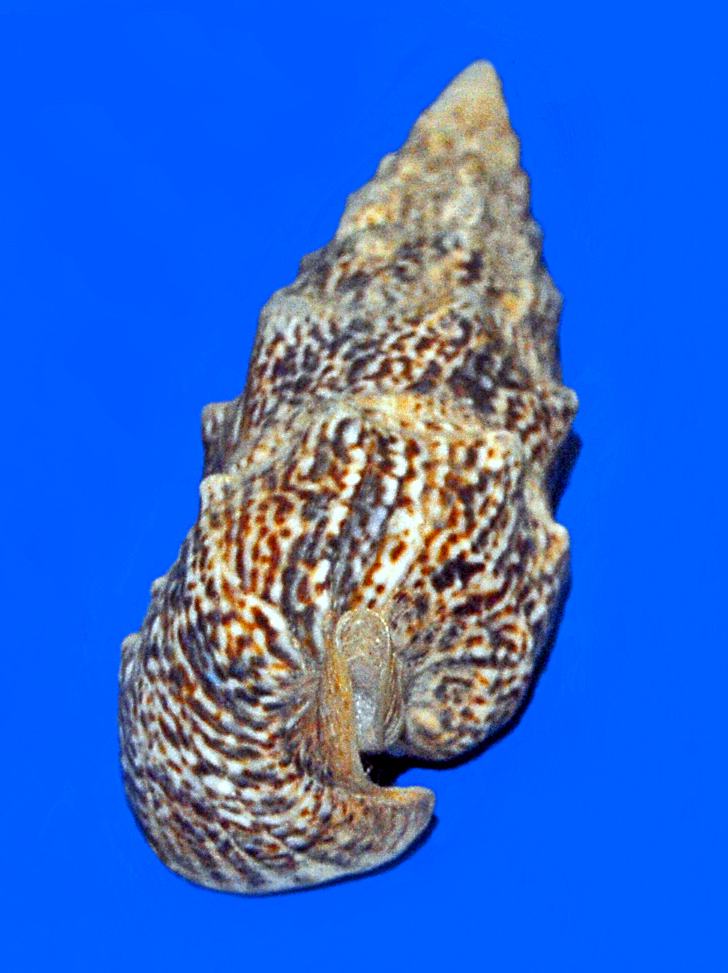
Shell of Pseudovertagus aluco from Australia

== Habitat ==
Pseudovertagus aluco can be found on sand-bars at the high tide level, on tidalflats, on clean sand and coralrubble.

== Description ==
Shell of Pseudovertagus aluco can reach a length of 45–95 millimetres (1.8–3.7 in). This species possess high-spired shells with a small aperture and a few spiral rows of tubercles.

== Behaviour ==
These sea snails usually extend their proboscis and foot deep into the sediments, rather than burrowing below the surface.

== Bibliography ==
- Dautzenberg, Ph. (1929). Contribution à l'étude de la faune de Madagascar: Mollusca marina testacea. Faune des colonies françaises, III(fasc. 4). Société d'Editions géographiques, maritimes et coloniales: Paris. 321–636, plates IV-VII pp.
- Petit R.E. (2009) George Brettingham Sowerby, I, II & III: their conchological publications and molluscan taxa. Zootaxa 2189: 1–218.
