= Pseudovertagus elegans =

Scientific classification
- Kingdom: Animalia
- Phylum: Mollusca
- Class: Gastropoda
- Subclass: Caenogastropoda
- Order: incertae sedis
- Family: Cerithiidae
- Genus: Pseudovertagus
- Species: P. elegans

Binomial name
- Pseudovertagus elegans Bozzetti, 2006

Species of gastropod

Pseudovertagus elegans is a species of sea snail, a marine gastropod mollusk in the family Cerithiidae.
