= Pseudovertagus peroni =

Scientific classification
- Kingdom: Animalia
- Phylum: Mollusca
- Class: Gastropoda
- Subclass: Caenogastropoda
- Order: incertae sedis
- Family: Cerithiidae
- Genus: Pseudovertagus
- Species: P. peroni

Binomial name
- Pseudovertagus peroni Wilson, 1975

Synonyms
- Pseudovertagus (Pseudovertagus) peroni Wilson, 1975

Species of gastropod

Pseudovertagus peroni is a species of sea snail, a marine gastropod mollusk in the family Cerithiidae.
