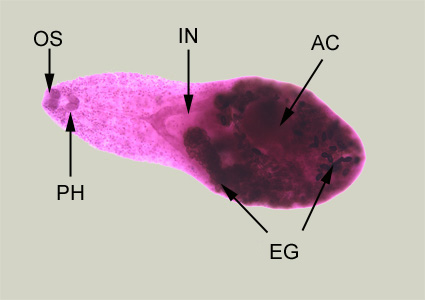
- Adult specimen of Heterophyes heterophyes stained with carmine

Scientific classification
- Domain: Eukaryota
- Kingdom: Animalia
- Phylum: Platyhelminthes
- Class: Trematoda
- Order: Plagiorchiida
- Family: Heterophyidae
- Genus: Heterophyes; Cobbold, 1866

= Heterophyes =

Genus of flukes

Heterophyes is a genus of trematodes, or fluke worms, in the family Heterophyidae.

== Species ==
Species within the genus Heterophyes include:

- Heterophyes aequalis Looss, 1902
- Heterophyes bucalis Marco del Pont, 1926
- Heterophyes dispar Looss, 1902
- Heterophyes fraterna (Looss, 1894)
- Heterophyes heroni El-Ezz, Tantawy, Mahdy & El-Massry, 2001
- Heterophyes heterophyes (Siebold, 1853)
- Heterophyes inops Looss, 1902
- Heterophyes larii Zhao, 1991
- Heterophyes nocens Onji & Nishio, 1916
