= Himasthlidae =

Scientific classification
- Kingdom: Animalia
- Phylum: Platyhelminthes
- Class: Trematoda
- Order: Plagiorchiida
- Suborder: Echinostomata
- Superfamily: Echinostomatoidea
- Family: Himasthlidae; Odhner, 1910

Family of flukes

Himasthlidae is a family of trematodes in the order Plagiorchiida.

== Genera ==
- Acanthoparyphium Dietz, 1909
- Aporchis Stossich, 1905
- Curtuteria Reimer, 1963
- Himasthla Dietz, 1909
