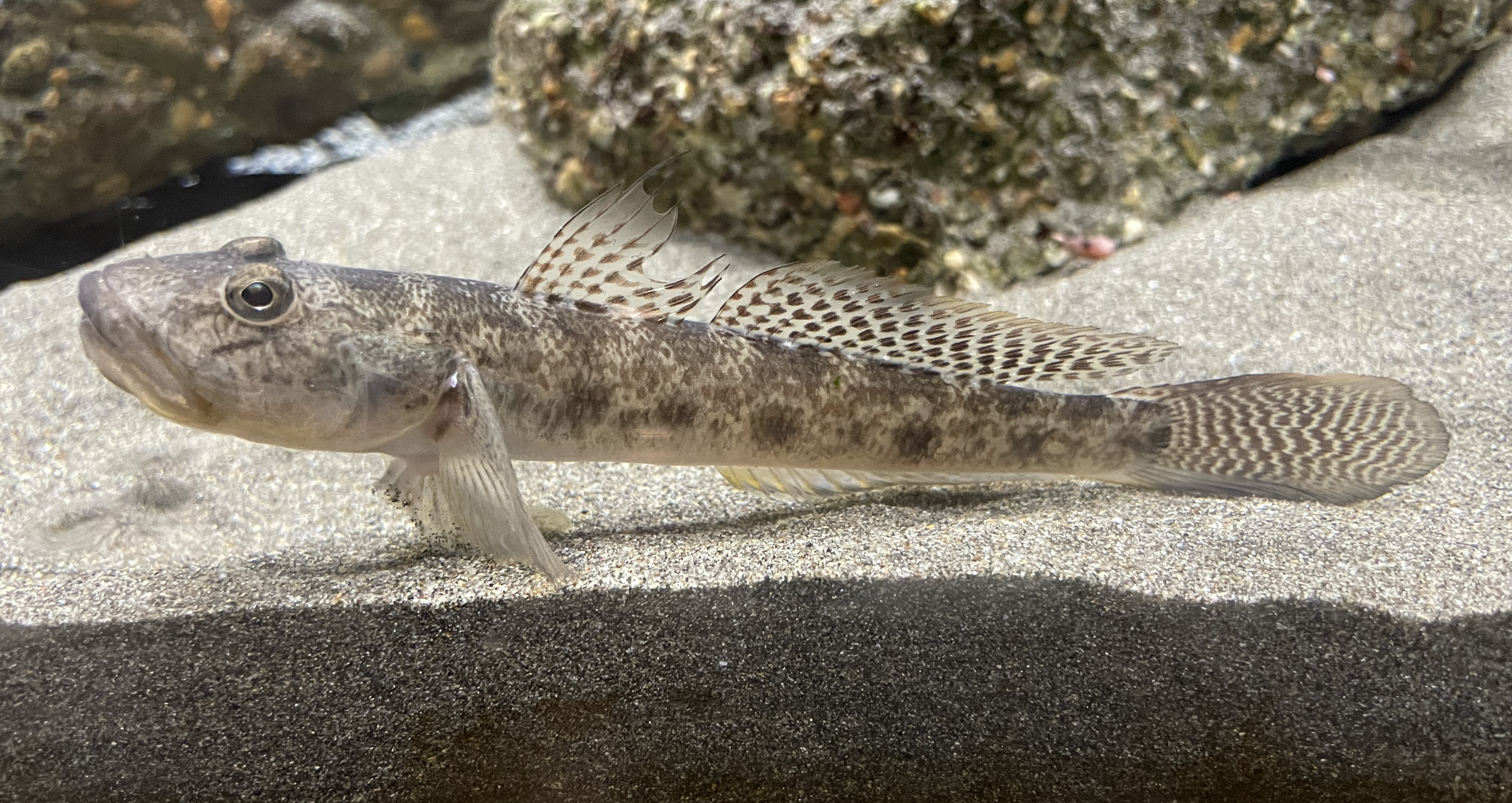

Conservation status
- Least Concern (IUCN 3.1)

Scientific classification
- Kingdom: Animalia
- Phylum: Chordata
- Class: Actinopterygii
- Order: Gobiiformes
- Family: Oxudercidae
- Genus: Acanthogobius
- Species: A. flavimanus

Binomial name
- Acanthogobius flavimanus (Temminck & Schlegel, 1845)

Synonyms
- Gobius flavimanus Temminck & Schlegel, 1845; Gobius stigmothonus J. Richardson, 1845; Aboma snyderi D. S. Jordan & Fowler, 1902; Acanthogobius jacoti Fowler, 1930; Gobius cryptosquamis Rendahl, 1924

= Acanthogobius flavimanus =

Species of fish

Acanthogobius flavimanus, commonly referred to as the yellowfin goby, mahaze, and Japanese river goby, is a goby native to the northwestern Pacific Ocean. It has spread beyond its native range to become an introduced, and often invasive, species. It has been recorded in Australia, Mexico, and Florida and California in the United States.

== Description ==
There are variable reports regarding the size of the yellowfin goby. One study, which collected fish near the Kiso River in Japan, found that the yellowfin goby's length ranges from 5-13 centimeters. A species profile conducted by the United States Geological Survey (USGS) describes the fish as being 30 cm long.

The yellowfin goby has a slender body which is primarily a pale brown color. There are darker brown spots and saddles along the body of the fish, as well as on the dorsal fin. Acanthogobius flavimanus, at all ages, possesses yellow ventral fins. Juveniles also have pale yellow ventral and anal fins (Gomon, 1994). The yellowfin goby has 8 or 9 spines on their first dorsal fin, and 12 to 14 segmented rays on their second fin.

The head is of moderate size, and the space between the eyes is narrow, and less than the diameter of a single eye. Acanthogobius flavimanus can be identified by the 24 to 30 transverse rows of scales along the top of its head. Another characteristic that can help identify this species is the arrangement of several pores on the head of the fish.

Acanthogobius flavimanus can be distinguished from Gillichthys mirabilis, the longjaw mudsucker, by the morphology of the mouth. The mouth of the longjaw mudsucker extends past the eyes, and almost reaches the gills. In the yellowfin goby, the mouth does not extend past the eye.

The yellowfin goby is considered to be a demersal fish, which means the adult fish lives and feeds near the bottom of the body of water it inhabits. Like most demersal fish, the larvae stage of Acanthogobius flavimanus, is considered to be pelagic. This means the larva lives in the open ocean away from the benthos or the shore. The juvenile stage of the yellowfin goby, however, lives near the bottom of the water it inhabits, and is considered benthic. The process where a demersal fish transitions from a pelagic larva to a benthic juvenile is called settlement.

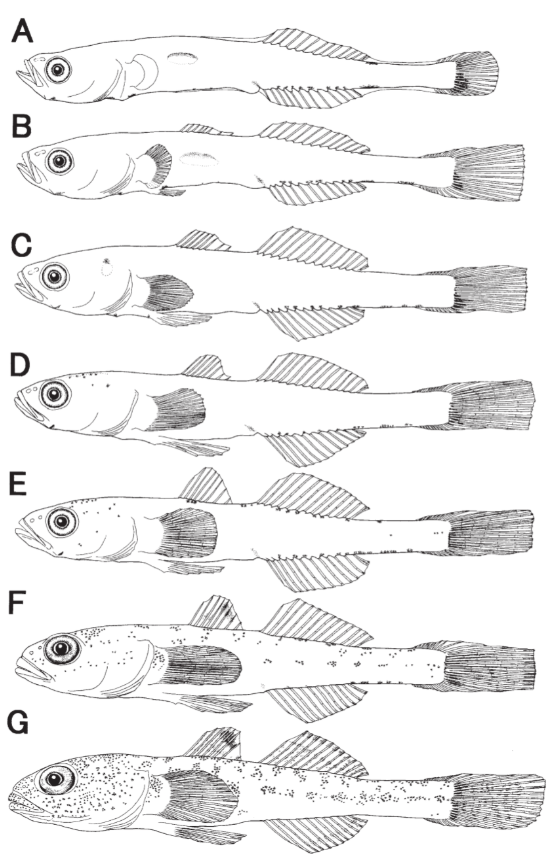
Drawing showcases seven distinct life stages of the yellowfin goby from larva to juvenile.

== Distribution ==
Acanthogobius flavimanus is native to northeastern Asia. The fish's native range includes the Bohai Sea, the Yellow Sea, Primorsky Krai, and the Japanese archipelago.

Generally, the yellowfin goby is a bottom dwelling fish, which inhabits bays and estuaries. Juvenile yellowfin gobies prefer tidal sloughs with peatmoss banks and muddy bottoms. Sometimes, outside of spawning seasons, Acanthogobius flavimanus will ascend rivers and streams. Adult fish in freshwater environments will migrate back towards the coast in order to spawn. The yellowfin goby is known to spawn or inhabit a variety of habitats including seawater, freshwater, polyhaline, mesohaline, and oligohaline waters.

The yellowfin goby has invaded the coasts of the United States and Australia, and is considered a pest in these places. It is hypothesized that this fish invades new waters through ballast water transport of larvae or eggs.

When the yellowfin goby was first introduced to the San Francisco Bay it had an explosive population growth, and became a common fish in estuaries. Since then, harbor seals in the San Francisco Bay have become known to prey on yellowfin gobies. In fact, a study conducted in 2015 found that the yellowfin goby was one of the most important species within the harbor seal diet. As the abundance of invasive species within San Francisco Bay has increased, so has the proportion of invasive species within the diets of harbor seals. Other than their effect on harbor seal diets, the impact of the yellowfin goby on fish native to the San Francisco and San Joaquin estuaries is not totally understood. Because the yellowfin goby does not typically spawn in waters where salinity is below 5 ppt, it is unlikely that the fish will persist in landlocked, freshwater environments within California.

The first yellowfin goby spotted off the coast of Australia, was collected in Sydney Harbour, in 1971. A total of 17 fish were collected between 1971 and 1973. However, the yellowfin goby has not experienced the same population growth off the coast of Australia, as it has on the west coast of the United States. A potential explanation for this is the warmer temperatures of this region.

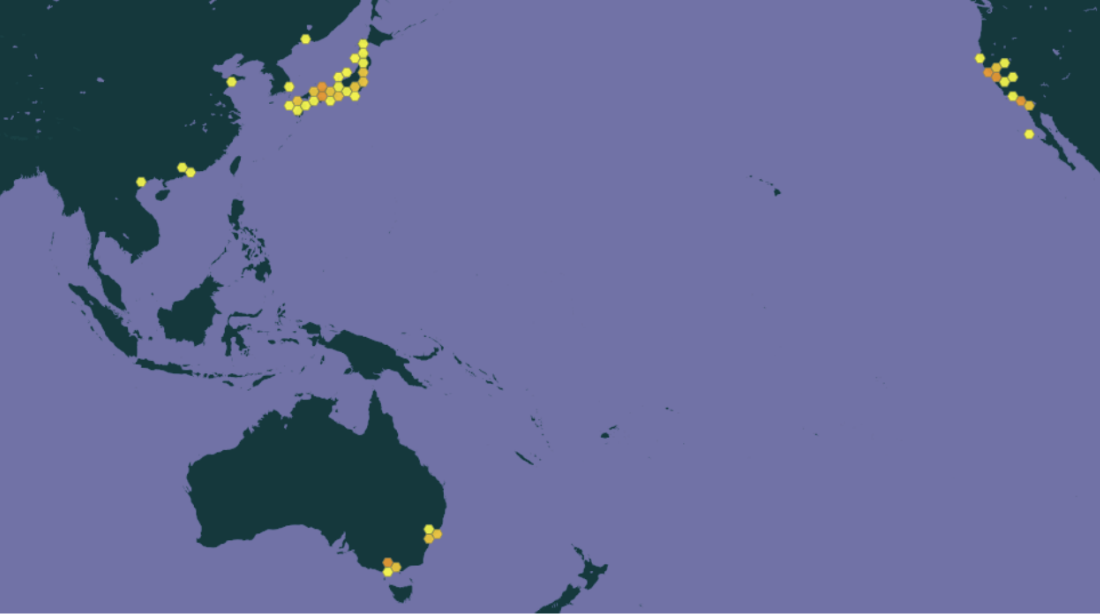
Map highlights current geographic range of Acanthogobius flavimanus

== Life history ==
The yellowfin goby typically reproduces in tidal mudflats, in both its native and introduced range. Spawning has been recorded at several locations off the coast of California, including the Tomales Bay, San Francisco Bay, San Pablo Bay, and Moss Landing Harbor. Substrates associated with the yellowfin goby's spawning range consist of mud, sand, and hollow bamboo segments.

Reproduction only occurs in waters where salinity exceeds 5ppt, freshwater populations are known to migrate downstream, towards more saline water in order to spawn. Spawning occurs between December and July. Y-shaped burrows are dug and guarded by the male fish, in intertidal mudflats. Before hatching, eggs incubate for 28 days. Mature eggs have a spherical shape, while fertilized eggs are teardrop or club-shaped. The diameter of the eggs is about 5mm across the long axis, and 1mm across the short axis. After the eggs have hatched, tidal streams help the planktonic larvae migrate towards tidal sloughs and estuaries. The larvae are typically 4–5 mm long when they hatch. The last fins to complete development are the fused pelvic fins. In yellowfin goby juveniles, the maxillary does not extend beyond the center of eyes. Yellowfin gobies are known to reach maturity in 2 or 3 years in California.

Generally, Acanthogobius flavimanus has a broad diet, and is considered to be a benthic omnivore. The yellowfin goby feeds on bivalves, chironomids, copepods, cumaceans, oligochaetes, tanaids, polychaetes, ostracods, arrow gobies, juvenile topsmelt, and more.

The yellowfin goby experiences an ontogenetic diet shift, meaning their diet changes during different stages of their development. Larval and juveniles tend to eat smaller prey, such as copepods. Harpacticoid copepods are a major food source, especially for juvenile gobies. Adults consume larger prey including small fishes and polychaetes.

One study conducted in the San Francisco Estuary found that 40% of the organisms the yellowfin goby preyed on were indigenous to that area.

== Conservation status ==
The yellowfin goby has been labeled as a least concern species by the IUCN. The yellowfin goby is considered common in coastal and estuarine waters surrounding Japan, and has even become a popular game fish. In its non-native range, Acanthogobius flavimanus, mainly along the west coast of the United States and the south east coast of Australia, the fish is well established. Along with other goby species in the San Francisco estuary, the yellowfin goby is used as baitfish.

Currently, there are no known diseases which pose a threat to the yellowfin goby. However, a multitude of parasitoids have been found inside of Acanthogobius flavimanus. The first was found living in the brain of the fish in 1952, it was named Myxobolus acanthogobii. Since then, more than a dozen parasites have been found living within the yellowfin goby.

== Other uses ==
This species is sometimes kept in aquaria as an ornamental fish.
