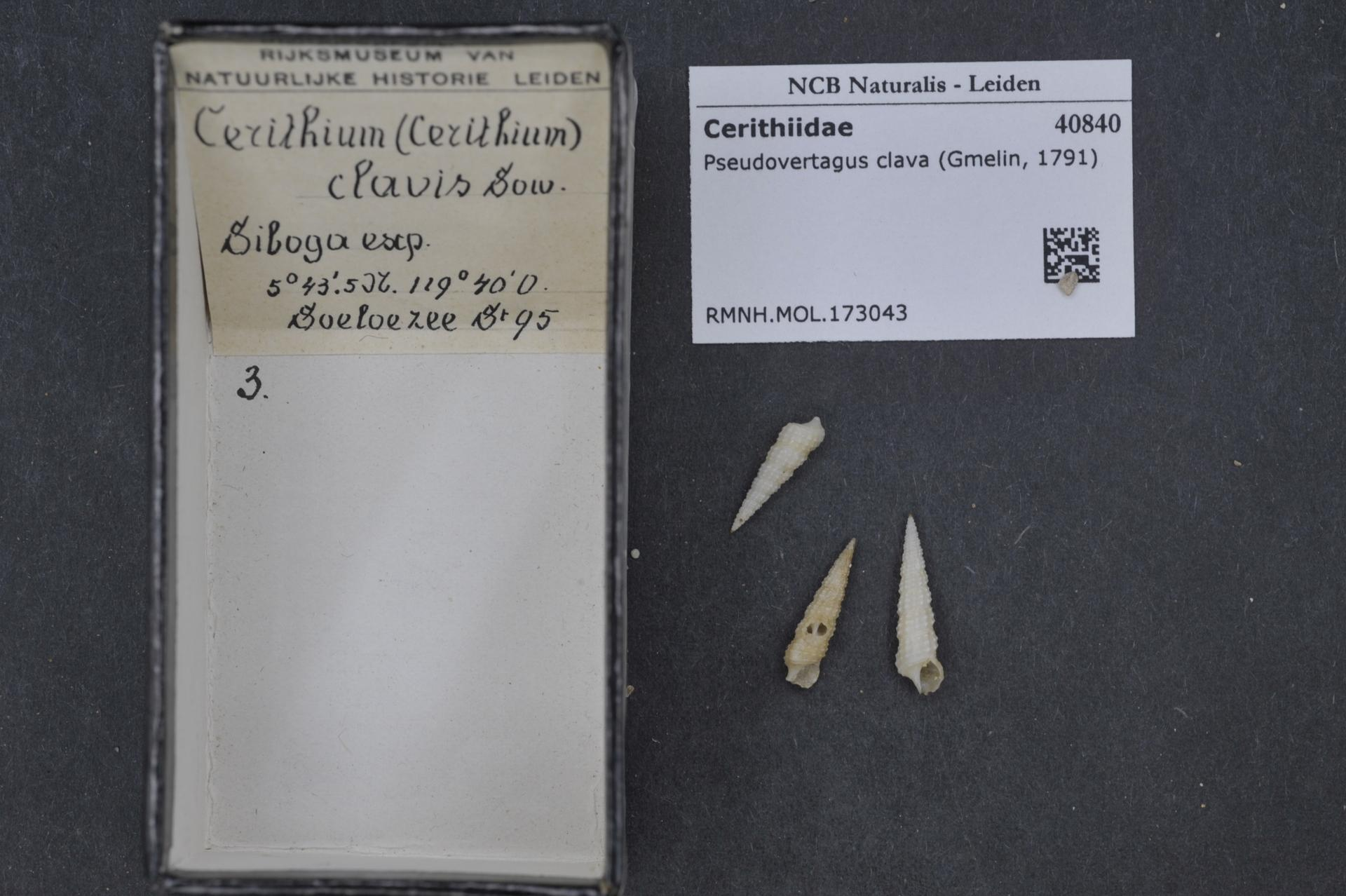

Scientific classification
- Kingdom: Animalia
- Phylum: Mollusca
- Class: Gastropoda
- Subclass: Caenogastropoda
- Order: incertae sedis
- Family: Cerithiidae
- Genus: Pseudovertagus
- Species: P. clava

Binomial name
- Pseudovertagus clava (Gmelin, 1791)

Synonyms
- Cerithium (Pseudovertagus) clava (Gmelin, 1791); Cerithium clava (Gmelin, 1791); Cerithium magnum Jay, 1836; Cerithium marmoratum Quoy & Gaimard, 1834; Murex clava Gmelin, 1791; Pirenella boswellae Barnard, 1963; Pseudovertagus (Pseudovertagus) clava (Gmelin, 1791)

= Pseudovertagus clava =

Species of gastropod

Pseudovertagus clava is a species of sea snail, a marine gastropod mollusk in the family Cerithiidae.
