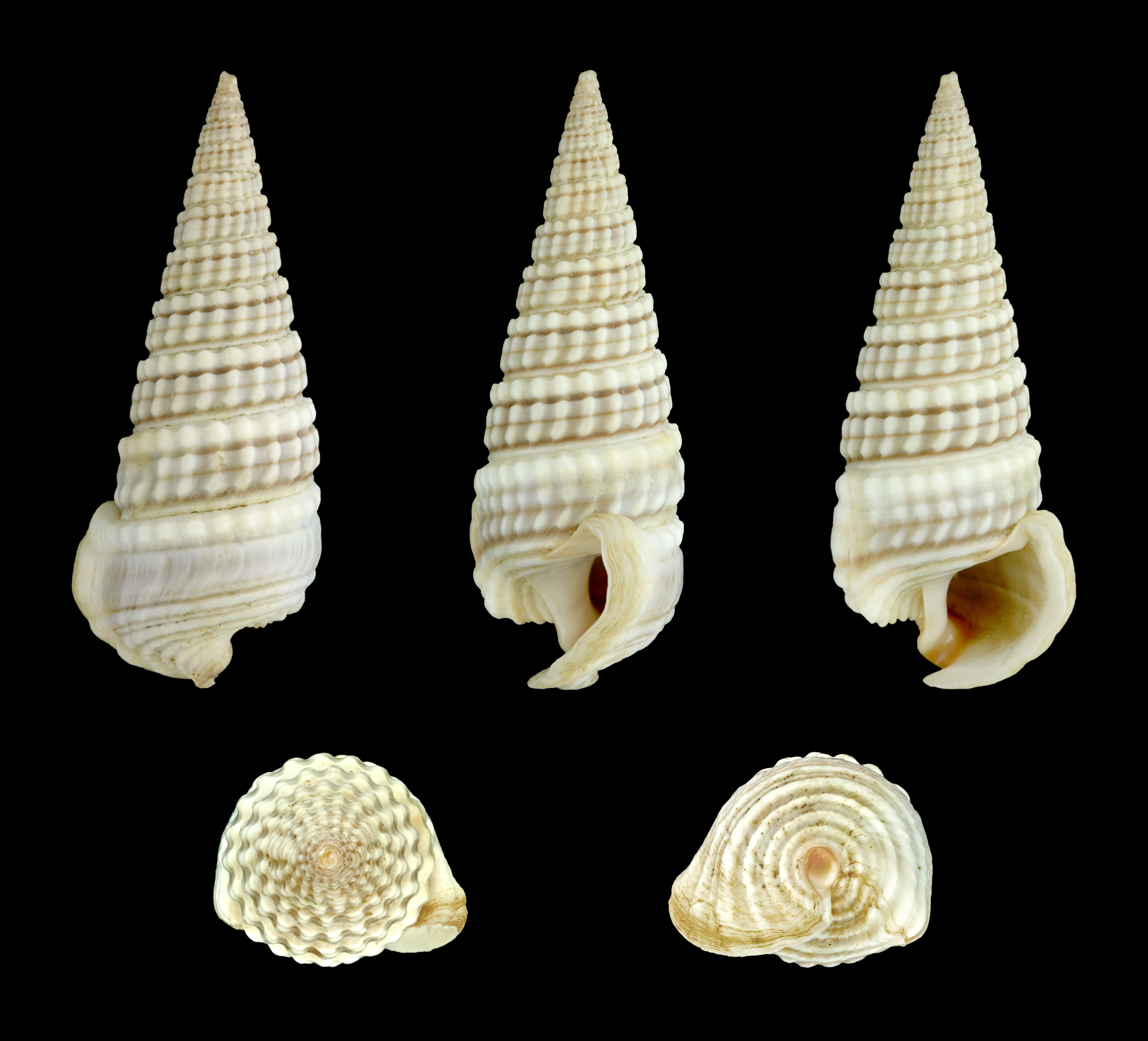
- shell of Pirenella cingulata

Scientific classification
- Kingdom: Animalia
- Phylum: Mollusca
- Class: Gastropoda
- Subclass: Caenogastropoda
- Order: incertae sedis
- Family: Potamididae
- Genus: Pirenella
- Species: P. cingulata

Binomial name
- Pirenella cingulata (Gmelin, 1791)

Synonyms
- Cerithidea cingulata (Gmelin, 1791); Cerithidea cingulata (Gmelin, 1791); Cerithidea fluviatilis (Potiez & Michaud, 1838); Cerithideopsilla cingulata (Gmelin, 1791); Cerithium fluviatile Potiez & Michaud, 1838; Murex cingulatus Gmelin, 1791 (original combination); Potamides cingulatus (Gmelin, 1791); Potamides fluviatilis (Potiez & Michaud, 1838); Strombus picta Röding, 1798 (objective synonym); Tympanotonos fluviatilis (Potiez & Michaud, 1838)

= Pirenella cingulata =

Species of gastropod

Pirenella cingulata is a species of medium-sized sea snails or mud snails, marine gastropod molluscs in the family Potamididae, the horn snails.

== Distribution ==
- Indo-Pacific coast.
- Hormozgan Province in Iran.

== Description ==
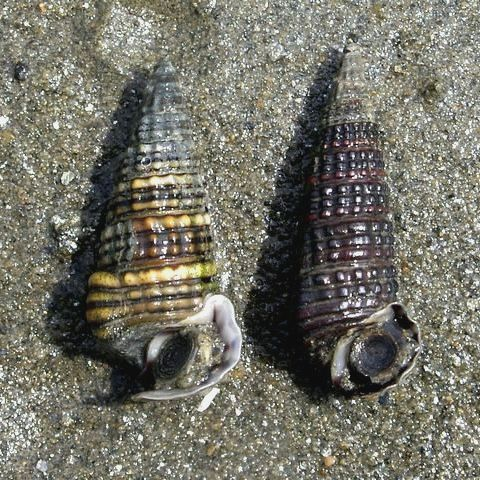
Comparison of live individual of Pirenella cingulata on the left, with Pirenella incisa on the right.

== Ecology ==
Parasites of Cerithideopsilla cingulata include:

- Heterophyidae: Cerithideopsilla cingulata serves as the first intermediate host of Heterophyes nocens.
- Echinostomatidae: Cerithideopsilla cingulata serves as the first intermediate host of Acanthoparyphium tyosenense.
