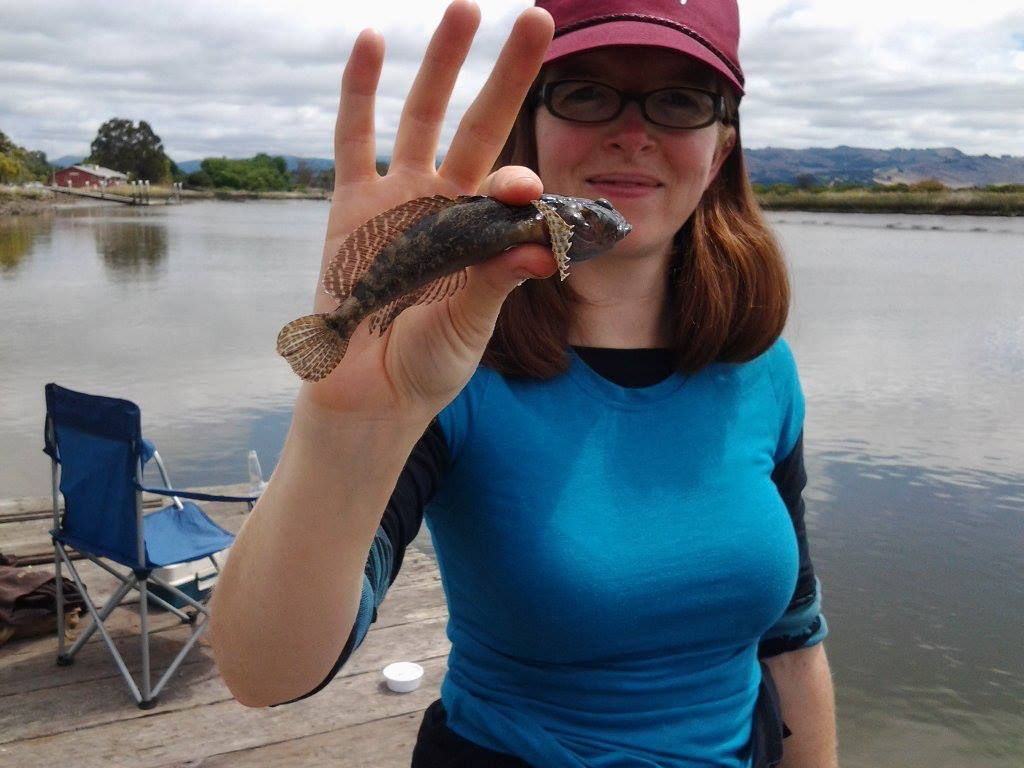
- from the Napa River, Napa, California, US

Conservation status
- Least Concern (IUCN 3.1)

Scientific classification
- Kingdom: Animalia
- Phylum: Chordata
- Class: Actinopterygii
- Division: Teleostei
- Order: Gobiiformes
- Family: Oxudercidae
- Genus: Gillichthys
- Species: G. mirabilis

Binomial name
- Gillichthys mirabilis J. G. Cooper, 1864

= Longjaw mudsucker =

Species of fish

The longjaw mudsucker (Gillichthys mirabilis) is a species of goby (family Gobiidae) found along the Pacific coast of California and Baja California. Known for its distinctive elongated jaws and robust body, this species can reach up to 21 centimetres (8 in) in length, making it one of the larger gobies in its habitat. Adapted to estuarine environments, the longjaw mudsucker has evolved to survive short periods out of water, utilizing tidal mudflats and sloughs as its primary habitat.

== Morphology ==
The morphology of the longjaw mudsucker is marked by an elongated body and distinctive long jaws, which contribute to its common name. Adults can reach a maximum length of approximately 150 mm (5.9 in) total length (TL), with most commonly observed at 135–140 mm (5.3–5.5 in) standard length (SL).

This species has a blunt head with small, widely spaced eyes situated closer to the sides in juveniles. Its terminal mouth is large, with the upper jaw extending nearly to the opercular opening in adults and reaching the rear margin of the eye in juveniles.

G. mirabilis also has two dorsal fins, a relatively heavy body, and a coloration that ranges from dark brown to olive on the back and sides, with a yellowish hue on the belly. Juveniles typically exhibit eight faint vertical bars along their sides and a dark blotch on the posterior side of the first dorsal fin.

The first dorsal fin consists of 4–8 spines, while the second dorsal fin contains 10–17 rays. The anal fin has 9–17 rays, and the pectoral fins, which are broad and rounded, contain 15–23 rays. The pelvic fins are united, forming a suction cup, a common feature in gobies, which aids in attachment to surfaces. The lateral line comprises 60–100 small scales, which are absent on the front of the belly but become more prominent toward the caudal peduncle.

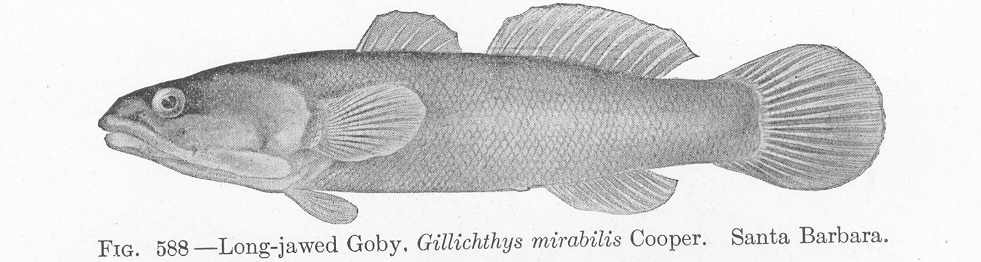
Illustration of Gillichthys mirabilis (Long-jawed Goby) from Santa Barbara, highlighting the elongated body and distinctive fin structure.

== Jaw anatomy ==
As the common name suggests, the upper jaw of Gillichthys mirabilis is exceptionally long, with the maxilla reaching nearly the opercular opening in fully grown adults. This jaw structure likely provides a functional advantage by increasing the surface area of the buccopharyngeal membrane, enhancing gas exchange when the fish is out of the water. This adaptation allows the species to thrive in low-oxygen environments.

The extended jaws also contribute to the species' aggressive gaping behavior, making territorial displays more prominent during social interactions.

== Age and sexual development ==
Gillichthys mirabilis (longjaw mudsucker) exhibits a rapid growth rate, particularly during the summer months, and can reach sexual maturity at a length of 60–80 m (200–260 ft) within several months. The species has a relatively short lifespan, living approximately two years.

Sexual development involves males creating and defending breeding burrows, which are essential for successful reproduction. Females produce between 8,000 and 27,000 eggs and spawn multiple times during the breeding season, which occurs from January to July in southern populations and from December to June in northern populations, such as those in San Francisco Bay. Fertilized eggs are attached to the walls of burrows, where males guard the nests for 10–12 days until the embryos hatch.

Newly hatched larvae are pelagic, remaining in the water column before settling to the bottom as juveniles, at which point they are 8–12 mm in length. After reaching this juvenile stage, they begin to establish themselves within the estuarine environment.

This species thrives across a wide salinity range, from 12 to 82.5 ppt, and can tolerate temperatures up to 35°C. Their reproductive strategy and rapid growth enable longjaw mudsuckers to maintain stable populations in dynamic environments such as shallow sloughs, tidal mudflats, and estuaries.

== Habitat and feeding behavior ==
Longjaw mudsuckers inhabit estuaries, particularly tidal sloughs with shallow, mud-covered bottoms, where they often excavate burrows. When the tide recedes and the mud is exposed, they retreat to their burrows or move into tidal channels. If trapped on the mud, they can gulp air using the buccopharyngeal chamber in their throat, allowing them to survive until the next tide.

Their diet includes a wide range of prey they find in the mud, primarily invertebrates, though they may also consume small fish such as the California killifish. Their feeding choices largely depend on seasonal availability, adapting to the resources present within their habitat.

== Geological distribution ==
The native range of the longjaw mudsucker (Gillichthys mirabilis) extends from Tomales Bay in northern California to Bahía Magdalena in Baja California Sur. A disjunct population exists in the northern Gulf of California, having evolved independently from the populations in California and western Baja for approximately 284,000 years.

This species has also been reported outside its native range in locations such as Roosevelt Lake on the Salt River in Arizona, and the Salton Sea in California. It was likely introduced into the lower Colorado River in the Arizona-California-Nevada region, where it is commonly used as a bait minnow.

Map showing the native range of Gillichthys mirabilis along the coasts of California and Baja California

== Comparison with yellowfin goby ==
The yellowfin goby (Acanthogobius flavimanus) is another goby species found in California and is often confused with the longjaw mudsucker due to similarities in habitat and diet. However, they differ significantly in several morphological and ecological aspects. Unlike the longjaw mudsucker, which primarily inhabits estuarine environments, the yellowfin goby can be found in fresh, brackish, and marine waters.

Yellowfin gobies are notably larger than longjaw mudsuckers, reaching lengths of 25–30 centimetres (9.8–11.8 in), compared to the mudsucker's maximum length of around 21 centimetres (8.3 in). Yellowfin gobies have a light brown body with darker saddle-marks and spots, in contrast to the more uniform olive-brown coloration of the longjaw mudsucker. Additionally, yellowfin gobies are distinguished by the arrangement of pores, spines, and rays on their dorsal fins, as well as specific patterns of scales and papillae on the head and face. Unlike the longjaw mudsucker, which has an elongated jaw that extends beyond the eyes, the yellowfin goby has a shorter mouth that does not extend beyond the eyes. The yellow ventral fins of yellowfin gobies serve as a unique identifier, further distinguishing them from other gobies in the region.

The yellowfin goby was introduced to California in the 1960s, primarily in the San Francisco Bay-Delta area, likely due to various practices, including its use as baitfish, similar to the longjaw mudsucker. In terms of diet, both species share a similar benthic feeding habit, preying on smaller organisms within the sediment, although their diets may vary based on habitat differences.

Reproductively, male yellowfin gobies reach maturity within a year, while females mature in two years at a length of 190–233 mm (7.5–9.2 in). In contrast, longjaw mudsuckers reach sexual maturity faster, often within several months, and at a smaller size of around 60–80 mm (2.4–3.1 in).

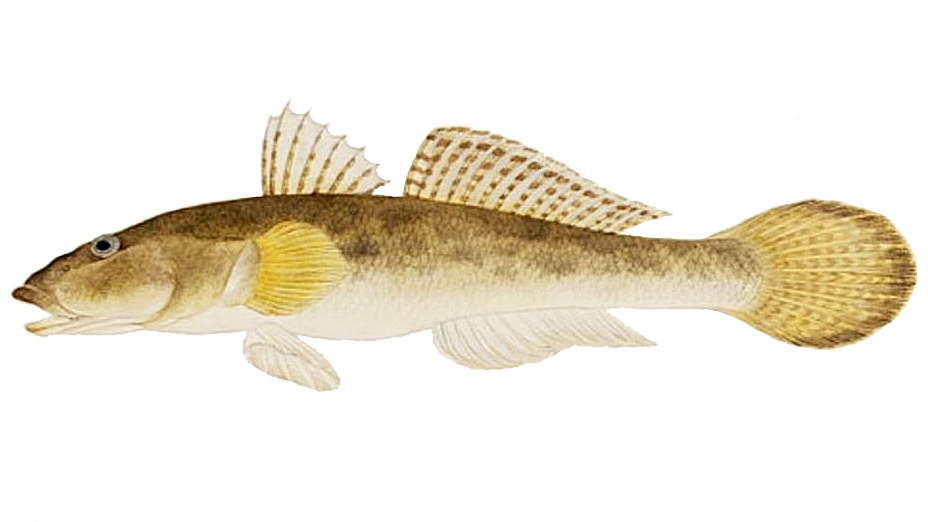
Illustration of Acanthogobius flavimanus by Kawahara Keiga, from the Siebold Collection (1823–1829).

== Conservation and threats ==
The longjaw mudsucker (Gillichthys mirabilis) is currently listed as "Least Concern" by the International Union for Conservation of Nature (IUCN), indicating that the species is not at immediate risk of extinction.

Research into potential risks in estuarine environments found that longjaw mudsuckers exhibit the lowest levels of mercury bioaccumulation among fish species in the San Francisco Bay Estuary, suggesting lower immediate toxicological risks for this species.

Additional studies have examined the effects of sea level changes on the species' habitat and genetic diversity. Variations in sea levels, primarily driven by glacial cycles, have altered the availability of estuarine habitats, leading to periods of population isolation and recolonization. These fluctuations pose potential long-term threats by affecting habitat availability and the genetic diversity of longjaw mudsucker populations.
