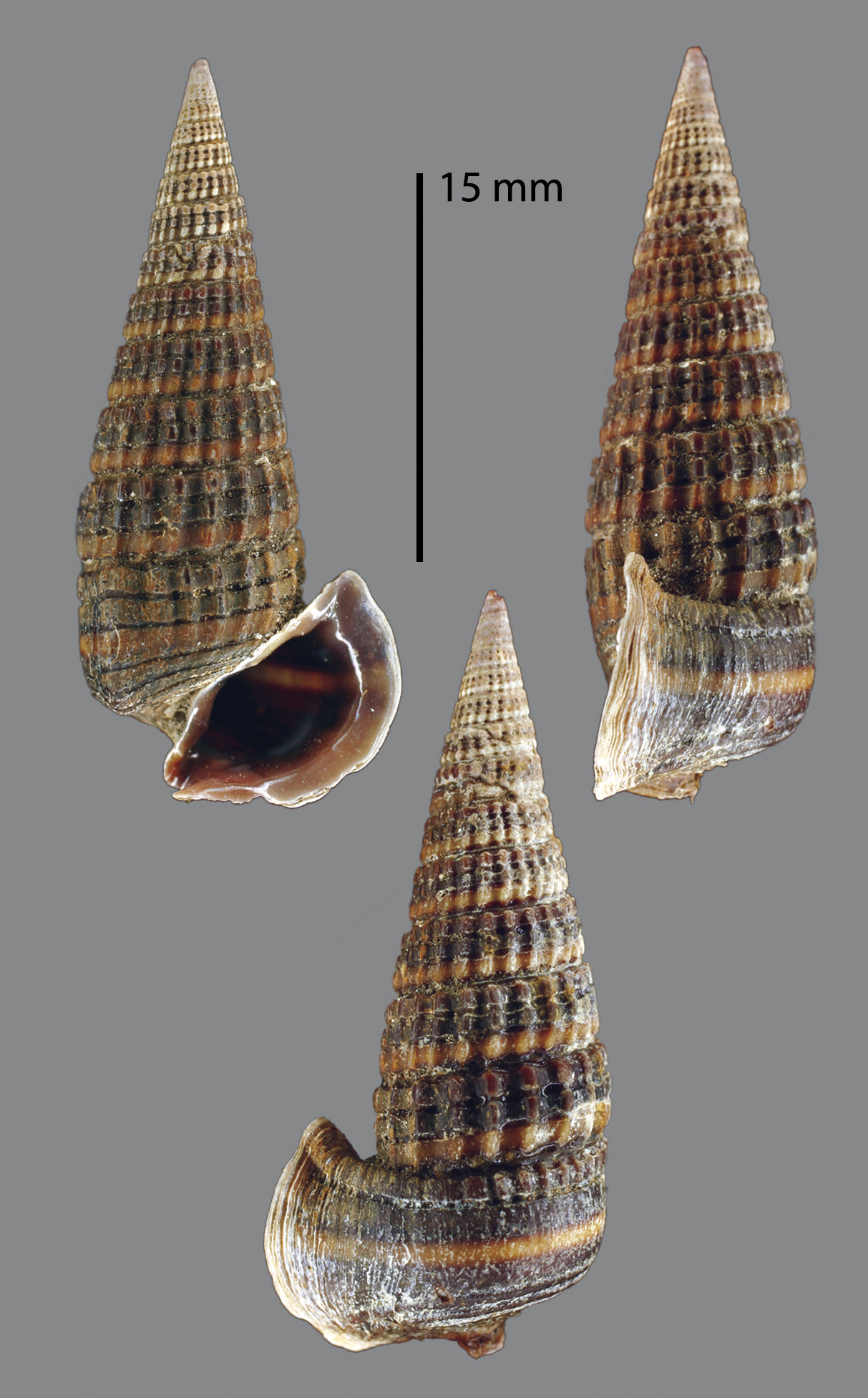
- Shell of Pirenella microptera (specimen at MNHN, Paris)

Scientific classification
- Kingdom: Animalia
- Phylum: Mollusca
- Class: Gastropoda
- Subclass: Caenogastropoda
- Order: incertae sedis
- Family: Potamididae
- Genus: Pirenella
- Species: P. microptera

Binomial name
- Pirenella microptera (Kiener, 1841)

Synonyms
- Cerithidea microptera (Kiener, 1842); Cerithideopsilla microptera (Kiener, 1842); Cerithium microptera Kiener, 1842 (original combination); Tympanotonos microptera (Kiener, 1841); Typhanotus microptera (Kiener, 1841)

= Pirenella microptera =

Species of gastropod

Pirenella microptera is a species of snail, a brackish-water gastropod mollusk in the family Potamididae.

== Distribution ==
This species occurs in the Indo-West Pacific.

== Description ==
The length of the shell varies between 10 mm and 40 mm.

== Ecology ==
Pirenella microptera is a predominantly mangrove-associated species.
