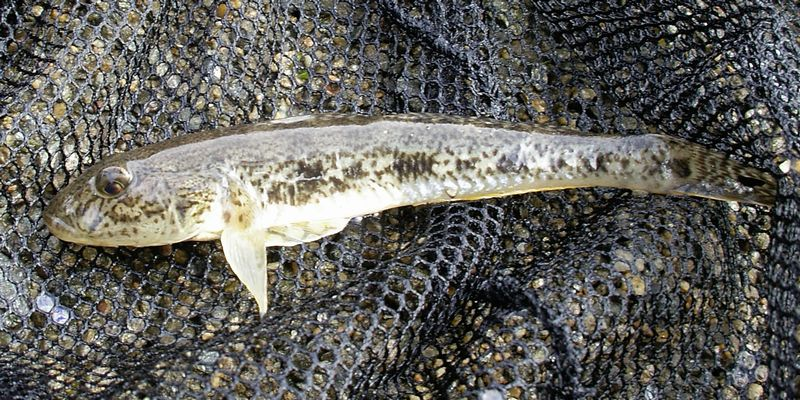
- Yellowfin Goby (A. flavimanus)

Scientific classification
- Kingdom: Animalia
- Phylum: Chordata
- Class: Actinopterygii
- Division: Teleostei
- Order: Gobiiformes
- Family: Oxudercidae
- Subfamily: Gobionellinae
- Genus: Acanthogobius; T. N. Gill, 1859

Type species
- Gobius flavimanus Temminck & Schlegel, 1845

Synonyms
- Diepinotus Rafinesque, 1814; Synechogobius Gill, 1859; Actinogobius Bleeker, 1874

= Acanthogobius =

Genus of fishes

Acanthogobius is a genus of gobies native to marine, fresh and brackish waters of eastern Asia.

== Species ==
There are currently eight recognized species in this genus:

- Acanthogobius donghaiensis (Prokofiev, 2012)
- Acanthogobius elongatus (Fang, 1942)
- Acanthogobius flavimanus (Temminck & Schlegel, 1845) (Yellowfin goby)
- Acanthogobius hasta (Temminck & Schlegel, 1845)
- Acanthogobius insularis (Shibukawa & Taki, 1996)
- Acanthogobius lactipes (Hilgendorf, 1879)
- Acanthogobius luridus (Y. Ni & H. L. Wu, 1985)
- Acanthogobius stigmothonus (Richardson, 1845)

=== Summary ===
Body relatively large, head moderately long, triangular in cross-section, eyes close together near top of head; mouth terminal, oblique, reaching almost to below middle of eye.

A brownish goby with darker mottling on the back and cheek, and a thin dark diagonal line from eye to rear margin of jaws. Midsides with 6-8 irregular darker blotches, and a dark round spot at the base of the tail. Upper part of pectoral-fin base with a short horizontal dark bar. Dorsal and caudal fin with fine speckled lines, pectoral fins yellow.

Accidentally introduced to Australia and California when juveniles or larvae were transported in ship's ballast water which was released in ports of call.
